= Lady Luck Gaming =

American casino operator

Lady Luck Gaming Corp.
- Industry: Gaming
- Founded: 1991; 35 years ago
- Founder: Andrew Tompkins
- Defunct: 2000
- Headquarters: Las Vegas, Nevada,

Lady Luck Gaming Corp. was a gaming company based in Las Vegas, Nevada, that developed and operated casinos in the Midwestern and Southern United States. It was acquired by Isle of Capri Casinos in 2000.

== History ==
=== Company founding and first casinos (1991-1993) ===
In 1991, Andrew Tompkins, founder of the Lady Luck Hotel & Casino in downtown Las Vegas, wanted to expand locally, but found property in Las Vegas and Laughlin too expensive. Instead, he joined many other gaming industry figures in looking to Midwestern and Southern states that were beginning to legalize riverboat casinos. He revealed plans for a casino in Natchez, Mississippi, in August 1991, and went on to open the Lady Luck Natchez in February 1993 at a cost of $8 million.

After Colorado legalized gambling in three cities in 1991, Tompkins negotiated to buy land for a casino in Central City from the school district, but withdrew from the deal after the city council imposed a 9-month moratorium on new casino development. Instead, Tompkins and the Lady Luck signed on to consult for the financially troubled Gold Coin Saloon and Casino in Central City, which turned into an agreement in March 1993 for Tompkins to buy the property.

Under the terms of Tompkins's deal with the Gold Coin's owners, American Casino Group Inc. was formed in February 1993 to hold the Lady Luck gaming ventures, except for the Las Vegas property. The company's name was changed to Lady Luck Gaming in July.

=== Rapid expansion (1993-94) ===
Lady Luck embarked on a strategy of moving into new gaming jurisdictions quickly with modest investments, planning to open riverboat casinos with no hotels or other extensive land-based facilities.

In May 1993, the company entered into an agreement with developer Charles Lambert, taking a 68 percent stake in a joint venture to build the Lady Luck of Baton Rouge. The proposal faced a tough licensing battle, as the Louisiana Riverboat Gaming Commission had allotted only two casino licenses for the Baton Rouge area, and had already given preliminary approval to two applicants. Lambert and Tompkins planned to renovate the historic Capitol House Hotel, which they bought in November for $2 million, for use as a terminal for a casino boat. After failing in legal maneuvers to dislodge one of the two licenses, though, Lady Luck sold out its share of the project to Lambert in September 1994.

By June 1993, three more casinos were in the licensing process in Mississippi, in Tunica, Gulfport, and Biloxi. The Lady Luck Tunica in Mhoon Landing opened September 18, at a cost of $29 million, and the Lady Luck Biloxi opened in December.

Lady Luck Gaming planned its initial public offering for August 1993, but postponed it because of the effect the Great Mississippi and Missouri Rivers Flood could have on riverboat gaming stocks. The offering was completed the next month.

The company in August 1993 proposed a $56-million hotel and casino in Jefferson County, Missouri, just outside Kimmswick. The project stalled as the Missouri Gaming Commission adopted a "wait-and-see" approach to distributing the state's limited set of gaming licenses. The license was finally approved in 2000, after Isle of Capri had acquired Lady Luck, but the company abandoned the project a year later in the face of local opposition and potential lawsuits.

In February 1994, Lady Luck, already heavily in debt, raised $185 million by issuing mortgage notes, stating that it could not afford to wait for existing properties to provide the funding for projects in new markets.

The same month, Lady Luck proposed a $210-million hotel and riverboat casino in Lawrenceburg, Indiana, in a bid for the single gaming license allocated to Dearborn County. The city council backed three other bids in June, demurring to Lady Luck's proposal because it was located outside of city limits, and the state ultimately awarded the license to a group led by Argosy Gaming.

Two more Missouri casinos were proposed in 1994, for Cape Girardeau and St. Charles County, but the Cape Girardeau City Council in March gave its backing to a competing plan by Boyd Gaming, and the St. Charles County Council dropped Lady Luck from consideration in May, ultimately backing a proposal by Jumer's. Within weeks of the Cape Girardeau rejection, Lady Luck moved on to nearby Scott City, proposing a $63-million hotel-casino. The plan won the endorsement of the city council, but was stalled by the Gaming Commission's deliberative pace. No licensing decision had been made by the time of the company's acquisition.

=== Plans reined in (1994-1998) ===
The Tunica casino closed after less than a year due to declining attendance, and the barge was relocated to Coahoma County, where it opened in June 1994 as the Lady Luck Rhythm & Blues. An entertainment pavilion and a second barge, the Country Casino, were opened at the site in May 1996. An accompanying 120-room hotel across the bridge in Helena, Arkansas was acquired two months later, and the 314-room Country Hotel opened on-site in 1999.

Another casino, the Lady Luck Olympia, was planned for Robinsonville (now Tunica Resorts), closer to Memphis. The site's hotel opened in August 1994, but with Lady Luck running short on money, the casino, along with another property planned for Vicksburg, were put on hold, until a joint venture agreement was reached with Bally Entertainment. Bally moved its casino barge from Mhoon Landing to the Robinsonville site and opened it as Bally's Saloon in December 1995, with Lady Luck owning a 35 percent stake in the complex.

In July 1994, Lady Luck announced an agreement for a joint venture to open a casino and outlet mall in Bettendorf, Iowa, in the Quad Cities, with Bettendorf Riverfront Development Co., a company owned by the family of Isle of Capri founder Bernard Goldstein. Lady Luck Bettendorf opened the following April. A hotel was added in August 1998.

In August 1994, the company announced bids for two of ten gaming licenses available in Greece, one in conjunction with the city of Loutraki, and the other in Patras, in partnership with a local hotel. Both projects were abandoned by the end of the year. Agreements were also announced for Lady Luck to develop three tribal casinos, with the Santa Ana Pueblo near Albuquerque, the Chemehuevi Indian Tribe at Lake Havasu, and the Coquitlam Band near Vancouver, but the Santa Ana tribe withdrew from its agreement because of Lady Luck's weak financial condition, and the two other partnerships were never realized either.

Also in August 1994, the company partnered with Edward Carroll, Jr., owner of Riverside Park in Agawam, Massachusetts, in a proposal to build a hotel and dockside casino complex at the theme park, one of several competing casino proposals in the state. The plan died after Agawam voters rejected a non-binding referendum in support of casino gambling in November.

Plans for Lady Luck Gulfport were suspended in October 1994 due to saturation of the Gulf Coast casino market and a lawsuit by the neighboring Gulfport Yacht Club.

In 1997, Lady Luck sold its share of Bally's Saloon to Hilton Hotels, which had bought Bally Entertainment the year before, for $15 million cash. Another agreement that year put Lady Luck in a joint venture with Horseshoe Gaming to develop the site in Vicksburg, but the project never came to fruition. The Lady Luck Biloxi, losing money and lacking space to expand, was sold the following year to Grand Casinos, owner of the neighboring Grand Casino Biloxi, for $15 million and closed. The Lady Luck Central City, also losing money, was sold in 1998 as well, to its mortgage holder, J.D. Carelli, for $2.75 million in forgiven debt.

=== Acquisitions and merger with Isle of Capri (1999-2000) ===
In August 1999, the company agreed to buy the Miss Marquette riverboat in Marquette, Iowa from Sodak Gaming for $42 million, and separately, the Lady Luck trademark and the Las Vegas property from Tompkins for $45.5 million. The company's financial advisers expressed doubt, though, that funding could be secured at an acceptable cost.

Within weeks of the announcement of the deal with Tompkins, Isle of Capri Casinos made an unsolicited offer to buy Lady Luck Gaming, attracted by the fact that it would now control its name and would no longer make royalty payments to Tompkins. An agreement was reached in October, at a total value over $400 million. With the help of a $16 million loan from Isle of Capri, Lady Luck completed the acquisition of the Miss Marquette in November. The merger was completed in March 2000, with Isle of Capri paying $59 million for Lady Luck's common stock, $22 million to redeem preferred stock, and $177 million in assumed debt. On the same day, Isle of Capri closed on purchases of the other half of the Bettendorf property from Goldstein's family for $62 million, and the Lady Luck trademark from Tompkins for $31 million. Six months later, it completed the purchase of the Lady Luck in Las Vegas for $14.5 million. All of the casinos were rebranded under the Isle of Capri name, except the Lady Luck Las Vegas, which was sold in 2002 to a group of real estate investors.

In 2009, the company revived its Lady Luck brand name for smaller properties with limited amenities, while keeping the Isle of Capri brand for its full-service properties (typically with hotel rooms, convention facilities, and expanded dining options).

== Properties ==
Casinos owned at some point, in whole or in part, by Lady Luck Gaming:

Name	Location	Notes
Bally's Saloon	Tunica Resorts, Mississippi	Opened December 1995; 35% ownership, sold November 1997
Lady Luck Bettendorf	Bettendorf, Iowa	Opened April 1995; 50% ownership
Lady Luck Biloxi	Biloxi, Mississippi	Opened December 1993; sold and closed June 1998
Lady Luck Central City	Central City, Colorado	Bought May 1993; sold February 1998
Lady Luck Natchez	Natchez, Mississippi	Opened February 1993
Lady Luck Rhythm & Blues	Lula, Mississippi	Opened June 1994
Lady Luck Tunica	Mhoon Landing, Mississippi	Opened September 1993; closed April 1994; boat moved to Lula
Miss Marquette Casino	Marquette, Iowa	Bought November 1999
