= Isle of Capri Casinos =

Former American casino operator

Isle of Capri Casinos, Inc.
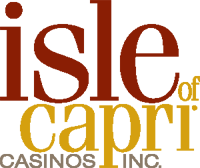
- Formerly: Kana Corporation (1990–1992); Anubis II Corporation (1992); Casino America, Inc. (1992–1998)
- Type: Public
- Traded as: Nasdaq: ISLE
- Industry: Gaming
- Genre: Casinos
- Founded: 1990; 36 years ago
- Founder: Bernard Goldstein
- Defunct: May 1, 2017; 9 years ago
- Fate: Acquired by Eldorado Resorts
- Headquarters: Creve Coeur, Missouri, U.S.

Isle of Capri Casinos, Inc. was a gaming company headquartered in Creve Coeur, Missouri in Greater St. Louis which operated casinos and associated entertainment and lodging facilities in the United States.

It operated 15 casinos in seven states across the U.S., Isle of Capri properties have nearly 13 million visitors each year. These properties have a total of about 14,000 slot machines, 350 table games, 2,300 hotel rooms; and three dozen restaurants.

== History ==
The company was founded in 1990 by Bernard Goldstein as Kana Corporation.

In April 1992, it was renamed Anubis II Corporation. In June 1992, it was renamed again to Casino America, Inc. and began trading on the NASDAQ under the ticker symbol CSNO. In 1995 it announced a move to trade to the New York Stock Exchange but that did not happen. In September 1998, it became Isle of Capri Casinos, Inc. and changed its ticker symbol to "ISLE."

The company opened its first casino on August 1, 1992, as a publicly traded corporation. Goldstein was known as the "grandfather of riverboat gaming since he owned the first riverboat casino to sail on the Mississippi River.

Goldstein's first casino operations were in the Quad City area of Iowa and Illinois, where Goldstein operated the riverboats Diamond Lady and the Emerald Lady under the corporate name Steamboat Casino Cruises. The two boats, which sailed from Bettendorf, Iowa on April 1, 1991, were two of the first modern riverboat casinos.

Isle of Capri Casinos opened its first casino in Biloxi, Mississippi in August 1992, and was the first gaming establishment to trade on the NASDAQ.

In 2000, Isle of Capri spent $400 million in a multi-part deal to acquire the Lady Luck chain of casinos. Lady Luck Gaming, which owned two adjacent Lady Luck casinos in Lula, Mississippi, one in Natchez, Mississippi, the Miss Marquette casino in Marquette, Iowa, and a half interest in the Lady Luck casino in Bettendorf, Iowa, was bought for $59 million in cash, $177 million in assumed debt, and $22 million to redeem preferred stock. On the same day, Isle of Capri bought the other half of the Bettendorf property from Goldstein's family for $62 million, and the rights to the Lady Luck trademark from Lady Luck's founder, Andrew Tompkins, for $31 million. Six months later, it completed the purchase of the Lady Luck Hotel & Casino in downtown Las Vegas from Tompkins for $14.5 million. The Las Vegas property was sold two years later to a group of real estate investors. The other Lady Luck properties were all rebranded under the Isle of Capri name.

In 2005, its Biloxi casino (but not its hotel) was destroyed and its Lake Charles facilities were damaged by Hurricanes Katrina and Rita, respectively.

In August 2006, Isle of Capri Casinos moved its headquarters from Biloxi to Creve Coeur, Missouri, a suburb of St. Louis. Missouri had offered $4.2 million in tax incentives to lure the operation. 150 employees moved with the headquarters. Company officials said they were looking for new headquarters after evacuating their building three times in 2004–05 due to hurricanes.

On February 14, 2006, Isle of Capri sold the Isle of Capri Bossier City and Isle of Capri Vicksburg to Legends Gaming for $240 million. The properties are now known as "Diamond Jack's".

The company competed for a gambling license in Pittsburgh in 2006, offering $290 million toward the construction of a new arena for the Pittsburgh Penguins as an incentive and thus drawing enormous public support in Pittsburgh. The Pennsylvania Gaming Control Board nevertheless awarded the license to PITG Gaming Majestic Star instead, who was required to partially fund the building of the new arena, the Consol Energy Center.

On March 19, 2007, Isle of Capri purchased Casino Aztar in Caruthersville, Missouri from Columbia Sussex for about $45 million.

In April, 2007 the Company opened the Isle Casino & Racing at Pompano Park in Pompano Beach, Florida.

On July 1, 2007, Isle of Capri opened a new property in Waterloo, Iowa.

In 2008, the company adopted a two-brand strategy, reviving the Lady Luck name for smaller properties with limited amenities, while keeping the Isle of Capri name for properties with full-service facilities like hotel rooms, convention space, and expanded dining options. The Marquette and Caruthersville casinos were the first to be rebranded as Lady Luck properties.

In June 2010, Isle of Capri bought the Rainbow Casino in Vicksburg, Mississippi from Bally Technologies for $80 million. The property was re-branded Lady Luck Casino in 2012.

On December 1, 2010, the Missouri Gaming Commission awarded the company the state's 13th gaming license for a casino project in Cape Girardeau. The casino includes 1,000 slot machines, 28 table games, 3 restaurants, a lounge and terrace overlooking the Mississippi River and a 750-seat event center at an estimated cost of $125 million.

On April 14, 2011, Isle of Capri and Nemacolin Woodlands Resort were selected as the recipients of Pennsylvania's last casino resort license by the state's gaming board. Lady Luck Casino Nemacolin is expected to include 600 slot machines, 28 table games, a casual dining restaurant and lounge.

On October 30, 2012, Isle Casino Cape Girardeau opened to the public.

In November 2012, Isle of Capri sold the Isle Casino Hotel Biloxi to Landry's Inc. for $45 million.

On July 1, 2013, Lady Luck Casino Nemacolin opened to the public.

On February 3, 2014, the Company completed the sale of its Davenport, Iowa casino to Scott County Casino LLC.

On October 18, 2015, the Company closed their Natchez, MS riverfront casino due to low patronage. The Isle of Capri hotel was sold to Natchez competitor Magnolia Bluffs Casino.

On March 13, 2017, the Company sold Lady Luck Marquette to the Casino Queen based in Swansea, Illinois.

On May 1, 2017, the acquisition by Eldorado Resorts, previously announced on September 19, 2016, was completed.

== Properties ==
The properties owned and operated by Isle of Capri Casinos at the time of its acquisition were:

- Isle Casino Hotel Bettendorf — Bettendorf, Iowa
- Isle Casino Hotel Black Hawk — Black Hawk, Colorado
- Isle Casino Cape Girardeau — Cape Girardeau, Missouri
- Isle Casino Hotel Waterloo — Waterloo, Iowa
- Isle Casino Racing Pompano Park — Pompano Beach, Florida
- Isle of Capri Casino Hotel Boonville — Boonville, Missouri
- Isle of Capri Casino Kansas City — Kansas City, Missouri
- Isle of Capri Casino Hotel Lula — Lula, Mississippi
- Lady Luck Casino Black Hawk — Black Hawk, Colorado
- Lady Luck Casino Caruthersville — Caruthersville, Missouri
- Lady Luck Casino Nemacolin — Farmington, Pennsylvania
- Lady Luck Casino Vicksburg — Vicksburg, Mississippi

== Former ==
Properties previously owned by the company include:

- Enchanted Capri casino cruise ship, sailing out of New Orleans, Louisiana
- Isle of Capri Casino Hotel Lake Charles — Lake Charles, Louisiana (Now owned by Caesars Entertainment)
- Isle Casino Coventry — Coventry, England
- Isle of Capri Casino Hotel Biloxi — Biloxi, Mississippi
- Isle of Capri Casino Hotel Bossier City — Bossier City, Louisiana
- Isle of Capri Casino Hotel Tunica — Tunica, Mississippi
- Isle of Capri Casino at Our Lucaya — Lucaya, Bahamas
- Isle of Capri Casino Vicksburg — Vicksburg, Mississippi
- Lady Luck Hotel & Casino — Las Vegas, Nevada
- Lady Luck Casino Marquette — Marquette, Iowa
- Rhythm City Casino Resort — Davenport, Iowa
