= List of casinos in Iowa =

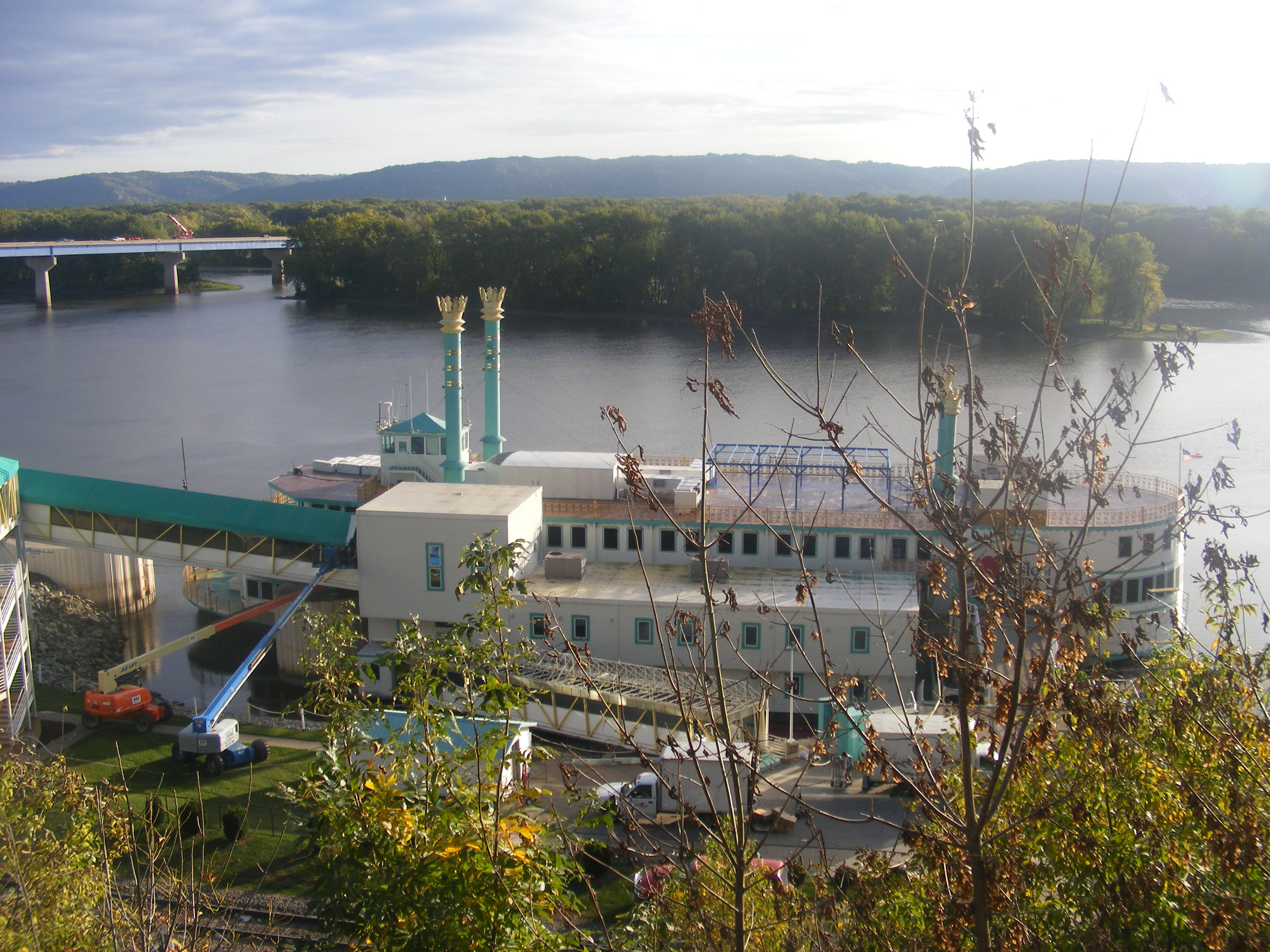
Isle of Capri (Lady Luck) Casino

This is a list of casinos in Iowa.

== List of casinos ==
List of casinos in the U.S. state of Iowa
Casino	City	County	State	District	Type	Comments
Ameristar Casino Council Bluffs	Council Bluffs	Pottawattamie	Iowa		Riverboat
Argosy Casino Sioux City	Sioux City	Woodbury	Iowa		Riverboat	Closed July 30, 2014
Blackbird Bend Casino	Onawa	Monona	Iowa		Native American	Owned by the Omaha Tribe of Nebraska
Casino Queen Marquette	Marquette	Clayton	Iowa		Riverboat
Catfish Bend Casino	Burlington	Des Moines	Iowa		Land-based
Diamond Jo Dubuque	Dubuque	Dubuque	Iowa		Land-based
Diamond Jo Worth	Northwood	Worth	Iowa		Land-based
Grand Falls Casino	Larchwood	Lyon	Iowa		Land-based
Hard Rock Sioux City	Sioux City	Woodbury	Iowa		Land-based
Harrah's Council Bluffs	Council Bluffs	Pottawattamie	Iowa		Land-based
Horseshoe Council Bluffs	Council Bluffs	Pottawattamie	Iowa		Land-based
Isle Casino Bettendorf	Bettendorf	Scott	Iowa		Land-based
Isle Casino Waterloo	Waterloo	Black Hawk	Iowa		Land-based
Lakeside Hotel & Casino	Osceola	Clarke	Iowa		Riverboat
Meskwaki Casino	Tama	Tama	Iowa		Native American	Owned by the Sac and Fox Tribe of the Mississippi in Iowa
Prairie Flower Casino	Carter Lake	Pottawattamie	Iowa		Native American	Owned by the Ponca Tribe of Nebraska
Prairie Meadows	Altoona	Polk	Iowa		Racino
Q Casino	Dubuque	Dubuque	Iowa		Land-based
Rhythm City Casino Resort	Davenport	Scott	Iowa		Land-based
Riverside Casino & Golf Resort	Riverside	Washington	Iowa		Land-based
Wild Rose Casino and Resort	Clinton	Clinton	Iowa		Land-based
Wild Rose Casino and Resort	Emmetsburg	Palo Alto	Iowa		Land-based
Wild Rose Casino and Resort	Jefferson	Greene	Iowa		Land-based
WinnaVegas Casino Resort	Sloan	Woodbury	Iowa		Native American	Owned by the Winnebago Tribe of Nebraska

== See also ==
- Gambling in Iowa
- List of casinos in the United States
- List of casino hotels
