= Karon Kate Blackwell =

American singer-songwriter (born 1942)

- Born: May 7, 1942 (age 84); Ellisville, Mississippi
- Occupation: Singer-songwriter
- Spouse: Marty Allen
- Parent(s): Excell Blackwell, Ina Rie Napier

Karon Kate Blackwell (born May 7, 1942) is an American singer-songwriter. She is best known for her musical comedy act with her husband Marty Allen.

== Biography ==
=== Early life ===
Blackwell was born in 1942 in Ellisville, Mississippi. She was one of six children raised on a family farm by her parents Excell Blackwell and Ina Rie Napier. When her father, a self-taught musician, began teaching her piano, Blackwell's mother insisted on piano and voice lessons. By age 9, she was playing piano at her church. After graduating from high school in Ellisville, she attended the University of Southern Mississippi.

=== Career ===
Blackwell left USM during her first year for Chicago, Illinois. There she began singing and playing piano at small music rooms and events. She performed as the opening act for musicians including Wayne Newton and Burl Ives.

After leaving entertainment, Blackwell met comedian Marty Allen in 1983 while managing a friend's restaurant in Los Angeles. They married on June 17, 1984, at the home of writer Sidney Sheldon. The couple settled in Las Vegas. They began performing comedy and music revue, appearing in Las Vegas, Atlantic City, and other US cities. They toured extensively in Europe, Australia, South America, and East Asia. From 1990 to 1994, Blackwell opened for comedy duo Allen & Rossi in Vegas and Atlantic City.

After Allen & Rossi split amicably in 1994, Allen & Blackwell performed together at the Westward Ho Hotel and Casino, the last large motel on the Las Vegas Strip. In 1999, the couple joined with Irwin Corey and Freddie Roman in a show called Legends of Laffter at Resorts Casino Hotel in Atlantic City. After several months performing on cruise ships, in 2000 Allen and Blackwell began performing at the Gold Coast Hotel and Casino in Las Vegas. After touring with Pat Cooper, they returned to Las Vegas to headline at Suncoast. They went on to perform at the Southpoint Casino and at Palace Station. In 2015, the couple continued to perform in venues around the country, at the Rampart Casino and the Downtown Grand in Las Vegas. In 2016, they performed at the Metropolitan Room in New York City.

Allen died in 2018. Blackwell later toured with The Wonderful Wizard of Song, a musical revue of the works and life of Harold Arlen. Arlen composed the songs for the 1939 film The Wizard of Oz.

== Discography ==
- Karon Kate Blackwell (1992)
- 20/20 Hindsight (2013)

== Published works ==
Blackwell edited her husband's self-published autobiography Hello Dere!

== See also ==
- Marty Allen
