= Sodak Gaming =

Sodak Gaming, Inc.
- Industry: Gaming
- Founded: 1989; 37 years ago
- Headquarters: Rapid City, South Dakota

Sodak Gaming, Inc. was a gaming company based in Rapid City, South Dakota that distributed slot machines to Indian casinos and financed casino projects. It was acquired by International Game Technology (IGT) in 1999 for $230 million.

== History ==
Sodak was formed in 1989 to supply equipment to gambling halls in Deadwood, South Dakota, and soon became the exclusive distributor of IGT machines to tribal casinos. The Promus Companies acquired a 20 percent stake in Sodak in November 1992. Sodak made its initial public offering in June 1993.

Sodak purchased and refitted a riverboat and leased it to Gaming Supply Co., who opened it in December 1994 as the Miss Marquette casino, in Marquette, Iowa. After Gaming Supply defaulted on lease payments, Sodak bought out the company for less than $5.5 million, taking over operation of the casino in July 1996.

The company moved into the South American market in an effort to diversify its revenue base. In May 1995, it began establishing gaming halls and slot route operations in Peru, reaching a total of 1,300 machines by the end of 1996. It opened a casino at the Crowne Plaza Hotel in Quito, Ecuador in March 1996, followed by a gaming hall in Rio de Janeiro, Brazil in June 1996. In June 1998, Sodak announced its decision to divest its South American operations, citing a lack of profitability and an unstable regulatory environment. The ventures in Ecuador, Peru, and Brazil were sold off by the end of the year.

Sodak agreed in March 1999 to be acquired by IGT for $230 million. As IGT executives did not want to operate casinos, the deal called for Sodak to sell the Miss Marquette casino and its interest in a Louisiana casino project. The Miss Marquette was sold to Lady Luck Gaming for $42 million. Sodak's partner in the Louisiana project, Hollywood Casino Corp., purchased Sodak's stake for $2.5 million. The acquisition of Sodak by IGT was completed in September 1999.

Following the acquisition, Sodak continued to operate out of Rapid City as a division of IGT, focused on distributing products to Indian casinos. IGT began a reorganization of its North American businesses in 2005, which included dispersing Sodak's operations around the country, and phasing out the Sodak name.
