= Catfish Bend Casino =

Casino in Burlington, Iowa, US

- Interactive map of Catfish Bend Casino
- Location: Burlington, Iowa; 3001 Winegard Dr; 40.822756°N 91.139355°W
- Opened: November 16, 1994
- No. of rooms: 408
- Signature attractions: FunCity, Huck's Harbor
- Casino type: Land-based
- Owner: Great River Entertainment
- Renovated in: 2007
- Website: Official Site

Catfish Bend Casino is a casino located in Burlington, Iowa. It is part of the FunCity Resort! Entertainment Complex owned by Great River Entertainment.

== History ==
The casino began as a riverboat casino on November 16, 1994 and moved onto land in 2007, once Iowa no longer required casinos to be on navigable waterways.

== Property information ==
The casino includes slot machines, table games, and a sports book. The casino is open 10am to 12am on weekdays and 10am to 2am on weekends. Due to covid-19.

There are two hotels within the complex, the PZAZZ! Resort Hotel and the Catfish Bend Inn & Spa. There are a number of restaurants on the property, as well as an entertainment complex known as FunCity. There is also an indoor/outdoor water park known as Huck's Harbor.

== See also ==
- List of casinos in Iowa
