= Marty Allen =

American comedian (1922–2018)

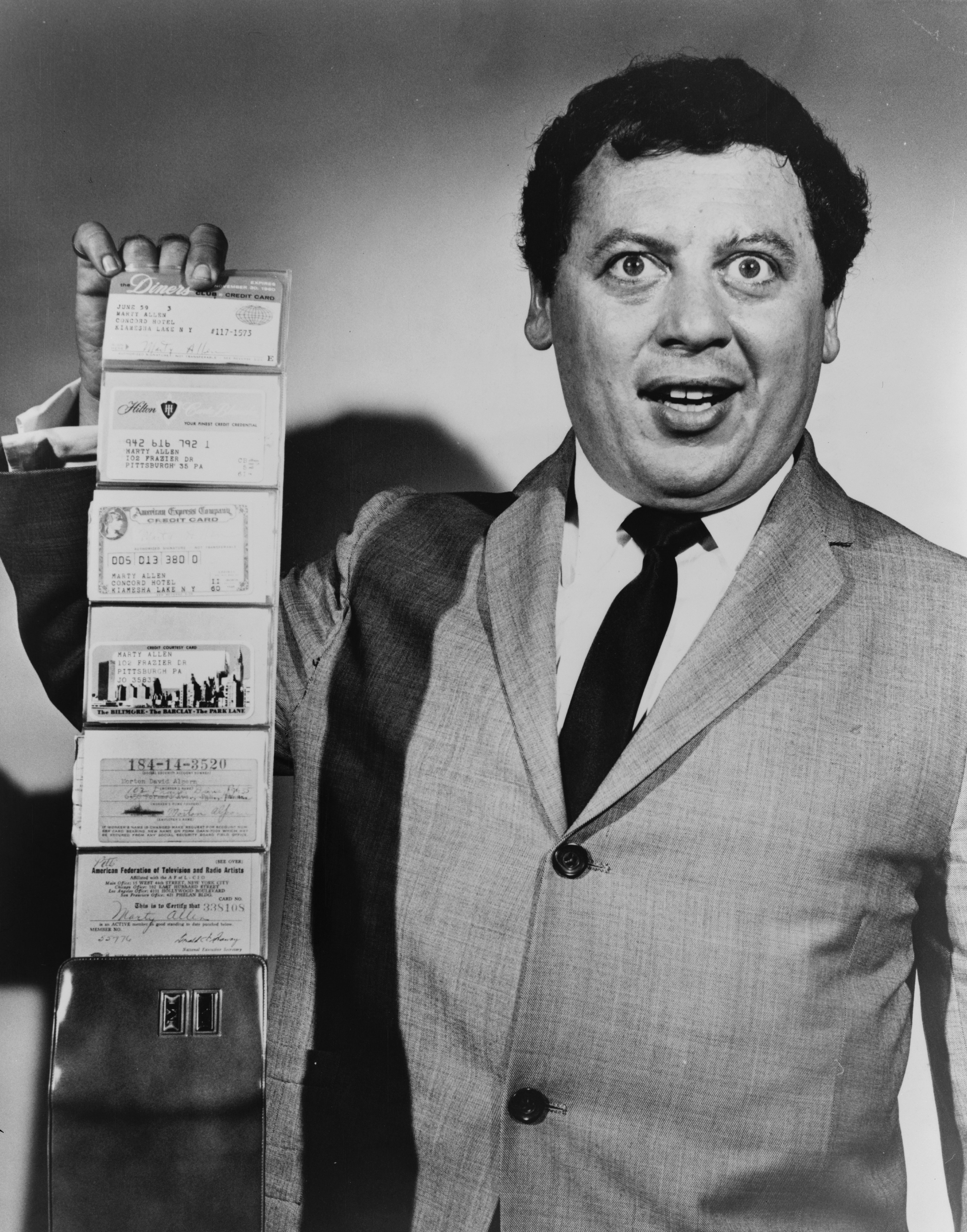
- Allen in 1960
- Born: Morton David Alpern; March 23, 1922; Pittsburgh, Pennsylvania, U.S.
- Died: February 12, 2018 (aged 95); Las Vegas, Nevada, U.S.
- Spouses: Lorraine "Frenchy" Trydelle (m. 1960; died 1976) Karon Kate Blackwell (m. 1984)

Comedy career
- Years active: 1950–2018
- Medium: Stand-up, television, film acting
- Website: Official website (archived August 22, 2009)

Morton David Alpern (March 23, 1922 – February 12, 2018), better known as Marty Allen, was an American comedian, actor, and philanthropist. He worked as a comedy headliner in nightclubs, as a dramatic actor in television roles, and was once called "The Darling of Daytime TV". He also appeared in films, notably the 1966 spy comedy The Last of the Secret Agents?. During his comedy career, Allen also toured military hospitals, and performed for veterans and for active military personnel.

Allen was also a philanthropist. He contributed to the American Cancer Society, The Heart Fund, the March of Dimes, and the Fight for Sight, and he served on the board of the Epilepsy Foundation.

== Early life ==
Allen was born in Pittsburgh, Pennsylvania, to Jewish parents. His father was Louis Alpern (1898–1977, from Romania/Russia), a restaurant and bar owner, and his mother was Elsie Moss Alpern (1901–1979).

He graduated from Taylor Allderdice High School in 1940. He was inducted into their alumni Hall of Fame in 2009.

Allen joined the U.S. Army Air Corps during World War II. He was stationed in Italy, where he attained the rank of sergeant. He earned a Soldier's Medal for stopping a fire in a plane that was being refueled. He saved the lives of the men boarding the burning plane by driving the fuel truck away, returning on foot to the plane, and then putting out the fire by rolling over the flames with his body in uniform. His actions were later honored with a full-dress parade.

== Career ==
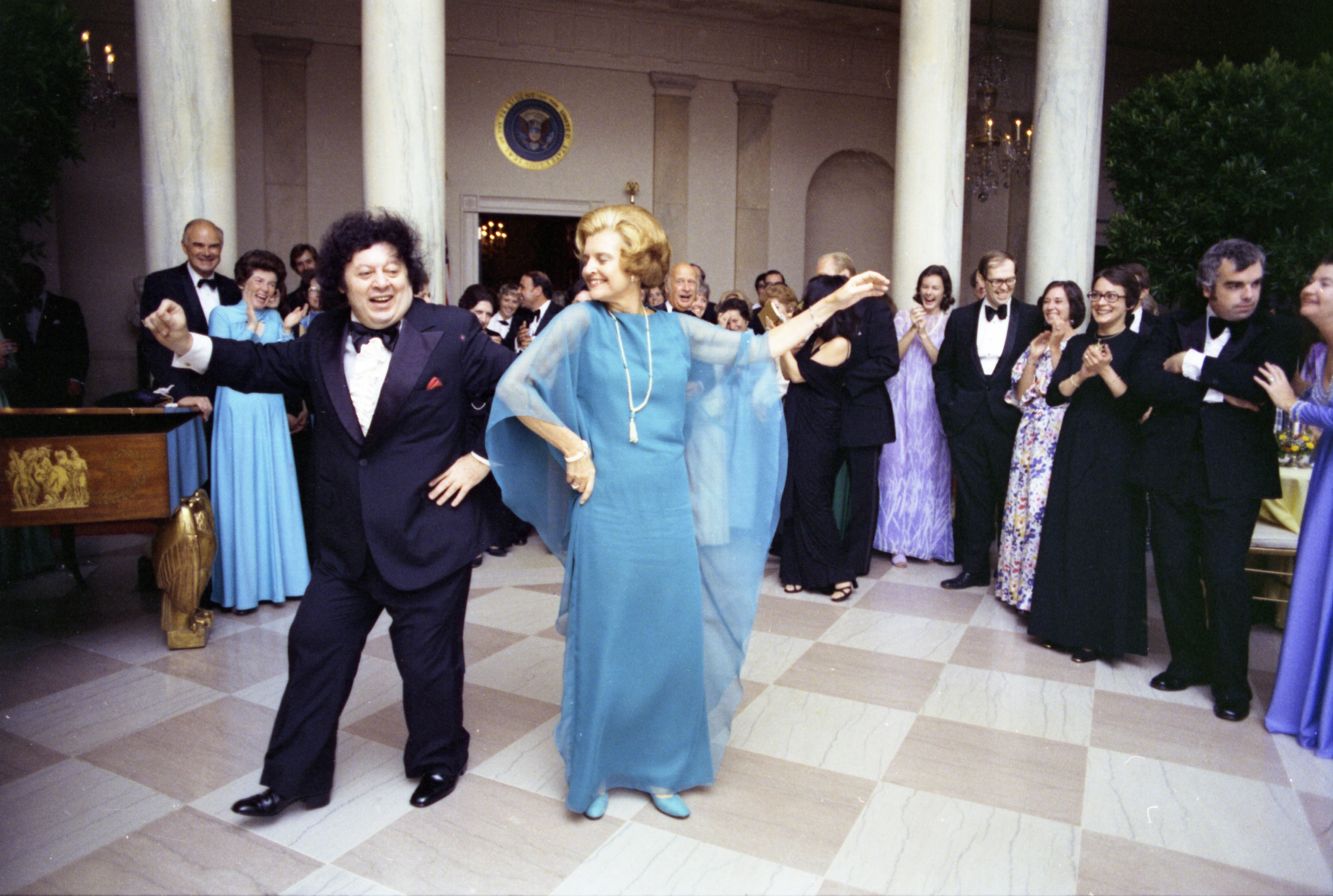
Marty Allen dancing with Betty Ford.

During the early 1950s, Allen and his first comedy partner, Mitch DeWood, worked as an opening act for such stars as Sarah Vaughan, Eydie Gormé, and Nat King Cole. Allen and DeWood also worked many clubs, including the Copacabana until they broke up in 1958 and went their separate ways.

He then became part of the comedy team of Allen & Rossi with Steve Rossi, which resulted in a string of hit comedy albums, 44 appearances on The Ed Sullivan Show (including the famous appearance by The Beatles on February 16, 1964, during which Allen won over the Beatles fans in the audience by announcing "I'm Ringo's mother!"), and the film The Last of the Secret Agents? (1966). They worked together from 1957 to 1968, then parted ways amicably. Allen and Rossi reunited for shows from the 1970s through the 1990s.

He eventually began performing dramatic roles. His debut as a serious actor came on The Big Valley television series as the hapless Waldo Diefendorfer. Throughout the 1970s and into the 1980s, he made hundreds of television appearances, becoming a regular on The Hollywood Squares. He appeared on Circus of the Stars, in a cameo on The Super Mario Bros. Super Show!, on game shows such as Password, and in ten made-for-television movies. He also appeared in theatrical films such as The Great Waltz (1972), Harrad Summer (1974) and A Whale of a Tale (1976).

From the 1980s, he and his second wife, singer-songwriter Karon Kate Blackwell, teamed up to perform their musical comedy act to audiences around the country. In 2007, the duo began performing at the Gold Coast Hotel and Casino in Las Vegas and went on to perform at the Southpoint Casino, at Palace Station, and on cruise ships. In 2015, the couple continued to perform in venues around the country to overflow crowds, at the Rampart Casino and the Downtown Grand in Las Vegas. In 2016, they performed at the Metropolitan Room in New York City.

On Jun 30, 2014, Allen appeared on Gilbert Gottfried's Amazing Colossal Podcast. In February 2015, Allen was the guest on episode 574 of the podcast WTF with Marc Maron.

== Charitable work ==
In 1968, he made a "Hello Dere" tour of military hospitals in the United States (a tour named after a catchphrase he popularized). He repeated the tour annually until 1972. During the tours, he talked with and entertained wounded soldiers who had just returned from Vietnam.

He was also involved in a number of charitable causes, including the American Cancer Society, The Heart Fund, March of Dimes, Fight for Sight, Cerebral Palsy, and was on the board of the Epilepsy Foundation.

== Personal life ==
Allen met Lorraine "Frenchy" Trydelle when she was the reservation and office manager of the Concord Resort Hotel in the Catskills. They were married from 1960 until her death from cancer in 1976.

In 1983, he met his second wife, Karon Kate Blackwell, at a Los Angeles restaurant she was managing. She had prior success as a piano player and songwriter, but had gotten out of show business. The two became friends, then started dating and performing together. They married on June 17, 1984, at the home of writer Sidney Sheldon in Beverly Hills, California. They settled in Las Vegas.

Allen was the father of Tura Satana's daughter Kalani, who learned of her paternity through DNA testing after Satana's death.

== Death ==
On February 12, 2018, Allen died at the age of 95 of complications from pneumonia. His death was at his home in Las Vegas, with wife Karon Kate Blackwell by his side. His interment was at Eden Memorial Park Cemetery in Mission Hills, California.

== Filmography ==
- The Last of the Secret Agents? (1966) as Marty Johnson
- Mister Jerico (1970) as Wally
- The Great Waltz (1972) as Johann Herbeck
- The Ballad of Billie Blue (1972) as Harvey Trip
- Allen and Rossi Meet Dracula and Frankenstein (1974) as Himself
- Mooch (1974) as Himself
- Harrad Summer (1974) as Bert Franklin
- A Whale of a Tale (1976) as Louie
- Murder Can Hurt You! (1980) as Detective Starkos
- Cannonball Run II (1984)

=== Television ===
- The Big Valley (1968) as Waldo Deifendorfer
- Night Gallery (1971) as Edgar Allan Poe
- Monster Squad (1976) as Lorenzo Musica
- Wonderbug (1976) as Indian
- The Krofft Supershow (1976) as Indian
- Murder Can Hurt You (1980) as Detective Strakos
- Madame's Place (1982) as Himself (Episode: "Fans and Fanatics")
- Benson (1985) as Marty (a card dealer) season 6 episode 17 "solid gold"
- The Super Mario Bros. Super Show! (1989) as Imperial Poogah
