= Isle Casino Bettendorf =

Casino hotel in Bettendorf, Iowa

Isle Casino Hotel Bettendorf
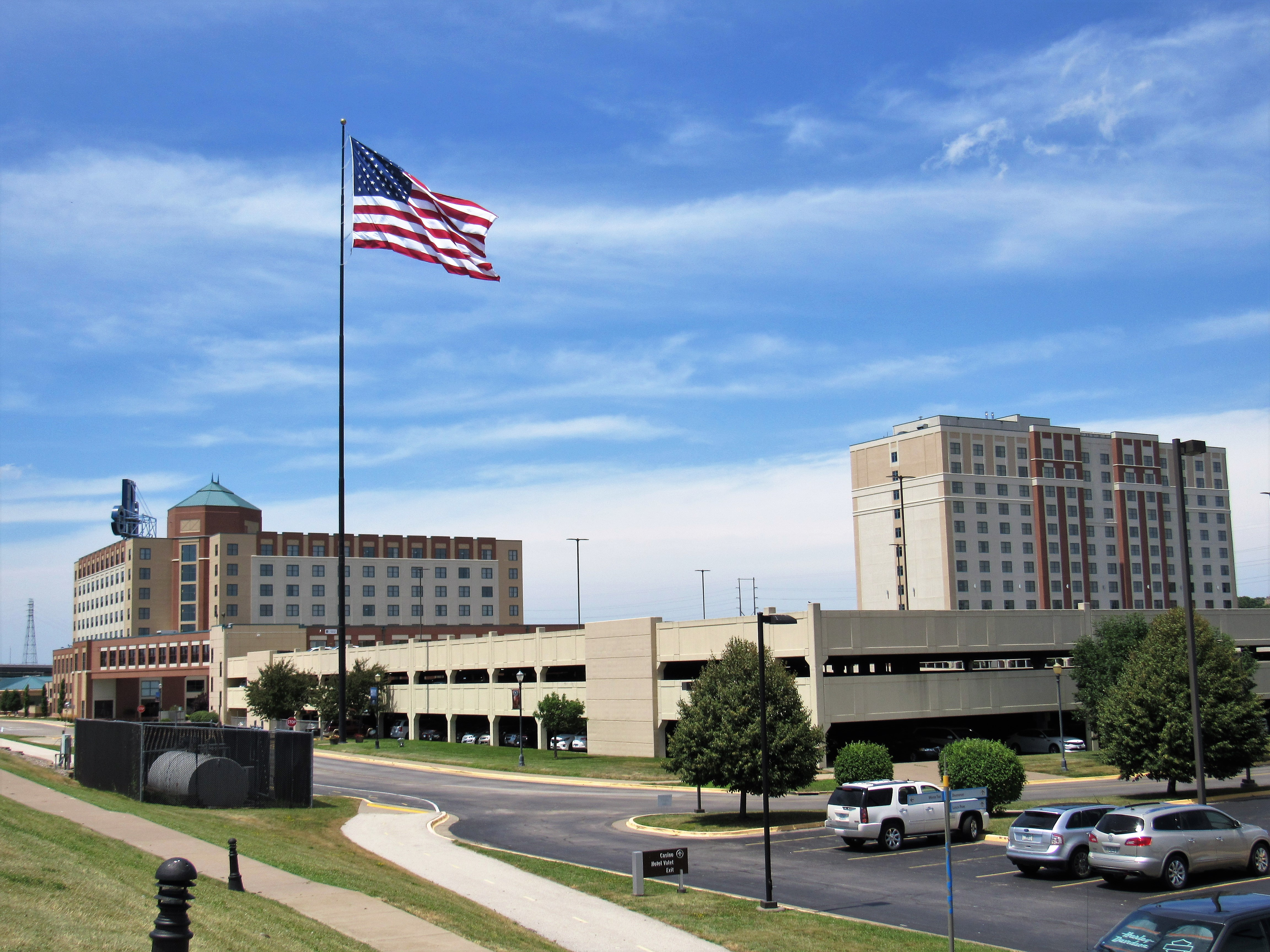
- Interactive map of Isle Casino Hotel Bettendorf
- Location: Bettendorf, Iowa; 1777 Isle Pkwy; 41°31′10″N 90°32′33″W
- Opened: April 21, 1995
- No. of rooms: 514
- Gaming space: 35,000 sq ft (3,300 m^{2})
- Casino type: Land-based
- Owner: Caesars Entertainment
- Previous names: Lady Luck Bettendorf; Isle of Capri Bettendorf
- Renovated in: 2016
- Website: IsleBettendorf.com

Isle Casino Hotel Bettendorf is a casino hotel in Bettendorf, Iowa, owned and operated by Caesars Entertainment. It is one of several casinos located in the Quad Cities. It is the tallest building in the city of Bettendorf.

== History ==
On April 21, 1995, the Lady Luck Bettendorf began operating after being granted an excursion gaming license earlier that year. It was not the first, nor the only riverboat casino at the time in the Quad Cities; Diamond Lady began operating April 1, 1991 in Bettendorf, while President sailed from Davenport, Iowa and Jumer's Casino was working out of Rock Island, Illinois.

In March 2000, Lady Luck Gaming was acquired by Isle of Capri Casinos and the casino was re-branded to reflect the change in ownership.

On June 24, 2016, the casino was moved from a riverboat to a land-based casino. The name, originally Isle of Capri Bettendorf, has since been shortened to Isle Casino Bettendorf. The casino boat Bettendorf Capri was sold to American Queen Steamboat Company to be converted into an overnight passenger vessel to join their fleet of river cruise ships.

In 2017, Eldorado Resorts (later renamed as Caesars Entertainment) acquired Isle of Capri Casinos, including Isle Bettendorf.

== Property information ==
The Isle Casino Bettendorf currently offers 35,000 square feet of gaming space and 514 hotel rooms. There are 935 slot and video poker machines, table games, and sports betting. Three restaurants are on-site: Keller's American Grill and Keller's Express along with the newest addition Midwest Bites. As well as a casino bar, the Lone Wolf.

== See also ==
- List of casinos in Iowa
