= The Last of the Secret Agents? =

1966 film by Norman Abbott

- Theatrical release poster
- Directed by: Norman Abbott
- Screenplay by: Mel Tolkin
- Story by: Norman Abbott; Mel Tolkin
- Produced by: Norman Abbott
- Starring: Marty Allen; Steve Rossi; Nancy Sinatra; Theo Marcuse
- Cinematography: Harold E. Stine
- Edited by: Otho Lovering
- Music by: Pete King
- Distributed by: Paramount Pictures
- Release date: May 25, 1966 (U.S.)
- Running time: 92 minutes
- Country: United States
- Language: English
- Box office: $1,250,000 (est. US/ Canada rentals)

The Last of the Secret Agents? is a 1966 American comedy film that spoofs the spy film genre, starring the then-popular comedy team of Allen & Rossi.

== Plot ==
Two Americans in Paris (Allen & Rossi) are reluctantly recruited by the Good Guys Institute (GGI) led by J. Frederick Duval (John Williams) to thwart the plans of the evil crime and espionage organisation THEM led by Zoltan Schubach (Theo Marcuse). Already with a cache of stolen priceless international art treasures, THEM plots to steal the Venus de Milo with the intention of reattaching its two arms of which they are in possession.

In addition to the then popular spy film genre, the film spoofs many other items of the day such as cigarette commercials. That one involves Marty tiring of Schubach's threat on closed-circuit television and changing the channel to one featuring a cowboy representing the Marlboro Man turning to the camera with a black right eye and saying "I'd rather switch than fight." The movie ends with an early-evening heist involving the Statue of Liberty's removal from its pedestal by helicopter and cable. The segue to that final scene is stock footage of the Manhattan skyline from the northeast blackout of 1965.

== Cast ==
- Marty Allen as Marty Johnson
- Steve Rossi as Steve Donovan
- John Williams as J. Frederick Duval
- Nancy Sinatra as Micheline
- Lou Jacobi as Papa Leo
- Theo Marcuse as Zoltan Schubach
- Carmen Dell'Orefice as Baby May Zoftig
- Remo Pisani as Them I
- Ben Lessy as Harry
- Loren Ewing as GGI Man
- Sig Ruman as Prof. Werner von Koeing
- Larry Duran as Them II
- Wilhelm von Homburg as GGI Man
- Aida Fries as Belly dancer
- Harvey Korman as German Colonel
- Edy Williams as Edy
- Thordis Brandt as Fred Johnson
- Ed Sullivan as himself

== Production ==
Allen & Rossi were a popular comedy team in their nightclub and television appearances, notably on The Ed Sullivan Show. Paramount Pictures had highly successful comedy teams of Bob Hope and Bing Crosby in the 1940s and Dean Martin and Jerry Lewis in the 1950s and no doubt wished to recreate their success with the duo's screen debut in the film. (This proved not to be the case, and no sequels were produced for the film, although the duo did appear in the 1974 film Allen and Rossi Meet Dracula and Frankenstein.)

Mel Tolkin had written for Your Show of Shows and had many other comedy credits, whilst Norman Abbott, the nephew of Bud Abbott, had the experience of directing many successful American television comedy shows. Steve Rossi wanted to incorporate material from their comedy routine into the film but his ideas were refused.

== Music ==
Nancy Sinatra had made several film appearances previously, and it was planned that she would sing a song written for her by Paramount's Famous Music division's Burt Bacharach and Hal David, but it was cut due to budget constraints. During post-production in January 1966, Sinatra's "These Boots Are Made for Walkin'" composed by Lee Hazlewood was a smash hit.

Paramount ordered the producer to have Sinatra sing in the film with Hazlewood quickly composing a title song for her reminiscent of John Barry's "Thunderball". The resulting song, "The Last of the Secret Agents", did not appear on the Pete King soundtrack album. Neal Hefti wrote the song "You Are" for Steve Rossi, which does appear on the soundtrack, as does the song "Don Jose, Ole" written by Tolkin and Abbott. Sinatra's title song was reused as an end title song in Bill Murray's The Man Who Knew Too Little.

Even though this film lampoons the James Bond franchise, Sinatra would the following year ironically record two versions of Barry's song "You Only Live Twice" for the 1967 Bond film of the same name.

== See also ==
- List of James Bond parodies and spin-offs
