= Steve Rossi =

American actor (1932–2014)

- Rossi in The Garry Moore Show, 1962
- Born: Joseph Charles Michael Tafarella; May 25, 1932; New York City, New York, U.S.
- Died: June 22, 2014 (aged 82); Las Vegas, Nevada, U.S.

Comedy career
- Medium: Stand-up, television and film acting

Joseph Charles Michael Tafarella (May 25, 1932 – June 22, 2014), better known as Steve Rossi, was an American stand-up comedian and singer, best known from his work with Marty Allen as Allen & Rossi.

== Early life ==
Born in New York City in 1932, Rossi earned a Bachelor of Arts degree in communication, arts & theatre and Greek & Latin from Loyola Marymount University, Los Angeles. He also served as an officer in the United States Air Force.

== Career ==
The comedian was discovered by Mae West who, with her manager Jerry Franks, saw him in 1953 as the lead of The Student Prince at the Civic Light Orchestra in Los Angeles. Under his birth name (Joseph Tafarella), Rossi then signed to a nightclub show with West at Ciro's in Los Angeles. The show was subsequently moved to the Sahara Hotel in Las Vegas. At one point he started using the stage name Steve Rossi. According to Rossi, West picked "Steve" because she was dating actor Steve Cochran at the time, and the inspiration for "Ross" came from one of her managers named Bernie Ross; an "i" was added to the end of Ross to reflect Rossi's Italian heritage. West and Rossi toured in 1953 and 1954. Rossi wrote the musical numbers he performed in the show with West.

In 1957, he formed the Allen & Rossi comedy duo with Marty Allen. Rossi played straight man to Allen, and the pair made many appearances together in the 1950s and 1960s, including 44 appearances on The Ed Sullivan Show. They released multiple comedy albums; co-starred in a feature film, The Last of the Secret Agents?; and also performed live in Las Vegas.

Rossi continued his singing career as a solo artist, recording for several labels in the 1960s and 1970s, including ABC Records' ABC-Paramount label, Red Bird Records, Roulette Records, and Columbia Records. Milton Berle famously lost a bet of one week's salary to Rossi when Rossi correctly predicted that, at the 1962 Academy Awards, Bob Hope would tell a joke about Elizabeth Taylor. In 1963, Allen & Rossi were the first comedians to go to Washington, D.C., to lobby Congress on the House floor.

In 1968 Marty Allen's wife died, devastating Allen. The Allen & Rossi team split amicably when Allen withdrew from show business for a few years. Steve Rossi teamed for less than three months with nightclub and TV comedian Joe E. Ross in an act called "Rossi & Ross." The team of Rossi & Ross played once on Ed Sullivan and disbanded in January 1969. In 1969, he announced a pairing with comedian Slappy White, creating the comedy act Rossi & White. The interracial comedy team released the album I Found Me a White Man—You Find Yourself One on Roulette Records. In 1971, in an attempt to sell more tickets, Overseas National Airways employed the duo as live onboard entertainment.

In 1972 Rossi invited Las Vegas stand-up comic Bernie Allen (born Bernard Allen Kleinberg, 1916–2004) to join his act, and the team became known once again as Allen & Rossi. The team worked successfully in nightclubs and television until 1978.

In 1975 Rossi was reported by entertainment reporter Earl Wilson to have received a mysterious visitor claiming to be Howard Hughes. Hughes had come to see Rossi in Vancouver to prove he was not dead yet. Rossi later teamed up with Sandy Hackett, son of Buddy Hackett. They appeared at several venues in Las Vegas, including at the Star Bright theatre. Rossi and Allen reunited several times for subsequent projects, including a film released in 1974 and stage performances together from 1984 to 1985, and again from 1990 to 1994. Rossi appeared as a guest on The Howard Stern Show many times in the 1980s and early 1990s.

=== Later years ===
Rossi presented a spoof of Washington, D.C. called "Laffs, Sex & Politics," co-starring Buddy Hackett, in 2000. He had a role in the Brad Pitt movie The Mexican (2001). In 2004, Rossi was inducted into the Show Business Legends Hall of Fame at the Tropicana Hotel in Las Vegas. His book, Adult Stand-up Comedy For Wannabe Comedians: Hilarious Stand-up Routines, Jokes and Stories, was issued in 2006. In 2007, he was part of a touring cabaret show titled "5 Star Revue" with Gary Collins, Mary Ann Mobley, Ruta Lee and Ronnie Schell. In 2009, he appeared along with Schell off-Broadway in Don't Leave it All to Your Children. He also performed his stand-up comedy act at Feinstein's in New York City.

Permanently living in Las Vegas, Nevada, he used his website blog to promote his upcoming appearances. In August 2010, the Comedy Talks speakers series of the University of San Francisco hosted a panel discussion including Rossi, Rich Little, and Carol Channing. In 2012, Rossi re-released "The World's Dirtiest Joke Book" in electronic book format. The same year, he attended the opening of Rich Little's show "Jimmy Stewart and Friends", with strip headliner Terry Fator. Steve is credited as co-writer of the play.

== Death ==
Rossi died in a Las Vegas hospice on June 22, 2014, from cancer, aged 82. He was survived by his wife, Karma, two children and two grandchildren.
