= Rhythm City Casino Resort =

Casino resort in Iowa

- Interactive map of Rhythm City Casino Resort
- Location: Davenport, Iowa; 7077 Elmore Ave; 41.594778°N 90.530565°W
- Opened: June 16, 2016
- Gaming space: 32,000 sq ft (3,000 m^{2})
- Casino type: Land-based
- Owner: Elite Casino Resorts
- Previous names: The President
- Public transit access: Davenport CitiBus
- Website: RhythmCityCasino.com

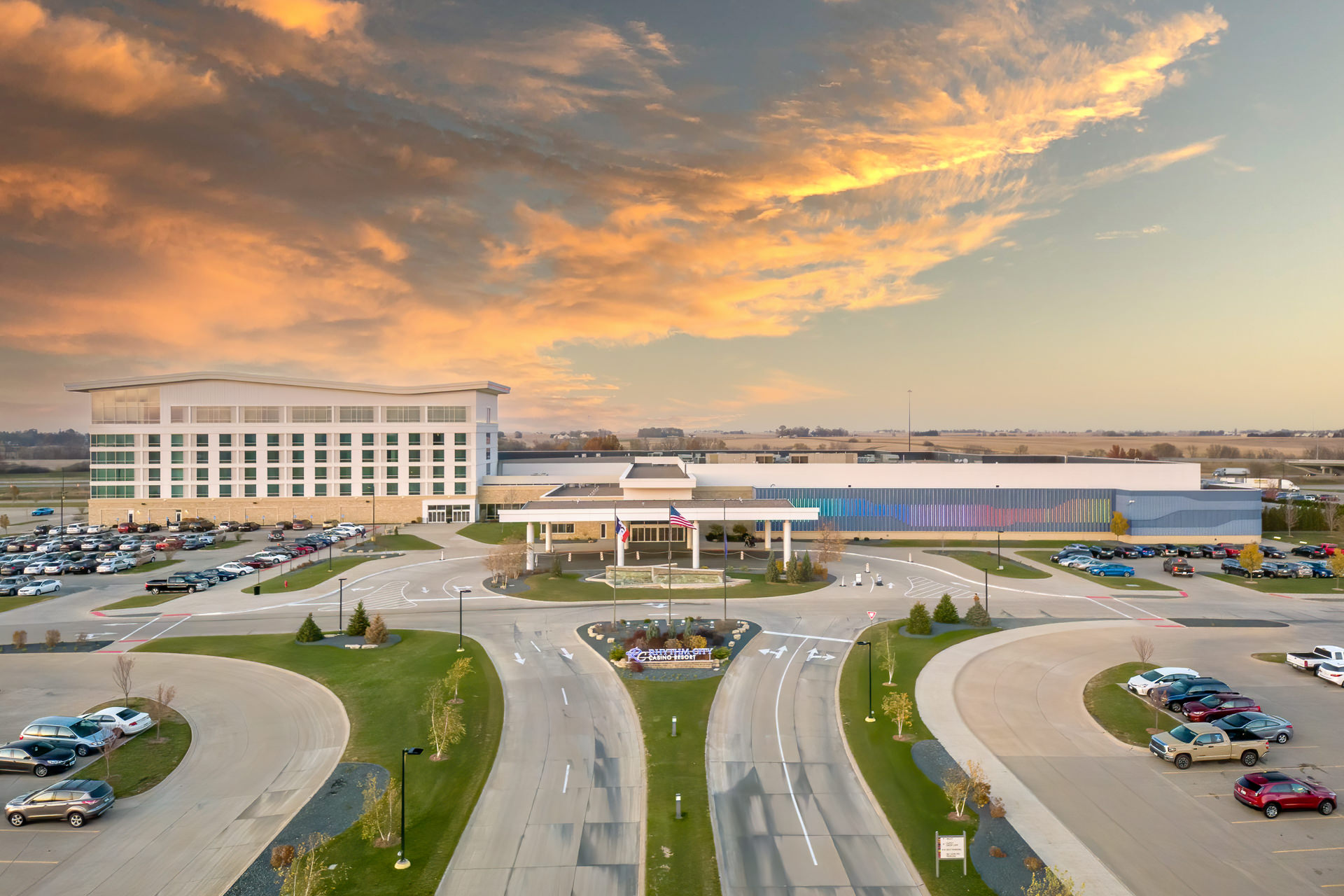
Aerial view of Rhythm City Casino Resort

Rhythm City Casino Resort is a casino and resort located in Davenport, Iowa. The property features over 32,000 square feet of gaming space, including 1,000 slot machines, 25 table games, and the Elite Sports Book. The resort also offers a hotel, three restaurants, a full service spa and an event center. Conveniently situated near the intersection of I-80 and I-74, the casino is part of Elite Casino Resorts, which also owns Riverside Casino & Golf Resort in Riverside, IA and Grand Falls Casino Resort located in Lyon County, IA.

== History ==
The casino began as a riverboat casino named The President in 1991 shortly after the legalization of gambling in Iowa. It later became the Rhythm City Casino, but the casino moved to a land-based site in the Northern part of Davenport in 2016. The former boat was still parked on the river in Davenport until late 2016. When the property moved additional outlets were added to the property including three restaurants, Ruthie's Steak & Seafood, Draft Day Sports Lounge, and Robert's Buffet. As well as a full service spa. Rhythm City's Event Center has brought several big acts through the Quad Cities including legendary acts like The Charlie Daniels Band, Eddie Money, Wayne Newton and Trace Adkins. Others who have performed since the opening in 2016 is Sara Evans, Gary Allan, Chris Janson, and Josh Turner. Several comedians have performed there also including Carlos Mencia, Frank Caliendo, and Craig Ferguson.

== Property information ==
Rhythm City currently has over 32,000 square feet of gaming space with 1,000 slot machines, 25 table games, the Elite Sports Book, a hotel, three restaurants, a full service spa and an event center.

== See also ==
- List of casinos in Iowa
