= Bernard Goldstein (casino owner) =

American attorney and entrepreneur

- Born: February 5, 1929; Rock Island, Illinois, U.S.
- Died: July 5, 2009 (aged 80); Bettendorf, Iowa, U.S.
- Resting place: Hebrew Cemetery, Rock Island
- Education: University of Illinois at Urbana–Champaign (J.D.)
- Occupations: Attorney and entrepreneur

Bernard "Bernie" Goldstein (February 5, 1929 – July 5, 2009) was an American attorney and entrepreneur. He was the founder and chairman of Isle of Capri Casinos and is sometimes called the "father of modern riverboat gambling" because he was the first person to run riverboat casinos in the Midwest and South after they became legal in the 1990s.

== Early life ==
He received his undergraduate and law degrees from the University of Illinois at Urbana–Champaign. He was admitted to the Iowa bar in 1951.

== Alter Companies ==
He joined the Davenport, Iowa scrap metal firm, Alter Companies, owned by his father-in-law, Frank R. Alter, in 1950 and served as secretary/treasurer until 1964, when he was elected executive vice president. He became president in 1973 and chairman in 1980.

In 1960, he launched a barge and tugboat service on the Mississippi River, Alter Barge Line, to transport the scrap

Its first boat was the MV Frank R. Alter. Its boats are marked by districtive yellow trim. The boats initially transported coal upriver and scrap metal down and then expanded into carrying grain.

In 1998, he wrote a book about the company, Navigating the century: A personal account of Alter Company's first hundred years.

== Riverboat gambling ==
In 1989, as he approached retirement he began lobbying Iowa to pass riverboat gambling. His boat the M/V Diamond Lady was the first legal riverboat casino in modern times when it sailed from Bettendorf on April 1, 1991. The President, a gambling boat owned by John E. Connelly, opened 30 minutes later in Davenport.

He opened the first casino in the South in Biloxi, Mississippi on August 1, 1992.

In 1992, the company was listed on NASDAQ under the ticker symbol ISLE.

It now operates in six states across the U.S. with approximately 2 million visitors each year.
