= Allen & Rossi =

American, mid-20th century comedy duo

Steve Rossi and Marty Allen in The Garry Moore Show, 1962

Allen & Rossi was a comedy team composed of Marty Allen and Steve Rossi, active from 1957 until 1968.

== History ==
In 1967, Allen & Rossi credited Nat King Cole for bringing them together. Allen & Rossi would tour for three years with Cole and appeared regularly on his TV show. "Steve was talking to Nat one day and mentioned that he would like to try something different - maybe a comedy thing," Allen said. "I was working at a club in Chicago with Steve Lawrence and Eydie Gorme when I got a call from Steve. I had never thought much about a partner, but I said, 'Well, come on out.' We met and I figured, well, here's a good-looking guy and he can sing, so maybe we can do something."

They appeared on over 700 television shows including 44 appearances on The Ed Sullivan Show, including two of the four Ed Sullivan episodes on which the Beatles appeared. They recorded 16 comedy albums, the title of one using their signature comedy catch phrase of "Hello Dere!" The team also appeared in a spy spoof film The Last of the Secret Agents (1966) and their own TV special. Allen said, of their catch phrase, "We were into the act and I just went blank... and I looked at Steve and said, 'Hello dere . . . hello dere.' Then suddenly everyone in the club was saying it - hello dere."

Following their split in 1968, both performed regularly with different partners. They reunited numerous times throughout the next three decades. In 1984 and 1985 they teamed for a series of shows in Atlantic City and toured. They were given a lifetime contract beginning in 1990 to appear at the Vegas World Casino Hotel (now the Stratosphere Hotel and Casino) in Las Vegas. They appeared as a team from 1990 to 1994 and toured together late in 1994 before splitting once again.

Rossi died of cancer in 2014; Allen died from complications of pneumonia in 2018.
