= Isle Casino Waterloo =

Isle Casino Hotel Waterloo
- Interactive map of Isle Casino Hotel Waterloo
- Location: Waterloo, Iowa; 777 Isle of Capri Blvd; 42°26′48″N 92°18′32″W
- Opened: June 30, 2007
- Gaming space: 37,442 sq ft (3,478.5 m^{2})
- Casino type: Land-based
- Owner: Caesars Entertainment
- Website: IsleWaterloo.com

Isle Casino Hotel Waterloo is a casino in Waterloo, Iowa, owned and operated by Caesars Entertainment.

== History ==
The casino opened June 30, 2007, after significant lobbying by the Black Hawk County Gaming Association to bring a casino to this area of the state. At the time of opening, the casino was operated by Isle of Capri Casinos.

In 2017, Eldorado Resorts (later renamed as Caesars Entertainment) acquired Isle of Capri Casinos, including Isle Waterloo.

== Property information ==
The casino hosts over 1,000 slot machines, 25 table games, and sports betting through a partnership with William Hill, in its 37,442 square feet. There is a hotel on-site and 3 restaurants.

== See also ==
- List of casinos in Iowa
