= Downtown Grand =

Hotel and casino in Nevada, United States

Coordinates: 36.1719°N 115.1418°W

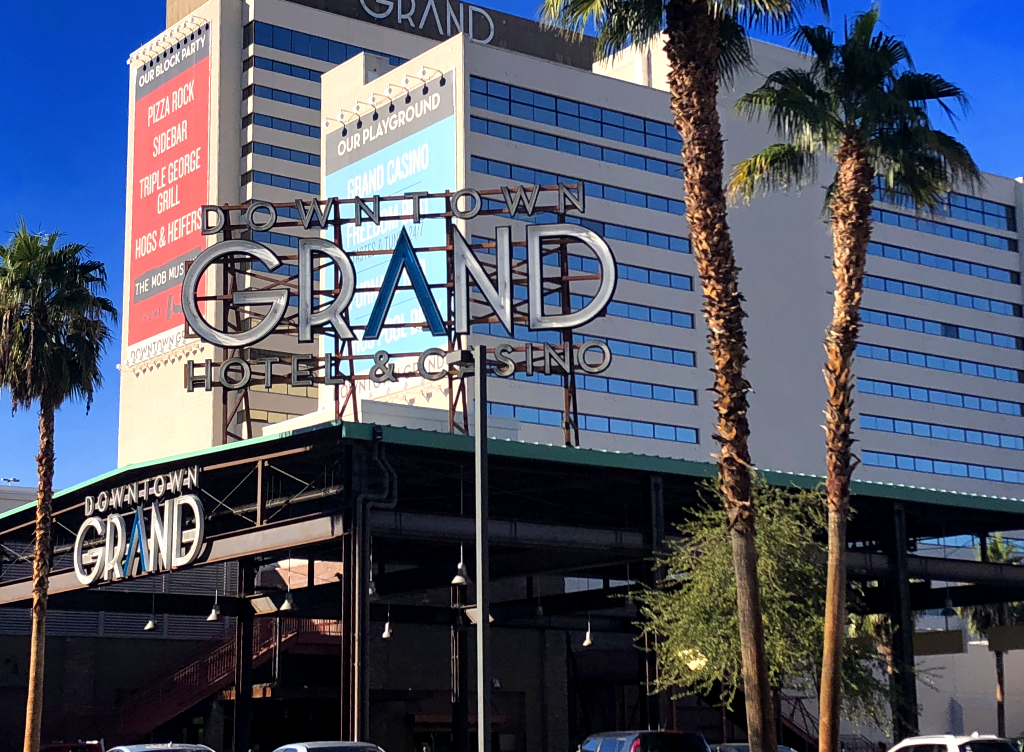
- Interactive map of Downtown Grand
- Location: Las Vegas, Nevada, United States; 206 N 3rd Street
- Opened: 1961
- No. of rooms: 1,124
- Gaming space: 24,085 sq ft (2,237.6 m^{2})
- Notable restaurants: Freedom Beat; Hogs and Heifers; Sidebar; Triple George Grill
- Casino type: Land-based
- Owner: CIM Group
- Operating license holder: Fifth Street Gaming
- Previous names: Honest John's (1961–1968); Lady Luck (1968–2006)
- Renovated in: 2000, 2012–13, 2019–20
- Website: downtowngrand.com

The Downtown Grand, formerly the Lady Luck, is a hotel and casino in downtown Las Vegas, Nevada, United States. It is owned by CIM Group and operated by Fifth Street Gaming. The property originated as Honest John's, a news stand and barbershop with a small number of slot machines. It opened in 1961, and became a full casino three years later, under the new ownership of Andy Tompkins. He renamed it the Lady Luck in 1968, and enlarged it during the 1970s. Tompkins added a small hotel in 1983, and later expanded it with two towers, opened in 1986 and 1989, respectively.

In the 1990s, the Lady Luck name expanded to other casinos around the U.S. through Lady Luck Gaming, overseen by part-owner Tompkins. The Lady Luck changed ownership several times beginning in 2000, and eventually closed on February 11, 2006, for a year-long renovation. However, the project was derailed by financial problems.

CIM purchased the shuttered property in 2007, and eventually launched a $100 million renovation. The property reopened on October 27, 2013, as the Downtown Grand. It includes a 24,085 sq ft (2,237.6 m^{2}) casino and several restaurants. A new hotel tower was added in 2020, increasing the room count from 629 to 1,124,which was followed, in 2025, by an expansion loan default, which resulted in the property being put into receivership in January 2026; then contracted for acquisition by Vegas Ventures LLC. that summer.

== History ==
The site originated as Honest John's, a news stand and barbershop which included 17 slot machines. It was built as part of Ogden Square Shopping Center, located at the northeast corner of 3rd Street and Ogden Avenue. Honest John's opened in January 1961, along with the shopping center, and became a fulltime casino in 1964, under the new ownership of Andy Tompkins.

=== Lady Luck (1968–2006) ===
In January 1968, Tompkins changed the casino's name to Lady Luck. Four years later, the casino expanded by taking over the remainder of the shopping center. It was expanded again in 1979, with a neon design by Jack Dubois of Ad Art. A small hotel was added in 1983, and a parking garage along Ogden Avenue was leased from the city to the Lady Luck soon thereafter. Two hotel towers were added in 1986 and 1989, respectively.

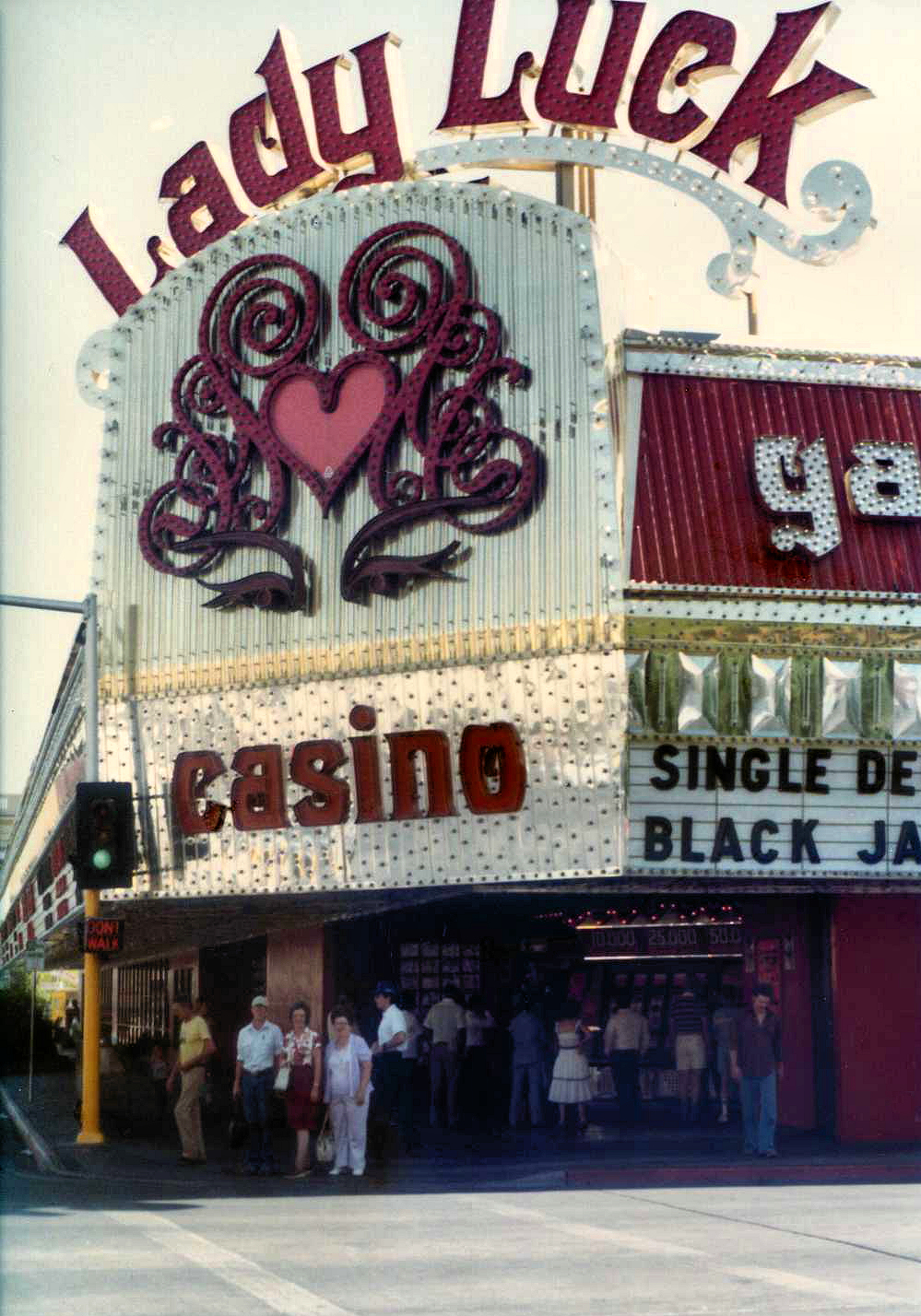
The Lady Luck casino entrance in 1983

In the 1990s, the Lady Luck name expanded to other casinos around the U.S. under the ownership of Lady Luck Gaming, overseen by part-owner Tompkins. Isle of Capri Casinos merged with Lady Luck Gaming in 2000, and acquired the Las Vegas property as a result. Isle of Capri soon renovated the hotel rooms, restaurants, and showroom. In March 2002, Isle of Capri announced that it would sell the property due to repeated revenue losses. Company chairman Bernard Goldstein said the sale would allow Isle of Capri to "return its focus to what we know best, operating regional casinos outside of Las Vegas and Atlantic City."

A group of investors, under the name AMX Nevada LLC, bought the Lady Luck in October 2002. Hospitality Systems LLC was brought on to manage the hotel, while gaming operations were handled by the Henry Brent Company, owned by Andrew Donner. In the property's west tower, AMX converted approximately 16 hotel rooms into timeshares, but eventually scrapped plans to convert the entire structure.

The Henry Brent Company purchased the Lady Luck from AMX in April 2005, at a cost of $24 million, and announced plans for a renovation which would require gutting portions of the property. The company also planned to eventually demolish the original two- and four-story hotel buildings and redevelop the site with up to 1,000 new rooms. The project, including the planned expansion, would cost up to $25 million and take up to three years to complete.

Some renovation work was already underway by November 2005, with several restaurants closed to allow for work to be done. The overall property was to remain open during the year-long renovation project, but it was soon determined that this would be unfeasible. According to Donner, it "would be difficult to provide guests with a good experience or attract the number of visitors we'd need to maintain our staff during the renovation." The property had approximately 700 workers.

==== Closure ====
With the exception of its timeshares, the Lady Luck closed on February 11, 2006, with little fanfare. The remainder of the year was spent demolishing the property's interior for renovation work, which was delayed as a result of widespread commercial construction throughout the Las Vegas Valley, causing worker shortages. The property, which was to be renamed, was not expected to reopen until at least the end of 2007. Canyon Capital Realty Advisors had agreed to finance the renovation, but had pulled out of the deal by February 2007, further hampering progress.

Later in 2007, the Lady Luck was acquired by CIM Group, following a meeting with Las Vegas mayor Oscar Goodman, who viewed the site as a "carcass". City officials hoped that CIM would reopen the property as soon as possible, due to its central location near attractions such as the Fremont Street Experience and the upcoming Mob Museum. CIM considered the addition of a pedestrian retail component along 3rd Street, helping connect the Fremont Street Experience to the Mob Museum.

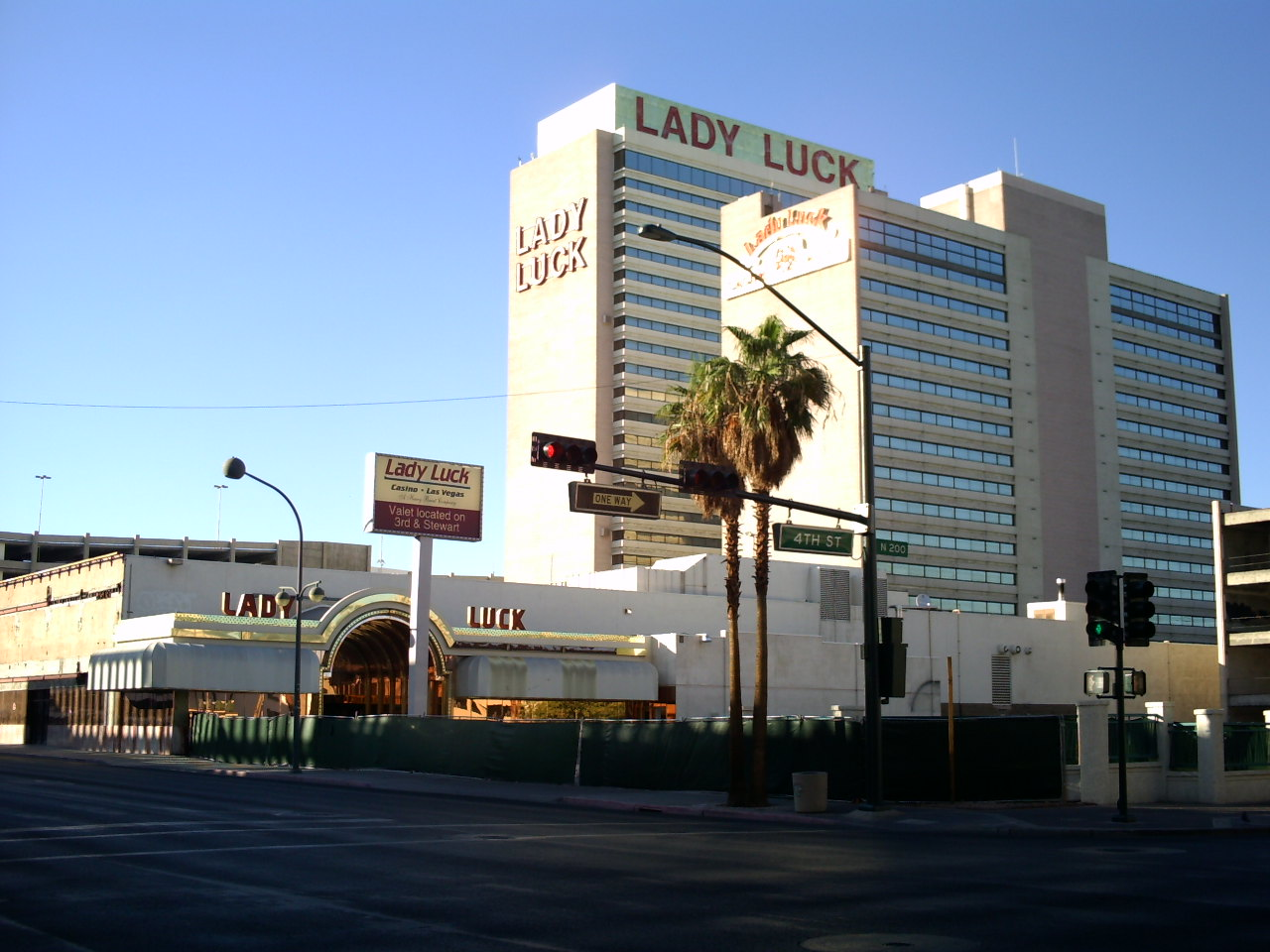
The Lady Luck in 2008

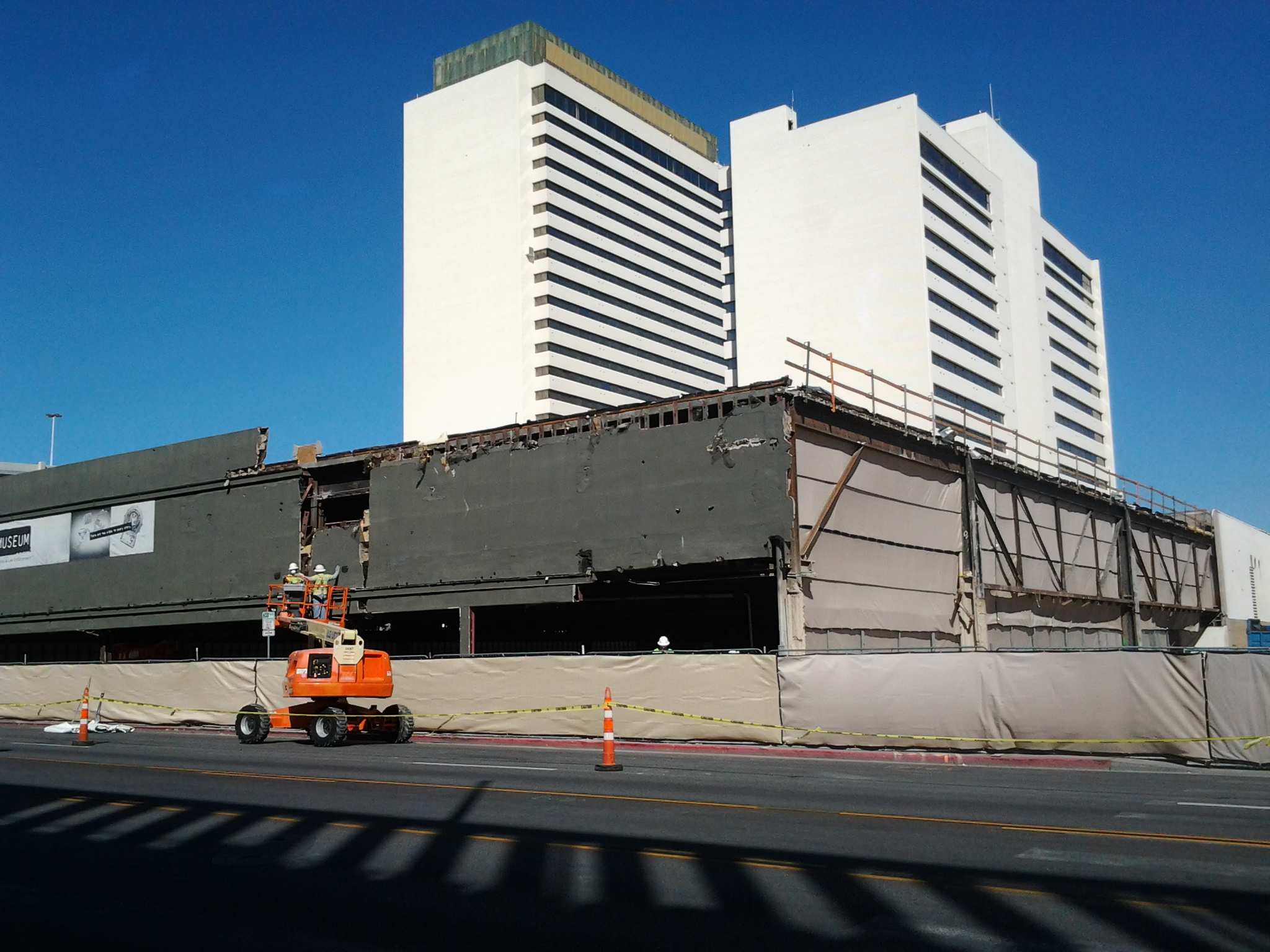
Workers tearing down portions of the casino for renovation in October 2012

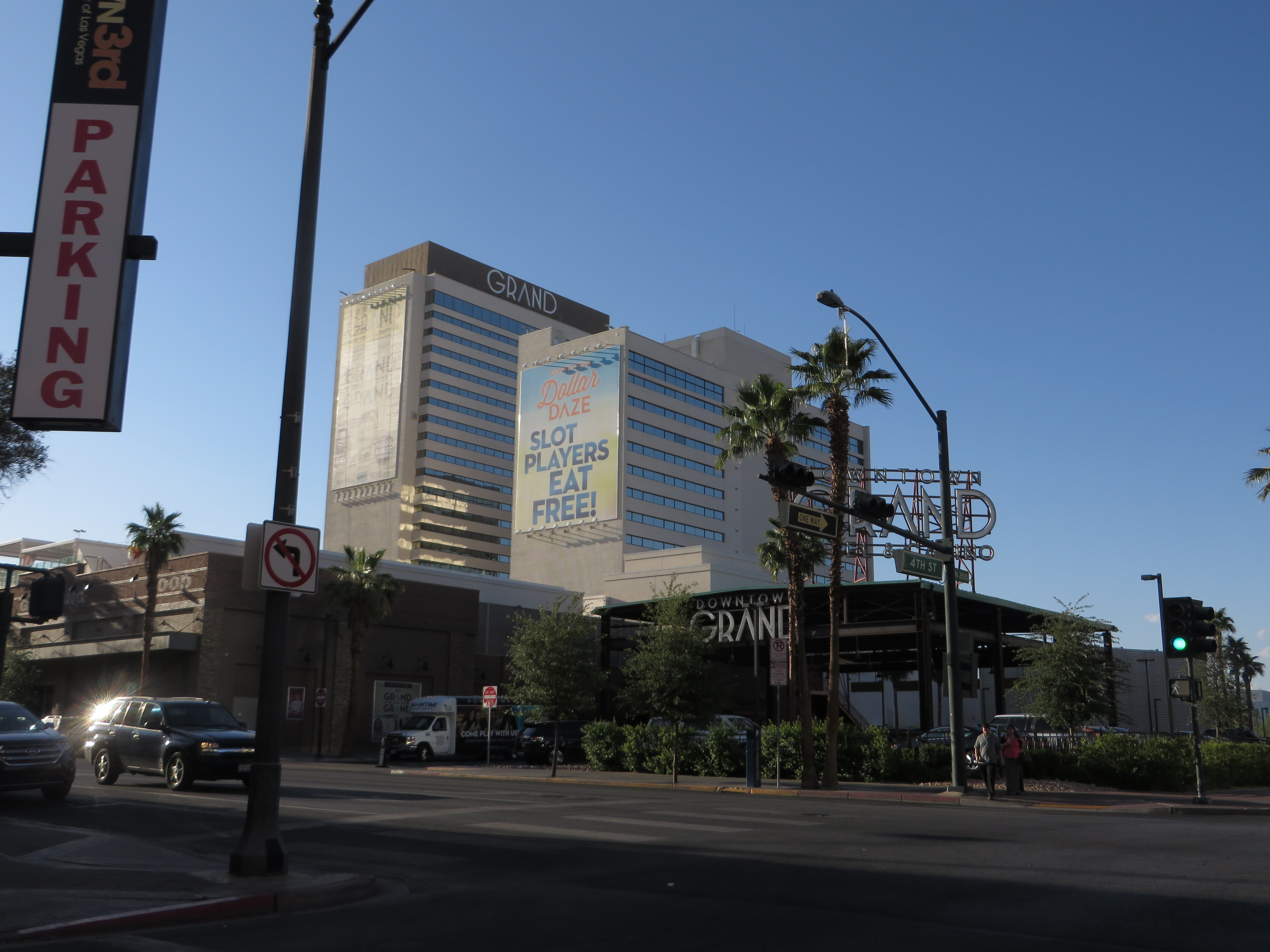
The Downtown Grand in 2015

CIM also sought to acquire nearby acreage from the city, used then as a memorial park for historian Frank Wright, to redevelop it as part of a revitalized Lady Luck. CIM spent a year negotiating the possible purchase of city land, including the parking garage, with an agreement reached in July 2008. Goodman applauded the attempt to reopen the hotel-casino: "For the past several years I have seen a rotting corpse. The Lady Luck structure has been a blight."

CIM's redevelopment plans were derailed by the Great Recession. Goodman, in July 2009, said the Lady Luck "is a disaster." He made note of the property's four-story hotel building, now a gutted concrete and steel structure, calling it a "carcass." Debris had also piled up on the site, sparking concerns about code violations. City officials wanted CIM to do a better job of keeping sidewalks and landscaping clean near the site. The four-story hotel structure was demolished later that month.

New plans for remodeling and expansion were submitted to the city in 2010, having been modified as a result of the recession. Donner's company, now known as Resort Gaming Group, was brought on to manage the project for CIM and the casino once it opened. However, Fifth Street Gaming was chosen the following year to replace Resort Gaming, allowing the latter to focus on other commitments.

=== Downtown Grand (2013–present) ===
In October 2011, plans were announced to rename the Lady Luck as the Downtown Grand. Construction began on November 20, 2012, after a year of demolition work. The renovations cost more than $100 million, and included a new, warehouse-inspired design, with elements such as catwalks. Because of its new brick facade, the name "Brixton" was briefly considered for the hotel-casino, until executives learned of riots that occurred in the London area of the same name.

The Downtown Grand opened on October 27, 2013. Casino executive Steve Wynn was among those in attendance, saying of the Downtown Grand, "We are getting back to our roots when Fremont Street was available to (guests) of any income level." Middle-class Chinese tourists were a key demographic for the new property. The hotel was expanded in 2020 with the opening of a new tower.

By July 2024, CIM was seeking a buyer for the Downtown Grand. In March 2025, Penske Media Corporation, owner of the magazine Rolling Stone, was reportedly in discussions to purchase and rebrand the property as a Rolling Stone hotel-casino. After negotiations with Penske failed; in December 2025, CIM Group defaulted on the $90 million construction loan used for its 2020 Gallery Tower expansion. Following a resulting lawsuit filed that month by lender Banc of California, the property entered receivership and was listed for sale, under Nevada’s Uniform Commercial Real Estate Receivership Act. In August 2026, Massachusetts-based Vegas Ventures won its bid to acquire the property from the Receiver. The sale was approved by a Clark Country District judge on October 7, 2026. Casino operations continue under lease to Fifth Street Gaming.

== Features ==
=== Hotel and casino ===
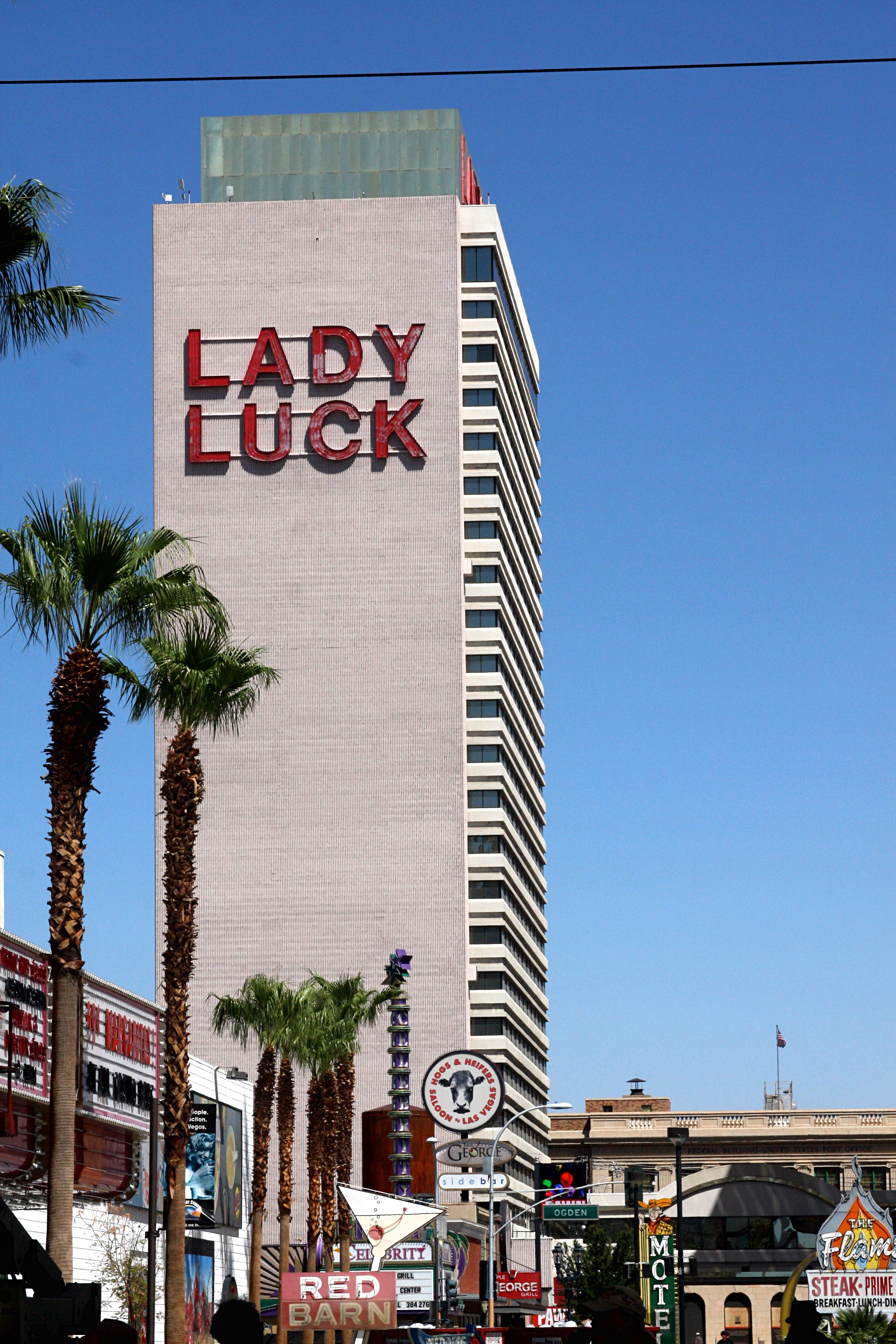
The Lady Luck's west tower in 2009

By 1983, Tompkins had acquired the city block surrounding the Lady Luck casino. The land included the former headquarters for Nevada Power Company, consisting of a two-story and four-story building, both located at the southwest corner of 4th Street and Stewart Avenue. That year, Tompkins converted the buildings into a hotel for the Lady Luck, adding approximately 100 rooms. These would be demolished during the Lady Luck's closure in the late 2000s.

A $16 million expansion began in 1986, and included a 16-story tower with about 300 rooms. A 24-story structure with 400 rooms, located west of the original tower, was constructed from 1988 to 1989, bringing the Lady Luck's total room count to approximately 800.

In 2017, the Downtown Grand intended to build a third tower, standing eight stories with 495 rooms. Construction began in January 2019, along the property's east side. Known as the Gallery Tower, it is named in reference to the Downtown Grand's art collection, which is spread throughout the property. The tower has its own collection of artwork, including various augmented reality pieces. The tower opened on September 22, 2020, bringing the total room count from 629 to 1,124.

The Downtown Grand includes 24,085 sq ft (2,237.6 m^{2}) of gaming space. It opened with approximately 600 slot machines and 30 table games. In a departure from the typical casino design, the Downtown Grand allowed restaurant visitors to bypass the casino floor entirely. The gaming floor was revamped a couple years after opening to attract more gamblers.

=== Restaurants ===
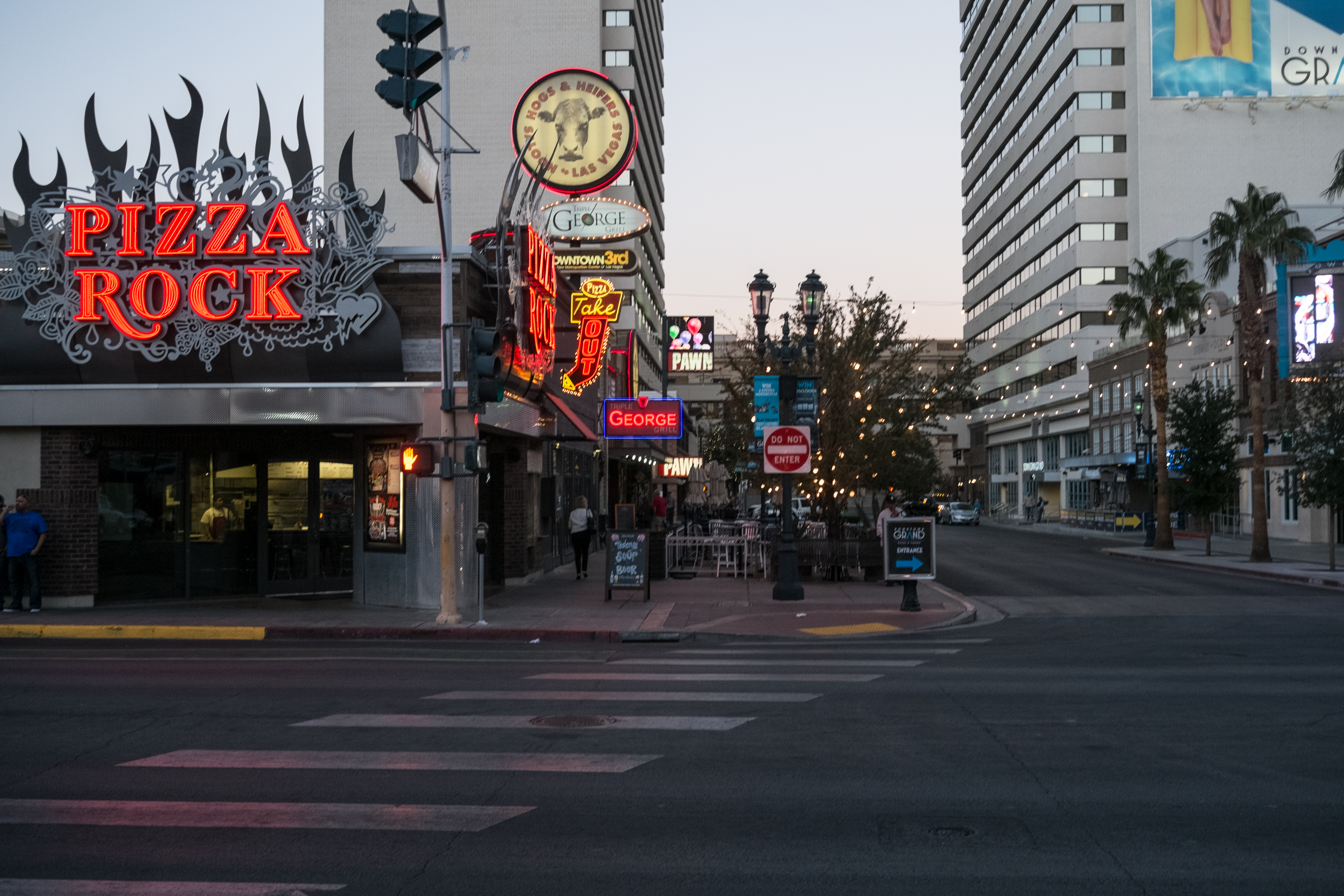
Downtown3rd restaurants in 2015

The Burgundy Room, a fine-dining restaurant, debuted at the Lady Luck in 1986. Several new restaurants were added as part of the 1989 expansion.

In 2004, the Henry Brent Company purchased the former Trolley Stop casino, located adjacent to the Lady Luck at the northwest corner of 3rd Street and Ogden Avenue. The building was converted into a collection of bars and restaurants for Lady Luck visitors. It opened in 2005, and included a Hogs & Heifers bar, the Sidebar, and the Triple George Grill. These businesses were unaffected by the closure of the Lady Luck, and the area would become known as Downtown3rd upon the property's reopening as the Downtown Grand. Most of the restaurant spaces are leased out, with the Triple George Grill among the exceptions.

Freedom Beat, a restaurant and music venue, opened in 2016. At the time, it was the only restaurant located within the casino itself.

=== Pool and entertainment ===
The 1983 hotel addition included a pool, and the Lady Luck offered a regular pool party event known as Polynesian Revue during the 1990s. The property also featured a domed showroom which hosted magicians, including Melinda Saxe and Steve Wyrick. A comedy venue, part of the Comedy Zone franchise, had opened by 2002. The Lady Luck's showroom had closed by the end of 2005. A new 35,000 sq ft (3,300 m^{2}) rooftop pool above the casino was added during the Downtown Grand conversion.
