= Casino Queen Marquette =

Riverboat casino in Iowa, United States

Coordinates: 43.04101°N 91.178437°W

Bally's MARQUETTE
- Interactive map of Bally's MARQUETTE
- Location: Marquette, Iowa; 100 Anti Monopoly
- Opened: December 1994
- Gaming space: 17,514 sq ft (1,600 m^{2})
- Signature attractions: Pink Elephant; Sevens
- Notable restaurants: The Buffet
- Casino type: Riverboat
- Owner: Bally's Corporation
- Previous names: Miss Marquette (2000); Isle of Capri Marquette (2000-2008); Lady Luck (2008-2016)
- Website: casinoqueenmarquette.com

Casino Queen Marquette is a 17,514 square feet (1,627.1 m^{2}) riverboat casino located in Marquette, Iowa (across the Mississippi River from Prairie du Chien, Wisconsin) that is owned and operated by Bally's Corporation. The riverboat, named Miss Marquette, is located by a 31-acre (13 ha) site that also contains an enclosed pavilion, providing dining on the first floor and an entertainment showroom/banquet area on the second floor.

Currently offering 566 slot machines featuring a variety of games and 8 tables games.

== History ==
The Miss Marquette riverboat in Marquette, Iowa was bought from Sodak Gaming in November 1999 for $41.67 million. Shortly after, on October 6, 2000, Isle of Capri agreed to acquire the Miss Marquette riverboat for $47.7 million. The riverboat, Miss Marquette, was acquired from the Isle of Capri Casinos in 2000, and re-branded as the Isle of Capri Marquette. In December 2008 the Miss Marquette riverboat was approaching a Lady Luck re-brand. A few months later, March 2009, the exterior re-branding of the Miss Marquette riverboat was completed. Later in the year, August 2009, the completion of the Lady Luck re-brand was near.

On October 13, 2016 Isle of Capri Casinos, Inc announced the sale of its Lady Luck branded casino property in Marquette, Iowa to Casino Queen, or CQ Holdings Company Inc for an estimated amount of $40 million. After a few months, on March 13, 2017, the Isle of Capri Casinos, Inc completed the announced sell of Lady Luck Casino Marquette property to Casino Queen for an estimated amount of $50 million in redemption of its outstanding debt.

In 2023, The Queen Casino & Entertainment received approval from the Iowa Racing and Gaming Commission to move the casino from the Miss Marquette riverboat to land. Construction will begin during the second half of 2023 to add an additional 12,000 square feet to the existing dockside facility that has the Market Street Buffet on the first floor and the entertainment venue on the second floor. The addition to that dockside facility will include the new 17,000 square foot casino, a new entrance, new dining areas and a sports bar. 400 additional slot machines will be in the new land-based casino, along with two new blackjack tables and other games of chance. Construction on this new addition will be completed in late 2024.

Bally's Corporation merged with The Queen Casino & Entertainment in 2025, becoming the owner of Casino Queen Marquette. In March 2026, the casino rebranded and became Bally's Marquette.
