= Riverboat casino =

Casino on a riverboat in the United States

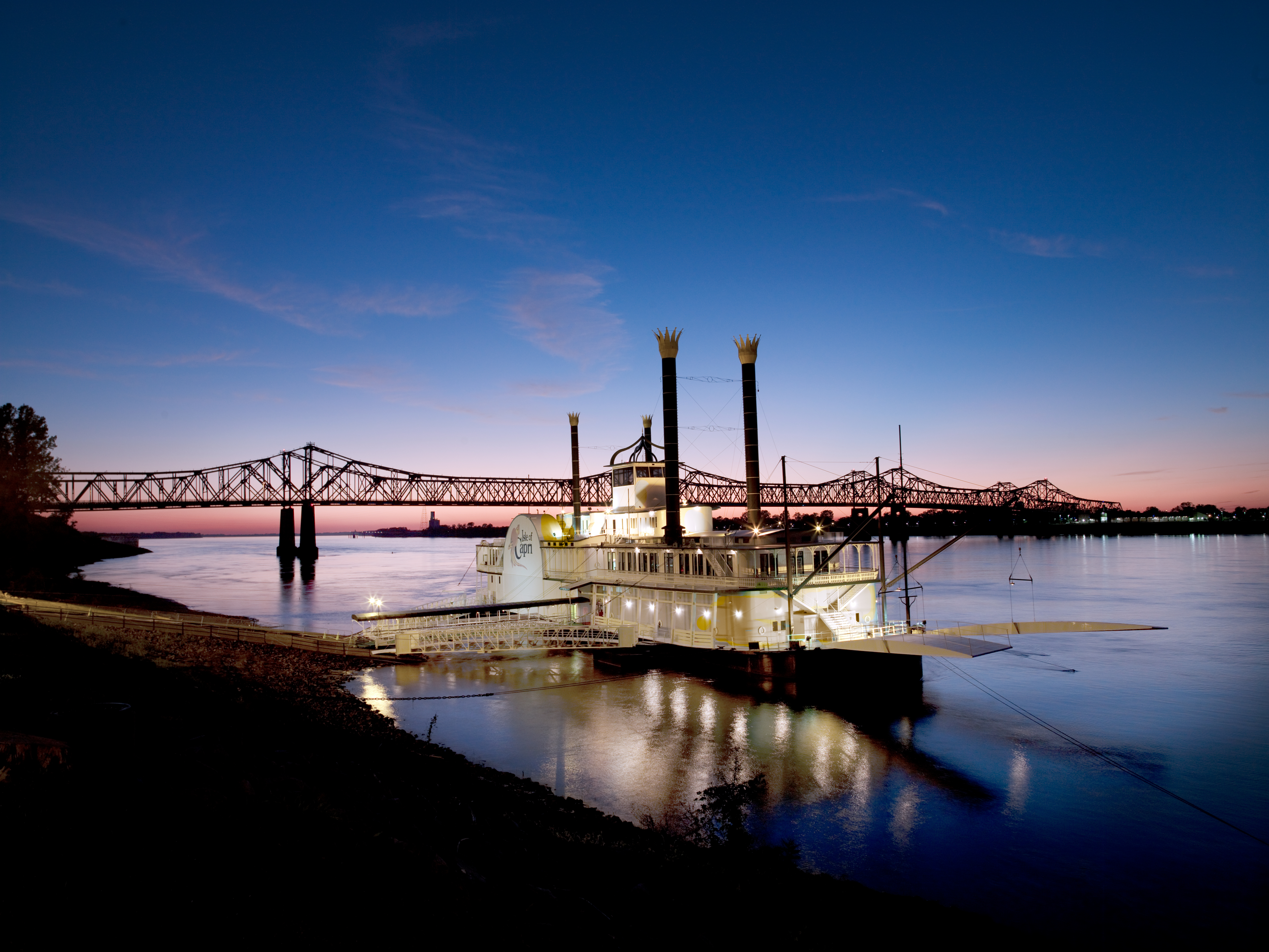
Isle of Capri casino barge on the Mississippi River in Natchez, Mississippi, 2008 (closed 2015)

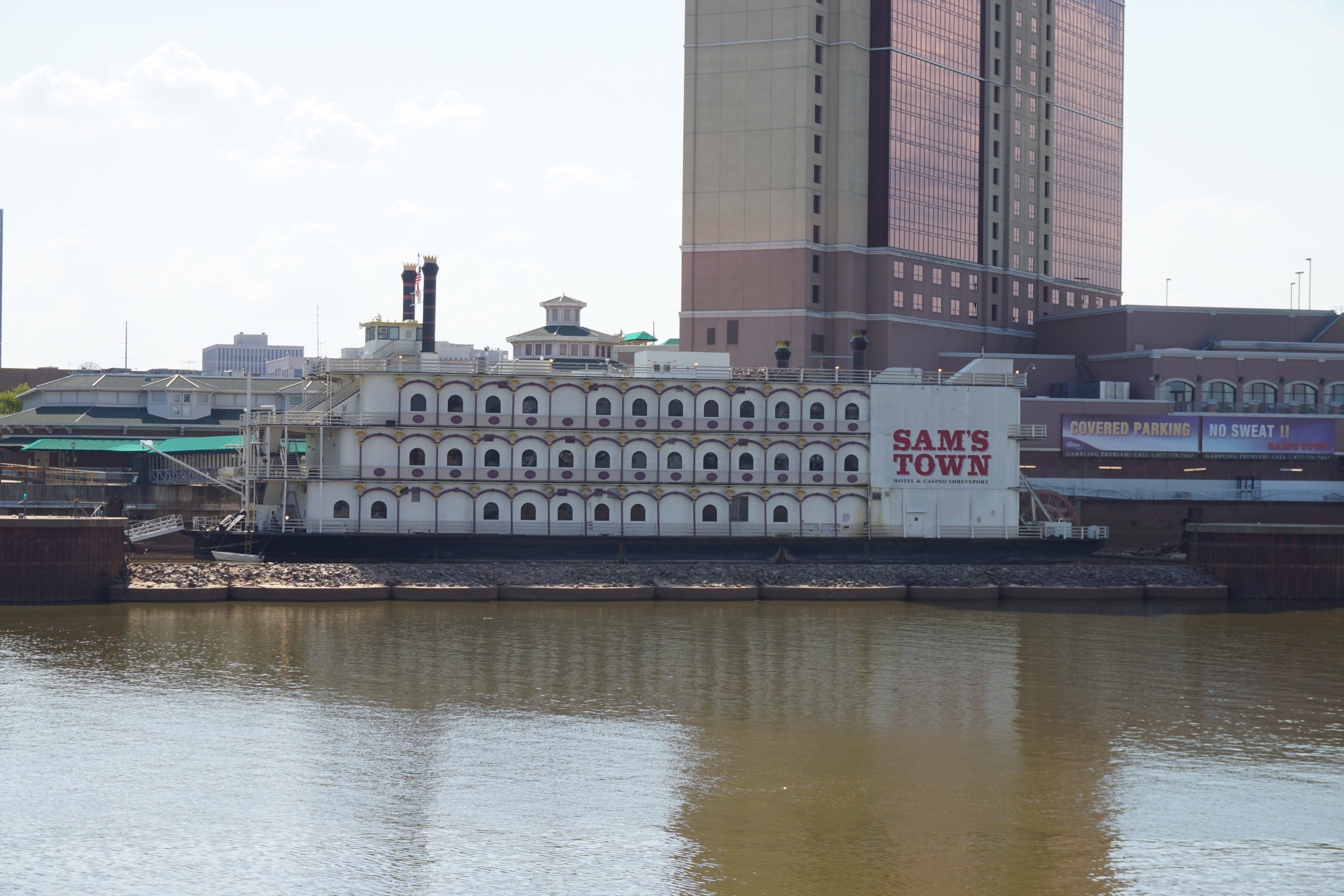
Sam's Town riverboat casino on the Red River, Shreveport, Louisiana

A riverboat casino is a casino which operates on board a riverboat. Such casinos are found in several states in the United States with frontage on the Mississippi River and its tributaries, or along the Gulf Coast. In the 19th century, gambling on riverboats was a common but illegal practice. Several states legalized this type of casino in the early 1990s, in order to enable gambling while limiting the areas where casinos could be constructed. In some cases, the operation of the riverboat is a legal fiction, and the casino is permanently moored.

The legalization of riverboat casinos was in part a response to the federal Indian Gaming Regulatory Act of 1988, which allowed casinos to open on Native American reservations in much of the United States. States with few or no reservations sought to keep the tax revenues associated with gambling from going to states where Native American casinos were opening up.

The use of riverboat casinos has declined in the 21st century, as most states have permitted casinos to operate on land, increasing capacity and improving the safety of gambling structures – particularly after several floating casinos were destroyed by Hurricane Katrina in 2005. As of December 31, 2023, the American Gaming Association reports that there are 64 riverboat casinos operating in six states: Illinois, Indiana, Iowa, Louisiana, Mississippi, and Missouri. Missouri is the only state where all operating casinos are riverboats.

== History ==
Paddlewheel riverboats had long been used on the Mississippi River and its tributaries to transport passengers and freight. After railroads largely superseded them, in the 20th century, they were more frequently used for entertainment excursions, sometimes for several hours, than for passage among riverfront towns. They were often a way for people to escape the heat of the town, as well as to enjoy live music and dancing. Gambling was also common on the riverboats, in card games and via slot machines.

When riverboat casinos were first approved in the late 20th century by the states, which generally prohibited gaming on land, these casinos were required to be located on ships that could sail away from the dock. In some areas, gambling was allowed only when the ship was sailing, as in the traditional excursions. They were approved in states with frontage along the Mississippi and its tributaries, including Illinois, Indiana, Louisiana, Mississippi and Missouri. Illinois also allowed limited riverboat casinos in the Chicago metropolitan area, which has a Mississippi River connection through the Chicago Sanitary and Ship Canal and the Des Plaines River, while Northwest Indiana has three 'riverboat' casinos in harbors along Lake Michigan.

An unusual situation occurred on the Potomac River in the mid-20th century due to a quirk in the state border between Maryland and Virginia. The border is not in the middle of the river, rather it is at the low water mark on the Virginia side such that the entire river is in Maryland, along with the District of Columbia's similar river border. As a result, there were several riverboat casinos docked off of the Virginia shoreline in the 1950s, when gambling was legal in parts of Maryland, but not Virginia. As the river was in Maryland, visitors could park in Virginia, and walk across a pier, crossing the state line in the process. There was no law in Maryland against having casinos on land, but this spared Virginia residents the trouble of having to cross the river, which could involve driving a significant distance out of the way to the nearest bridge.

As an example, in 1994, Missouri voters approved amending the state constitution to allow "games of chance" on the Mississippi and Missouri rivers. By 1998, "according to the state Gaming Commission, just three of the 16 operations comprising Missouri's $652-million riverboat gambling industry [were] clearly on the main river channel." The state supreme court had ruled that boats had to be "solely over and in contact with the surface" of the rivers. Several casinos had been on riverboats located in a moat or an area with water adjacent to a navigable waterway, leading them to be referred to as "boats in moats". The state legislatures were unwilling to give up the revenues generated by gambling. Over time, they allowed gaming casinos to be built on stilts, though with the requirement they had to be over navigable water.

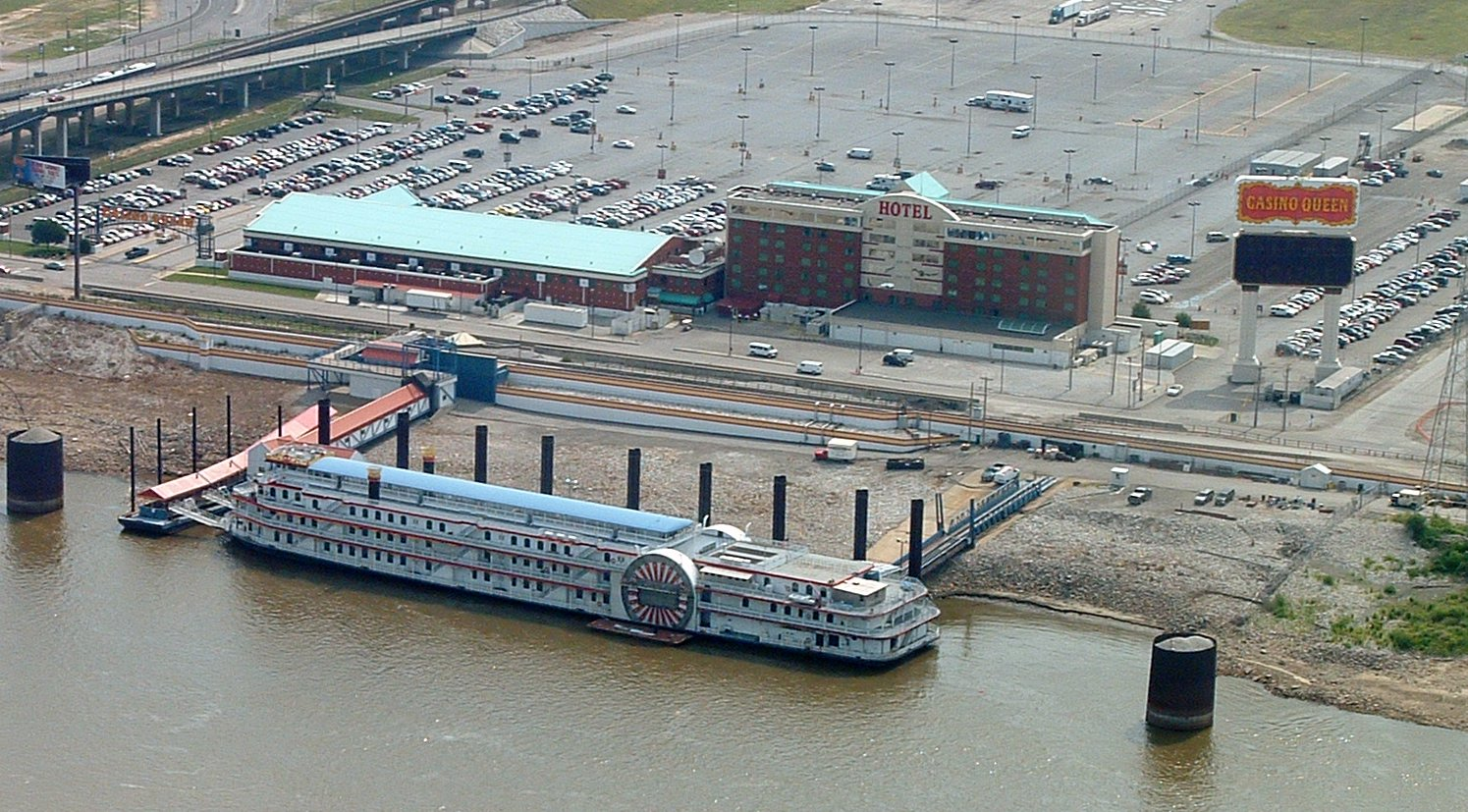
The Casino Queen, a riverboat casino formerly located on the Illinois side of the Mississippi River near St. Louis

Following Hurricane Katrina in 2005, which destroyed most riverboat casinos and their associated facilities of hotels, restaurants, etc., in states along the Gulf Coast, several states changed their enabling legislation or amended constitutions. They permitted such casinos to be built on land within certain geographic limits from a navigable waterway. Most of Mississippi's Gulf Coast riverboat casinos have been rebuilt on beachfronts with solid foundation systems since the hurricane.

== Laws and history by state ==
=== Illinois ===
When Iowa legislators first proposed the legalization of riverboat gambling in the Quad Cities area in 1986, their counterparts in Illinois were concerned about the impact on the Illinois side of the Quad Cities, particularly on the Quad City Downs racetrack in East Moline. State legislators from the Moline area were split: Representative Bob DeJaegher led a push to pre-emptively ban riverboat casinos in Illinois, while Senator Denny Jacobs introduced a bill to legalize them. DeJaegher's proposed ban was passed on the same day in May 1987 that the Iowa House of Representatives voted to legalize the casinos. Neither measure was taken up in that state's senate before the end of their 1987 sessions, and neither state took action in 1988.

After Iowa passed its legislation in April 1989, interest in Jacobs' bill was revived. Because House Speaker Mike Madigan and other Chicago-area leaders opposed the proposal, riverboat casinos were to be limited only to the Quad Cities, Peoria, and Rockford. To gain Republican support for the Democratic bill, Republican governor James R. Thompson suggested adding a provision that would freeze property taxes for the Arlington Park racetrack, still recovering from its 1985 fire. This compromise worked in the Senate, where it passed on June 30, 1989, but failed in the House the same day. Despite efforts to revive the bill in October, it was not taken up in either chamber before the legislative session ended in November.

However, when the next legislative session began in January 1990, the Jacobs bill was quickly brought back. On January 11, it came up for a vote in both chambers. In the House, the Riverboat Gambling Act passed by one vote, after Richard Mautino changed his vote mid-tally. The bill passed the Senate nine minutes later by two votes. Governor Thompson signed the bill on February 7, thanking the legislature "for helping me beat Iowa" (since Illinois' law would go into effect three months earlier than Iowa's).

The law established the Illinois Gaming Board. It allowed riverboat casino operations on the Mississippi River, and on the Illinois River south of Marshall County, to begin January 1, 1991, and on all other navigable waters of the state except Lake Michigan and any part of Cook County on March 1, 1992. The Board was empowered to issue five licenses in 1991, four on the Mississippi and one on the Illinois, and another five in 1992. Gambling would not be allowed while the boats were docked. Legislators had promised to set a maximum loss per person per casino visit of $500, but this provision was left out of the law as passed. This was initially said to be a mistake that would be fixed by the passage of a "cleanup bill", but the fix was never passed.

While riverboat gambling was technically legal in Illinois before Iowa, no casinos were licensed in Illinois before Iowa's opened on April 1, 1991. The first riverboat casino in Illinois, the Alton Belle, began operating on September 10, 1991. The Illinois Gaming Act of 1999 modified the law to allow gambling to take place on permanently moored barges, responding to previous similar changes in Iowa.

Beginning in 2009, Illinois has allowed bars and taverns to operate Video Gaming Terminals, low-stakes slot machines, in thousands of locations across the state. This led to a reduction in revenue at the state's riverboat casinos. Subsequently, the state passed gaming expansion legislation in 2019, allowing casinos to operate on land for the first time and expanding the total number of statewide casino licenses from 10 (where it had been since 1992) to 16. As of December 31, 2024, six casinos in Illinois still operate as riverboats or moored barges although it is no longer required.

=== Indiana ===
Riverboat gambling was legalized in Indiana in 1993, with a maximum of 11 casino permits to be made available by the state: five on Lake Michigan, five along the Ohio River, and one in Patoka Lake. The first riverboat casino in Indiana was the Casino Aztar Evansville, which opened in 1995. In 2015, the legislature amended the casino law to allow the state's riverboat casinos to move into land-based facilities on their existing sites, to help them remain competitive with casinos in neighboring states. As of December 31, 2024, six casinos in Indiana still operate as riverboats or moored barges, while another five casinos have relocated to land-based structures.

=== Iowa ===
Iowa was the first state to move to legalize modern riverboat casinos, passing a bill to do so in 1989. This was in part a response to the passage of the federal Indian Gaming Regulatory Act of 1988, which allowed casinos to open on Native American reservations in neighboring Minnesota and Wisconsin. Since Iowans would be traveling to new nearby casinos to gamble no matter what the state did, legalizing riverboat casinos would keep the associated tax revenues in the state, bolster the depressed economies of the cities where the boats docked, and revive a mythologized part of the region's past.

In January 1986, three state representatives from the Quad Cities area, along the Mississippi River, proposed a commission that would study the benefits and drawbacks of legalizing riverboat casinos. While their proposal was intended only to affect their immediate area, the proposal soon expanded to allow casinos on the Missouri River and several inland lakes throughout the state. The study committee approved the measure 6–4 in December 1986. The bill narrowly passed the House in May 1987, by a vote of 52–47, despite attempts by the Republican minority to block it. The Senate declined to consider the bill in 1987 and voted it down in 1988.

In its next session, the Senate rejected the bill again on March 1, 1989, by a vote of 28–22. However, opposing Senator George Kinley indicated that he would be willing to change his vote if the bill was amended to delay the beginning of legal gambling until 1991. When the amended bill was reconsidered on March 7, Kinley and two other senators switched to supporting the bill, causing it to pass 26–23. The bill returned to the House, where it was voted down 47–53 on April 11. However, again three members changed their minds, and the bill passed 51–47 on April 20. Governor Terry Branstad signed the bill into law on April 27.

Responsibility for regulating riverboat casinos was given to the Iowa Racing and Gaming Commission, which had been created in 1984 with the legalization of racetrack betting in the state. As initially written, the law stipulated that "games of chance" could only take place on a "self-propelled excursion boat", while the boat was cruising on the water, during the "excursion season" from April 1 to October 31, unless weather or other conditions prevented it. Casinos that followed these requirements during the season would be allowed to continue operating gambling games during the winter, while the boat remained docked. To maintain the quaint atmosphere of the riverboat, casinos were required to, "as nearly as practicable, recreate boats that resemble Iowa's riverboat history", and each individual patron would be limited to a maximum wager of $5 per play and a maximum loss of $200 per visit. Other requirements were that no more than 30 percent of the boat's floor area could be used for gambling; that each boat must have a separate, supervised area for children who would not be permitted to gamble; and that a portion of the boat be "reserved for promotion and sale of arts, crafts, and gifts native to and made in Iowa." Casinos were permitted to operate on any inland waters, not just the Mississippi, but only if the county of operation approved it by referendum.

When the law took effect on April 1, 1991, three riverboat casinos were ready to begin operating on that date, becoming the first of their kind in the nation: the Diamond Lady in Bettendorf, the President in Davenport, and the Casino Belle in Dubuque. In the years that followed, neighboring Illinois and Missouri also legalized riverboat casinos with looser regulations, attracting business away from Iowa's riverboats. In response, the Iowa Legislature removed some of its previous restrictions in March 1994, allowing casinos to operate while docked, eliminating the maximum wager and loss limits, and permitting more than 30 percent of floor space to be devoted to gambling.

The law was amended again in May 2004 to remove the requirement that riverboat casinos must be self-propelled boats, allowing gambling to take place on permanently moored barges. This change benefited the Isle of Capri Casino in Waterloo, then under construction, which had been planning to construct a moat that its riverboat could circle around in. After the law was passed, the Isle of Capri Casino was built as a moored barge instead.

In May 2007, the construction of land-based casino buildings was legalized, removing the incentive for casinos to operate on boats. Riverboat casinos have since almost completely disappeared in Iowa. The last remaining excursion boat casino in the state was the Casino Queen Marquette, which was replaced with a building on land in March 2026. The Ameristar Casino Council Bluffs plans to leave its permanently docked boat for a land-based building, which will leave the Lakeside Hotel & Casino's moored barge in Osceola as the only remaining riverboat casino in Iowa.

=== Louisiana ===
The Louisiana Riverboat Economic Development and Gaming Control Act of 1991 allowed a maximum of 15 riverboat casinos to be licensed to operate in eight bodies of water: the Atchafalaya, Calcasieu, Mermentau, Mississippi, Ouachita, and Red Rivers, and Lakes Maurepas and Ponchartrain. Only paddlewheel steamers built in the style of historic 19th-century riverboats were eligible for gambling licenses, and they were required to have been built after January 1, 1991, preventing existing Mississippi riverboats from converting into casinos. Ships were also limited to a maximum capacity of 600 passengers. The act was signed into law by Governor Buddy Roemer on July 18, 1991.

The first riverboat casino in Louisiana, the Showboat Star Casino on Lake Ponchartrain, opened on November 8, 1993, although gambling was allowed to take place during a black-tie gala before the opening on October 28. Under state law, gambling could only occur while a boat was cruising on the water, but this requirement could be waived if there were safety concerns temporarily preventing the boat from leaving the dock. By November 1994, eight of the state's nine casinos were not leaving their docks at all, and some of the safety issues they claimed made it necessary to do so were challenged legally. The cruising requirement was removed in 2001, allowing casinos to be permanently docked. However, boats were still required to keep their paddlewheels spinning even if they were otherwise motionless.

Initially, there was only one exception to Louisiana's requirement that all casinos must be on riverboats. State law was amended in 1992 to allow the construction of one land-based casino in downtown New Orleans. The license to operate this casino was awarded to the Harrah's Jazz project in 1993, but this joint venture was canceled in 1995, and the casino did not ultimately open as Harrah's New Orleans until 1999. Racinos were legalized in Louisiana in 1997, adding competition for the state's riverboats.

In 2018, Louisiana law was modified to allow riverboat casinos to move into land-based buildings a maximum of 1,200 feet from their previous locations. As of May 2026, four riverboat casinos have moved onto land, while 10 continue to operate on riverboats.

=== Mississippi ===
Before riverboat gambling was legalized in Mississippi, the state had one gambling ship: the Europa Star, which briefly operated out of Point Cadet Marina in Biloxi, sailing into the Mississippi Sound and out past the three-mile limit where it was thought that the state government had no jurisdiction. The Europa Star operated in Biloxi from December 1987 to November 1988, shortly after a judge ruled that the state's laws against gambling in fact did apply to the Sound, forcing the ship to take longer trips out past the barrier islands and into the international waters in the Gulf of Mexico. While the court case was pending, state representative Glenn Endris introduced a bill to legalize gambling in the Sound. This measure passed the Mississippi House of Representatives in February 1988, but failed in the Senate Finance Committee in March.

After the Europa Star left, the Pride of Mississippi came to Gulfport, offering similar gambling excursions to the Gulf beginning in February 1989. The proposal to legalize gambling in the Sound came up again shortly thereafter. As a compromise, it was agreed that gambling could take place on cruise ships in the Sound when they were more than 1,500 feet from shore, but only as part of voyages that traveled past the barrier islands and into the Gulf. It was also limited to ships longer than 300 feet. The bill was signed into law by Governor Ray Mabus on March 28, 1989, and gambling in the Sound on the Pride began later that day.

The Pride of Mississippi left Gulfport for Galveston, Texas, in November 1989. In its place, two 250-foot gambling ships began operating in December 1989 and March 1990: the LA Cruise out of Biloxi and the Southern Elegance from Gulfport. These ships could not offer gambling in the Sound, only in international waters, because they fell below the 300-foot minimum length to do so. These developments, combined with the news of Iowa's legalization of riverboat casinos in April 1989, and the possibility that Louisiana might take tax revenues from Mississippi by doing the same, provoked the Mississippi state legislature to consider a broader legalization of riverboat gambling statewide.

A bill to legalize riverboat gambling on the Mississippi River was introduced in January 1990 by state senator Bob Dearing. The bill was considered extremely unlikely to pass, given the state's conservative politics and the recent failure of a proposal to create the Mississippi State Lottery. However, leaders of conservative activist groups, such as the Mississippi Baptist Convention Board Christian Action Commission, later admitted that they had failed to take notice of the bill when it was proposed and made no effort to mobilize against it.

The bill narrowly passed the Senate on February 2 by a vote of 23–21. The Senate version of the bill had stipulated that gambling could only take place while boats were cruising in the river, but in the House, it was quietly rewritten to allow gambling while boats were docked, as long as they remained in "navigable waters". This was done at the urging of Rep. Sonny Merideth, who pointed out that cruising in the crowded riverway without ever entering Arkansas or Louisiana would be impossible. The House approved the bill 66–52 on March 7, and the House amendments were approved by the Senate on March 14, with some senators later admitting they were not aware that the House had modified the bill to allow dockside gambling. Governor Mabus signed the bill into law on March 20. Columnist Bill Minor wrote that it was the most surprising development in state politics since Mississippi legalized liquor in 1966.

Under the 1990 law, riverboats could operate casinos if they were at least 150 feet long, capable of carrying a minimum of 200 passengers, and had a draft of at least 6 feet. Casinos would be taxed $3.50 per passenger and 6.25 percent of all winnings over $134,000 in each month. Unlike Illinois, Mississippi set no limits on the number of casinos that could receive licenses, and unlike in Iowa, there was no maximum betting limit for gamblers. The law took effect on April 1, 1990, one year before Iowa's and eight months before Illinois', making Mississippi technically the first state where riverboat gambling was legal. However, no riverboat casinos were ready to begin operation at that time.

Separately, the three counties with frontage on the Mississippi Gulf Coast were each allowed to hold a referendum on December 4, 1990, on whether to allow dockside gambling. Hancock County, which had no gambling ships operating at the time, was the only one of the three to legalize gambling at the dock. Harrison County, out of which both the LA Cruise and the Southern Elegance operated, narrowly rejected dockside gambling, but then legalized it in a second referendum held on March 10, 1992. The county's two existing gambling ships were not automatically awarded licenses for dockside gambling, however, and the first casino ship in Mississippi to offer gambling at the dock was the Isle of Capri Casino Hotel Biloxi, which opened on August 1, 1992.

The first riverboat casino along the Mississippi River in the state was the Casino Splash at Mhoon Landing in Tunica County, which opened on October 19, 1992. By the end of 1994, the state had 21 riverboat casinos along the Mississippi River and 14 docked along the Gulf Coast. Some of these early casinos closed or consolidated while others expanded, the total number of casinos falling from 35 to 29 by April 1996, although overall revenues continued to grow. As of 1996, Mississippi had the largest riverboat-based gambling market in the nation, and was looking to surpass New Jersey to become the second-largest gambling jurisdiction behind Nevada.

On August 29, 2005, Hurricane Katrina destroyed or severely damaged at least nine of the 13 casinos moored along the Mississippi Gulf Coast. In the aftermath, it was suggested that state law should be modified to allow gambling on land, so that the casinos could be rebuilt as sturdier structures capable of weathering future storms. When the Mississippi legislature convened for a special session responding to the damage caused by Katrina, it amended the law in October 2005 to allow gambling to take place on land up to 800 feet from the Gulf Coast shoreline and, in Harrison County only, any place south of U.S. Route 90. As of December 31, 2023, Mississippi has 20 riverboat casinos and six land-based casinos along the Gulf Coast.

=== Missouri ===
Riverboat gambling in Missouri was enabled by the November 1992 passage of Proposition A, which established the Missouri Gaming Commission to regulate riverboat casinos. Much of the proposition's text was identical to that of Iowa's Excursion Boat Gambling Act. Casinos were only permitted on the Mississippi and Missouri rivers. Boats were required to leave the dock (when conditions permitted) before gambling could occur onboard, although the law specifically exempted the SS Admiral from this requirement. Riverboat casinos were also only allowed to dock in cities or counties where they had been approved by voters in a local referendum, and several such local option votes passed during the same election as Proposition A.

The Missouri General Assembly modified the text of the proposition before putting it into law in 1994. On the advice of Coast Guard officials concerned about navigation safety, the requirement that casinos must cruise on the river was removed. Instead, it was left to the Gaming Commission to decide, in the case of each riverboat, whether "the best interest of Missouri and the safety of the public indicate the need for continuous docking of the excursion gambling boat in any city or county." An unsuccessful effort to block the legalization was led by state representative and future U.S. congressman Todd Akin.

The first two riverboat casinos in Missouri, the President Casino Laclede's Landing on the Admiral in St. Louis and the Station Casino St. Charles, both opened on May 27, 1994.

The Schools First Elementary and Secondary Education Funding Initiative, a referendum passed in November 2008, forbade the issuing of any new licenses for casinos in Missouri, capping the total number of gaming riverboats at 13. It also removed the stipulation that patrons could lose no more than $500 per excursion, making Missouri the last state with legal gambling to remove its loss limit.

In 2021, Senate Bill 26 expanded the definition of an excursion gambling boat to include any "nonfloating facility" structure located within 1,000 feet of the Mississippi or Missouri rivers, so long as there is "at least two thousand gallons of water beneath or inside the facility". As of December 31, 2024, the American Gaming Association continues to classify all casinos in the state as riverboats and none as land-based.
