= Marquette, Iowa =

- City
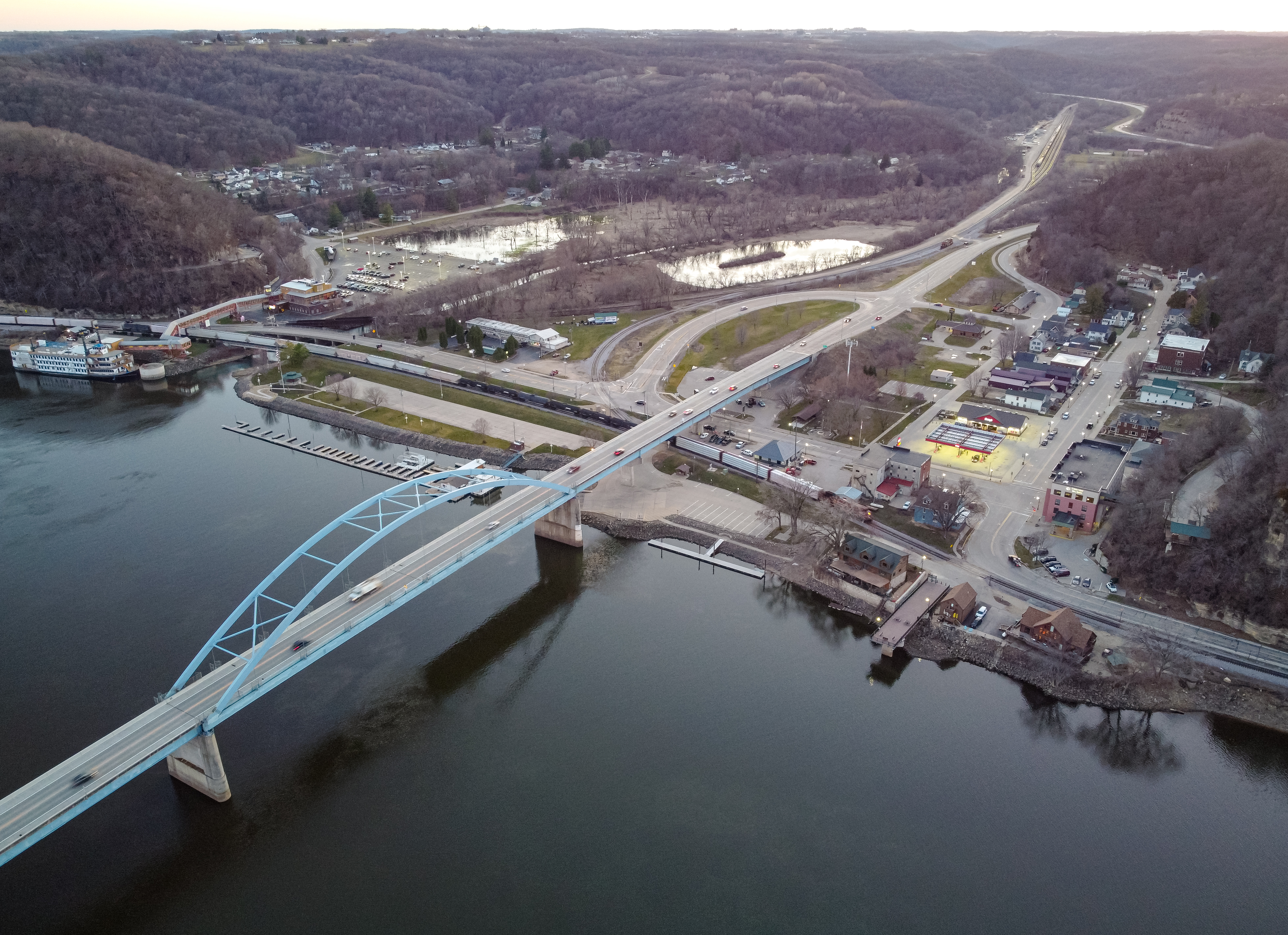
- US-18 is carried by Marquette–Joliet Bridge into Marquette, Iowa

- Location of Marquette, Iowa
- Coordinates: 43°02′39″N 91°11′31″W
- Country: United States
- State: Iowa
- County: Clayton

Area
  - Total: 1.92 sq mi (4.98 km^{2})
  - Land: 1.86 sq mi (4.81 km^{2})
  - Water: 0.066 sq mi (0.17 km^{2})
- Elevation: 637 ft (194 m)

Population (2020)
  - Total: 429
  - Density: 231.1/sq mi (89.24/km^{2})
- Time zone: UTC-6 (Central (CST))
  - Summer (DST): UTC-5 (CDT)
- ZIP code: 52158
- Area code: 563
- FIPS code: 19-49620
- GNIS feature ID: 2395017
- Website: www.marquetteiowa.city

Marquette is a city in Clayton County, Iowa, United States. The population was 429 at the time of the 2020 census, up from 421 in 2000. The city, which is located on the Mississippi River, is named after Jesuit missionary Jacques Marquette, who along with Louis Joliet discovered the Mississippi River just southeast of the city on June 17, 1673.

== History ==
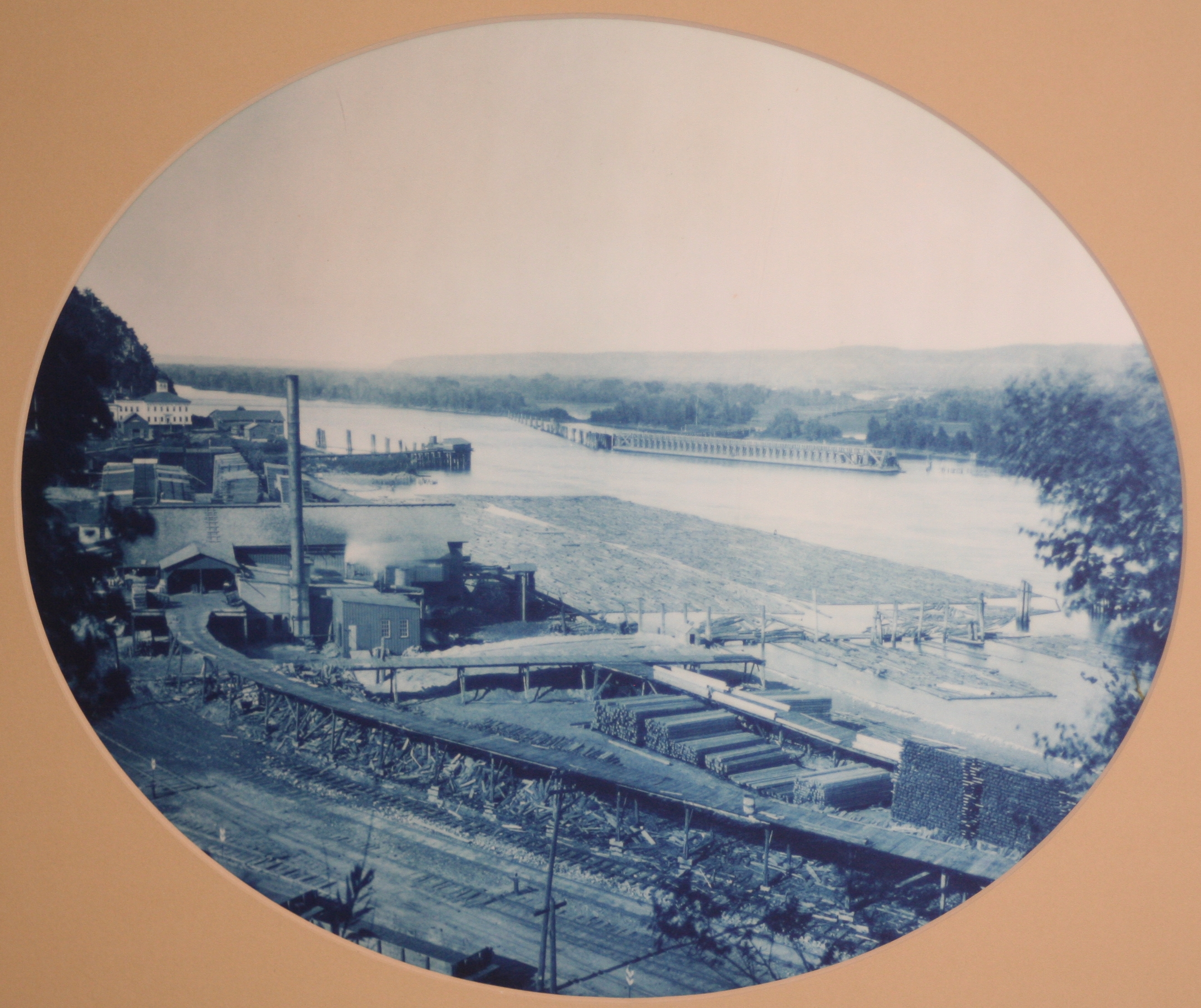
Pontoon bridge near Marquette, 1885

Marquette is located directly across from Prairie du Chien, Wisconsin, and the two cities are connected by U.S. Route 18, which crosses the river on the Marquette-Joliet Bridge. Effigy Mounds National Monument and the Yellow River State Forest are a few miles to the north. The city of McGregor is located just to the south. Marquette itself was originally incorporated as North McGregor in 1874, and it served as a railroad terminus for its southern neighbor.

Along with McGregor, the city became a major hub on the railroad, as grain from throughout Iowa and Minnesota was sent through the city en route to Lake Michigan. Initially trains had to be ferried across the river between Marquette and Prairie du Chien, Wisconsin, in order to continue their journey, but this system came to an end when Prairie du Chien businessman John Lawler had a permanent pontoon bridge built to connect the two cities' rail lines. Marquette subsequently became home to a major rail yard, which even as late as 1920 was the busiest in Iowa, employing 400 people. Not too long afterwards, the railroad's significance declined, the last passenger train stopped in Marquette in 1960, and the pontoon bridge was disassembled in 1961. Today the city is a tourist destination along the mighty Mississippi River.

== Geography ==
According to the United States Census Bureau, the city has a total area of 1.81 square miles (4.69 km^{2}), of which 1.74 square miles (4.51 km^{2}) is land and 0.07 square miles (0.18 km^{2}) is water.

== Demographics ==
Historical populations
Year	Pop.	±%
1880	519	—
1890	509	−1.9%
1900	616	+21.0%
1910	588	−4.5%
1920	923	+57.0%
1930	814	−11.8%
1940	747	−8.2%
1950	641	−14.2%
1960	572	−10.8%
1970	509	−11.0%
1980	528	+3.7%
1990	479	−9.3%
2000	421	−12.1%
2010	375	−10.9%
2020	429	+14.4%
Source:"U.S. Census website". United States Census Bureau. and Iowa Data Center; Source: U.S. Decennial Census

=== 2020 census ===
As of the census of 2020, there were 429 people, 208 households, and 110 families residing in the city. The population density was 231.1 inhabitants per square mile (89.2/km^{2}). There were 255 housing units at an average density of 137.4 per square mile (53.0/km^{2}). The racial makeup of the city was 95.1% White, 0.5% Black or African American, 0.5% Native American, 0.0% Asian, 0.0% Pacific Islander, 0.2% from other races and 3.7% from two or more races. Hispanic or Latino persons of any race comprised 0.5% of the population.

Of the 208 households, 22.1% of which had children under the age of 18 living with them, 42.8% were married couples living together, 7.7% were cohabitating couples, 24.0% had a female householder with no spouse or partner present and 25.5% had a male householder with no spouse or partner present. 47.1% of all households were non-families. 42.3% of all households were made up of individuals, 17.8% had someone living alone who was 65 years old or older.

The median age in the city was 45.6 years. 20.3% of the residents were under the age of 20; 6.1% were between the ages of 20 and 24; 22.6% were from 25 and 44; 29.6% were from 45 and 64; and 21.4% were 65 years of age or older. The gender makeup of the city was 51.7% male and 48.3% female.

=== 2010 census ===
As of the census of 2010, there were 375 people, 182 households, and 104 families living in the city. The population density was 215.5 inhabitants per square mile (83.2/km^{2}). There were 216 housing units at an average density of 124.1 per square mile (47.9/km^{2}). The racial makeup of the city was 98.7% White, 0.8% Native American, 0.3% Asian, and 0.3% from two or more races. Hispanic or Latino of any race were 0.5% of the population.

There were 182 households, of which 24.2% had children under the age of 18 living with them, 45.1% were married couples living together, 6.6% had a female householder with no husband present, 5.5% had a male householder with no wife present, and 42.9% were non-families. 35.2% of all households were made up of individuals, and 13.7% had someone living alone who was 65 years of age or older. The average household size was 2.06 and the average family size was 2.60.

The median age in the city was 46.6 years. 19.2% of residents were under the age of 18; 6% were between the ages of 18 and 24; 23.7% were from 25 to 44; 30.2% were from 45 to 64; and 20.8% were 65 years of age or older. The gender makeup of the city was 49.9% male and 50.1% female.

=== 2000 census ===
As of the census of 2000, there were 421 people, 194 households, and 108 families living in the city. The population density was 345.2 inhabitants per square mile (133.3/km^{2}). There were 222 housing units at an average density of 182.0 per square mile (70.3/km^{2}). The racial makeup of the city was 98.57% White, 0.48% African American and 0.95% Native American. Hispanic or Latino of any race were 0.71% of the population.

There were 194 households, out of which 24.2% had children under the age of 18 living with them, 42.3% were married couples living together, 8.8% had a female householder with no husband present, and 44.3% were non-families. 37.6% of all households were made up of individuals, and 12.9% had someone living alone who was 65 years of age or older. The average household size was 2.17 and the average family size was 2.91.

Age spread: 22.3% under the age of 18, 9.0% from 18 to 24, 28.7% from 25 to 44, 26.8% from 45 to 64, and 13.1% who were 65 years of age or older. The median age was 39 years. For every 100 females, there were 91.4 males. For every 100 females age 18 and over, there were 97.0 males.

== Education ==
It is within the MFL MarMac Community School District. The district formed on July 1, 1994, with the merger of the Mar-Mac and M-F-L districts.
