= 2023–24 NHL season =

National Hockey League season

- League: National Hockey League
- Sport: Ice hockey
- Duration: October 10, 2023 – June 24, 2024
- Games: 82
- Teams: 32
- TV partner(s): Sportsnet/SN1/SN360, Citytv, CBC, TVA Sports (Canada); ESPN/ABC/ESPN2, TNT/TBS (United States)
- Streaming partner(s): Sportsnet+ (Canada); ESPN+/Hulu, Max (United States)

Draft
- Top draft pick: Connor Bedard
- Picked by: Chicago Blackhawks

Regular season
- Presidents' Trophy: New York Rangers
- Season MVP: Nathan MacKinnon (Avalanche)
- Top scorer: Nikita Kucherov (Lightning)

Playoffs
- Playoffs MVP: Connor McDavid (Oilers)

Stanley Cup
- Champions: Florida Panthers
- Runners-up: Edmonton Oilers

NHL seasons
- 2022–23 2024–25

The 2023–24 NHL season was the 107th season of operation (106th season of play) of the National Hockey League (NHL). The regular season began on October 10, 2023, and ended on April 18, 2024. The 2024 Stanley Cup playoffs began on April 20. The Stanley Cup Final began on June 8, and ended on June 24, 2024, with the Florida Panthers defeating the Edmonton Oilers in seven games, winning their first Stanley Cup in franchise history.

This was the final season for the Arizona Coyotes before they suspended operations. It followed the sale of the team's hockey assets to Utah businessman Ryan Smith, who was awarded an expansion team in Salt Lake City to begin play in the 2024–25 season. The Coyotes had until 2029 to construct a new arena, upon which they would have been reactivated as an expansion team with all previous team history, records, and uniforms being maintained. However, in June, the auction was canceled, and Alex Meruelo left the ownership, leading the team to cease operations. The Coyotes became the first team to suspend operations since the Brooklyn Americans in 1942.

== League business ==
=== Entry draft ===
The 2023 NHL entry draft was held on June 28–29, 2023, at Bridgestone Arena in Nashville, Tennessee. Connor Bedard was selected first overall by the Chicago Blackhawks.

=== Preseason games in Australia ===
The NHL held games in Australia for the first time in league history. The Arizona Coyotes and Los Angeles Kings played on September 23 and 24 at Rod Laver Arena in Melbourne, best known as the main venue for the Australian Open. Since the arena was not designed for ice hockey, the league built a temporary rink akin to other NHL outdoor games, though the arena's retractable roof was closed for the games.

=== Sponsorships ===
In November 2023, Penn Entertainment announced an agreement to become an official sports betting partner of the NHL in Canada and the United States; the agreement is represented in Canada via theScore Bet, and in the United States via the then-recently launched ESPN Bet.

== Coaching changes ==
Coaching changes
Off–season
| Team | 2022–23 coach | 2023–24 coach | Notes |
|---|---|---|---|
| Anaheim Ducks | Dallas Eakins | Greg Cronin | On April 14, 2023, one day after the conclusion of the Ducks' season, the team announced that Eakins' contract would not be renewed. In four seasons with Anaheim, Eakins totaled a 100–147–44 record, with no playoff appearances. Cronin, most recently the head coach of the Colorado Avalanche's American Hockey League (AHL) affiliate, the Colorado Eagles, was named head coach on June 5, 2023. |
| Calgary Flames | Darryl Sutter | Ryan Huska | Sutter was fired on May 1, 2023, two and a half weeks after the conclusion of the Flames' season. In just under three seasons during his second stint as the Flames' head coach, Sutter posted a 103–63–28 record, winning the Jack Adams Award in 2021–22 and reaching the playoffs as Pacific Division champions the same year; the team ultimately lost in the second round. Huska, an assistant coach for Calgary since 2018, was promoted to head coach on June 12, 2023. |
| Columbus Blue Jackets | Brad Larsen | Mike Babcock (resigned); Pascal Vincent | Larsen was fired on April 15, 2023, one day after the conclusion of the Blue Jackets' season. In two seasons with Columbus, Larsen posted a 62–86–16 record, with no playoff appearances. Babcock, most recently head coach of the Toronto Maple Leafs from 2015 to 2019, was named head coach on July 1, 2023. However, after allegations of improper behavior via the Spittin' Chiclets podcast led to an NHLPA investigation into Babcock, he announced his resignation as head coach on September 17, before the start of the preseason. Associate coach Pascal Vincent was subsequently promoted to head coach, signing a two-year contract. |
| Nashville Predators | John Hynes | Andrew Brunette | Hynes was fired on May 30, 2023, a month and a half after the conclusion of the Predators' season. In three and a half seasons with Nashville, Hynes registered a 134–96–18 record, reaching the playoffs three times, but failing to advance past the first round. Brunette, most recently an assistant coach with the New Jersey Devils, and previously interim head coach of the Florida Panthers during the 2021–22 season, was named head coach the following day. |
| New York Rangers | Gerard Gallant | Peter Laviolette | Gallant and the Rangers mutually agreed to part ways on May 6, 2023, five days after the Rangers' elimination from the 2023 playoffs. In two seasons with New York, Gallant led the team to a 99–46–19 record with two playoff appearances, reaching the Eastern Conference finals in 2022. Laviolette, most recently head coach of the Washington Capitals from 2020 to 2023, and who had left Washington two months prior, was named head coach on June 13, 2023. |
| Washington Capitals | Peter Laviolette | Spencer Carbery | On April 14, 2023, one day after the conclusion of the Capitals' season, in which they missed the playoffs for the first time since 2014, and with his contract expiring, the team and Laviolette mutually agreed to part ways. Laviolette posted a 115–78–27 record in three seasons with Washington, reaching the playoffs twice but failing to advance past the first round. Carbery, most recently an assistant coach with the Toronto Maple Leafs, and formerly head coach of Washington's minor league affiliates, the ECHL's South Carolina Stingrays and AHL's Hershey Bears, was named head coach on May 30, 2023. |
In–season
| Team | Outgoing coach | Incoming coach | Notes |
| Edmonton Oilers | Jay Woodcroft | Kris Knoblauch | Woodcroft was fired on November 12, 2023, after the Oilers started the season 3–9–1. In parts of three seasons with the Oilers, Woodcroft totaled a 79–41–13 record and made the playoffs twice, including reaching the Western Conference finals in 2022. Knoblauch, formerly the head coach of the New York Rangers' AHL affiliate, the Hartford Wolf Pack, was named head coach the same day. |
| Los Angeles Kings | Todd McLellan | Jim Hiller* | McLellan was fired on February 2, 2024, with the Kings holding a record of 23–15–10; despite a 20–7–4 start to the season, the team went 3–8–6 in the 17 games preceding his dismissal. In four and a half seasons with Los Angeles, McLellan posted a 164–130–44 record, reaching the playoffs twice but failing to advance past the first round. Hiller, an assistant coach, was promoted to interim head coach. |
| Minnesota Wild | Dean Evason | John Hynes | Evason was fired on November 27, 2023, after the Wild started the season 5–10–4. In parts of five seasons with Minnesota, Evason posted a 147–77–27 record, reaching the playoffs four times but failing to advance past the first round. Hynes, most recently head coach of the Nashville Predators from 2020 to 2023, was named head coach the same day. |
| New Jersey Devils | Lindy Ruff | Travis Green* | Ruff was fired on March 4, 2024, after the Devils started 30–27–4. In just over three-and-a-half seasons with New Jersey, Ruff totaled a 128–125–28 record, with one playoff appearance. Green, the associate coach, and previously head coach of the Vancouver Canucks from 2017 to 2021, was promoted to interim head coach the same day. |
| New York Islanders | Lane Lambert | Patrick Roy | Lambert was fired on January 20, 2024, after the Islanders started the season 19–15–11. In a season and a half with New York, Lambert recorded a 61–46–20 record, making the playoffs in his only full year. Roy, most recently head coach of the Quebec Remparts of the Quebec Major Junior Hockey League (QMJHL) from 2018 to 2023, and previously head coach of the Colorado Avalanche from 2013 to 2016, was named head coach the same day. |
| Ottawa Senators | D. J. Smith | Jacques Martin* | Smith was fired on December 18, 2023, after the Senators started the season 11–15–0. In just over four seasons with Ottawa, Smith compiled a 131–154–32 record, with no playoff appearances. Martin, a senior advisor to the coaching staff who previously served as the team's head coach from 1996 to 2004, and most recently served as head coach of the Montreal Canadiens from 2009 to 2011, was promoted to interim head coach. |
| St. Louis Blues | Craig Berube | Drew Bannister* | Berube was fired on December 12, 2023, after the Blues started the season 13–14–1. In parts of six seasons with St. Louis, Berube compiled a 206–132–44 record with four playoff appearances, leading the franchise to its first Stanley Cup championship in 2019. Bannister, previously the head coach of the Blues' AHL affiliate, the Springfield Thunderbirds, was promoted to interim head coach. |
| Winnipeg Jets | Rick Bowness (temporary, October 23 – November 24) | Scott Arniel* | On October 23, 2023, Bowness announced that he was taking a temporary leave of absence after his wife suffered a seizure and was admitted to the hospital. Arniel, the associate coach, took over as interim head coach, and totaled a 9–2–2 record before Bowness returned from his leave on November 24. |

(*) Indicates interim

== Front office changes ==
General managers
Off–season
| Team | 2022–23 general manager | 2023–24 general manager | Notes |
|---|---|---|---|
| Calgary Flames | Brad Treliving | Don Maloney*; Craig Conroy | On April 17, 2023, five days after the conclusion of the Flames' season, and with his contract expiring, the team and Treliving mutually agreed to part ways. Treliving had served as general manager since 2014, overseeing five playoff appearances and two Pacific Division titles. Maloney, formerly general manager of the New York Islanders and Arizona Coyotes, and most recently a pro scout, was subsequently promoted to president of hockey operations, and assumed the role of interim general manager. Conroy, formerly the assistant general manager, was promoted to general manager on May 23. |
| Nashville Predators | David Poile | Barry Trotz | Poile announced on February 26, 2023, that he would retire as GM on June 30, but remain as a consultant. The sole general manager in Predators history until his retirement, Poile had served in the role since 1997, overseeing fifteen playoff appearances, two Central Division titles, one President's Trophy, and one Stanley Cup Final appearance. Poile also won the Jim Gregory General Manager of the Year Award in 2017. Trotz, who served as the team's first coach from 1997 to 2014, and most recently was head coach of the New York Islanders from 2018 to 2022, was announced as Poile's successor on the same day, formally assuming the general manager role on July 1. |
| Philadelphia Flyers | Chuck Fletcher; Daniel Briere* | Daniel Briere | Fletcher was fired on March 10, 2023, with the Flyers holding a record of 24–30–11. Fletcher had served as general manager since 2018, with the team making the playoffs once during his tenure. Assistant general manager Briere was named interim general manager, before being made the official general manager on May 11. |
| Pittsburgh Penguins | Ron Hextall | Kyle Dubas | Hextall was fired on April 14, 2023, one day after the conclusion of the Penguins' season, after the team missed the playoffs for the first time in 16 seasons. Hextall had served as general manager of the Penguins since 2021, overseeing two playoff appearances and one division championship. Dubas, most recently general manager of the Toronto Maple Leafs, was hired as president of hockey operations on June 1, assuming the role of interim general manager; he was later named permanent general manager on August 3, 2023. |
| Toronto Maple Leafs | Kyle Dubas | Brad Treliving | On May 19, 2023, one week after the Maple Leafs' elimination from the 2023 Stanley Cup playoffs, and with his contract expiring, the team announced that Dubas would not return. Dubas had served as general manager of the Maple Leafs since 2018, with the team reaching the playoffs all five years of his tenure, and winning one North Division title. Treliving, most recently general manager of the Calgary Flames, was named general manager on May 31. |
In–season
| Team | Outgoing general manager | Incoming general manager | Notes |
| Columbus Blue Jackets | Jarmo Kekäläinen | John Davidson* | Kekäläinen was fired on February 15, 2024, after the Blue Jackets began the season 16–26–10. Kekäläinen had served as general manager of the Blue Jackets since 2013, overseeing five playoff appearances, including the franchise's first playoff series win in 2019. Davidson, the president of hockey operations, was named interim general manager. |
| Ottawa Senators | Pierre Dorion | Steve Staios | Dorion was fired on November 1, 2023, after the Senators forfeited a first-round draft pick due to their role in issues surrounding the trade of Evgenii Dadonov to the Vegas Golden Knights, and Dadonov's subsequent voided trade to the Anaheim Ducks. Dorion had served as general manager of the Senators since 2016, overseeing one playoff appearance. Staios, the president of hockey operations, was subsequently named interim general manager, before being named official general manager on December 31. |

(*) Indicates interim

== Arena changes ==
- The Florida Panthers' home arena, FLA Live Arena, was renamed Amerant Bank Arena on September 19, 2023, as part of a naming rights agreement with Amerant Bank.

== Regular season ==
The regular season began on October 10, 2023, and ended on April 18, 2024.

=== International games ===
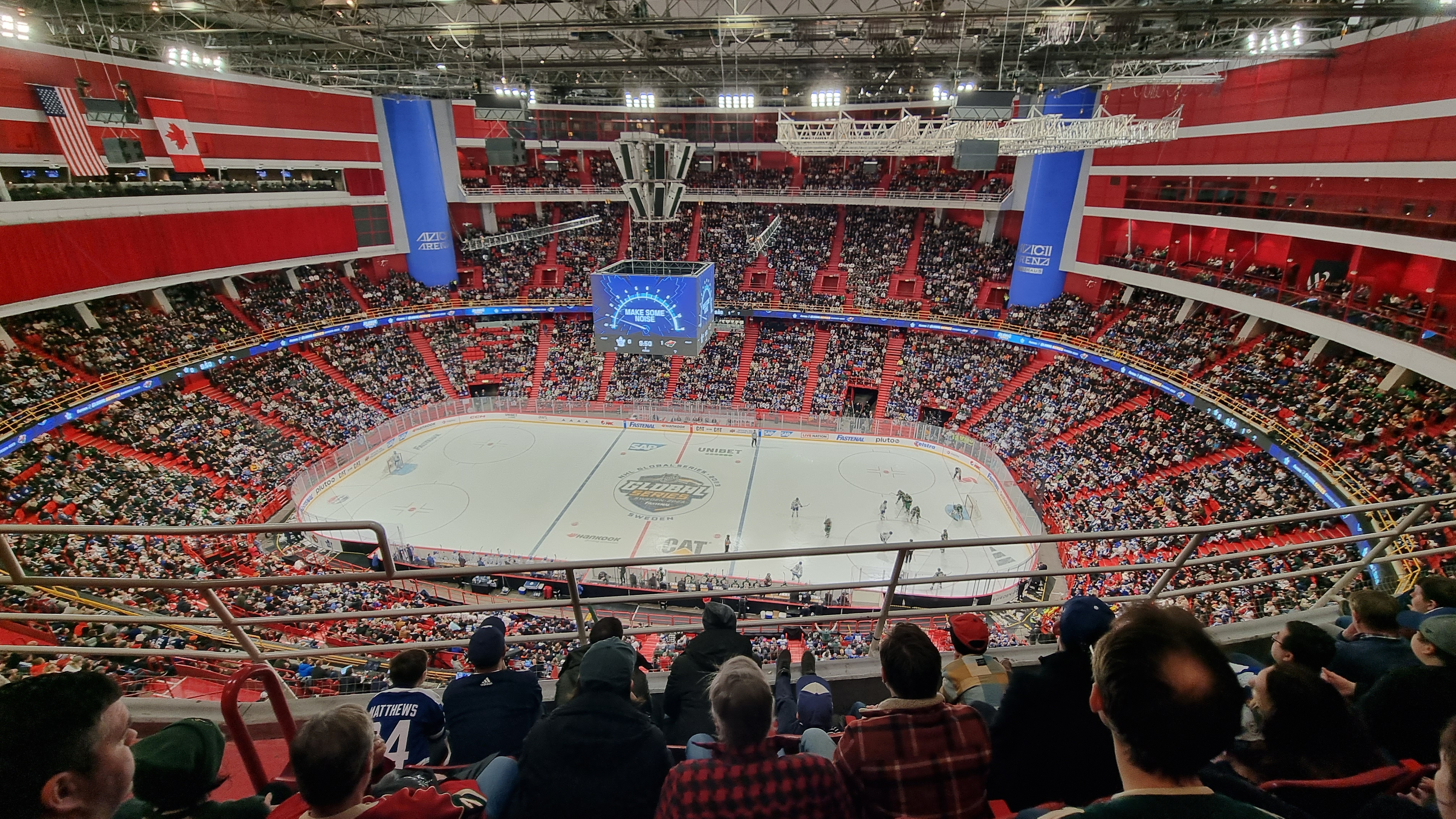
Avicii Arena during the Maple Leafs vs. Wild game on November 19

The league held four regular season games on four consecutive days at Avicii Arena in Stockholm, Sweden. The Detroit Red Wings and the Ottawa Senators faced each other on November 16. The Red Wings then played the Toronto Maple Leafs on November 17. The Minnesota Wild took on the Senators on November 18. Finally, the Wild played the Maple Leafs on November 19.

=== Outdoor games ===
The following outdoor games took place:

- The 2023 Heritage Classic was held on October 29 at Commonwealth Stadium in Edmonton, with the Edmonton Oilers hosting the Calgary Flames. This was the seventh game in the Heritage Classic series, and the first outdoor game in the Battle of Alberta rivalry.
- The 2024 NHL Winter Classic was held on January 1 at T-Mobile Park in Seattle, with the Seattle Kraken hosting the Vegas Golden Knights in a battle between the league's two youngest expansion teams.
- Two Stadium Series games were scheduled this season for the first time since 2016. Both were held at MetLife Stadium in East Rutherford, New Jersey. The Philadelphia Flyers faced the New Jersey Devils on February 17, and then the New York Rangers faced the New York Islanders on February 18.

=== All-Star Game ===
The 2024 All-Star Game took place on February 3, 2024, at Scotiabank Arena in Toronto, the home of the Toronto Maple Leafs. For the first time, the four-team, three-on-three format used since 2016 was combined with the "fantasy draft" format used from 2011 to 2015.

=== Postponed game ===
- The Buffalo Sabres home game against the Chicago Blackhawks scheduled for January 17, 2024, was postponed to January 18 due to winter storms and an associated travel ban in Western New York.

== Standings ==
=== Eastern Conference ===
Top 3 (Metropolitan Division)
| Pos | Team | GP | W | L | OTL | RW | GF | GA | GD | Pts |
|---|---|---|---|---|---|---|---|---|---|---|
| 1 | p – New York Rangers | 82 | 55 | 23 | 4 | 43 | 282 | 229 | +53 | 114 |
| 2 | x – Carolina Hurricanes | 82 | 52 | 23 | 7 | 44 | 279 | 216 | +63 | 111 |
| 3 | x – New York Islanders | 82 | 39 | 27 | 16 | 29 | 246 | 263 | −17 | 94 |

Source: National Hockey League
Rules for classification: 1) Fewer number of games played (GP, only during regular season); 2) Greater number of regulation wins (RW); 3) Greater number of wins in regulation and overtime, excluding shootout wins (ROW); 4) Greater number of total wins, including shootouts (W); 5) Greater number of points earned in head-to-head play; if teams played an uneven number of head-to-head games, the result of the first game on the home ice of the team with the extra home game is discarded; 6) Greater goal differential (GD); 7) Greater number of goals scored (GF)
p – Clinched Presidents' Trophy; x – Clinched playoff spot

Top 3 (Atlantic Division)
| Pos | Team | GP | W | L | OTL | RW | GF | GA | GD | Pts |
|---|---|---|---|---|---|---|---|---|---|---|
| 1 | y – Florida Panthers | 82 | 52 | 24 | 6 | 42 | 268 | 200 | +68 | 110 |
| 2 | x – Boston Bruins | 82 | 47 | 20 | 15 | 36 | 267 | 224 | +43 | 109 |
| 3 | x – Toronto Maple Leafs | 82 | 46 | 26 | 10 | 33 | 303 | 263 | +40 | 102 |

Source: National Hockey League
Rules for classification: 1) Fewer number of games played (GP, only during regular season); 2) Greater number of regulation wins (RW); 3) Greater number of wins in regulation and overtime, excluding shootout wins (ROW); 4) Greater number of total wins, including shootouts (W); 5) Greater number of points earned in head-to-head play; if teams played an uneven number of head-to-head games, the result of the first game on the home ice of the team with the extra home game is discarded; 6) Greater goal differential (GD); 7) Greater number of goals scored (GF)
x – Clinched playoff spot; y – Clinched division

Eastern Conference Wild Card
| Pos | Div | Team | GP | W | L | OTL | RW | GF | GA | GD | Pts |
|---|---|---|---|---|---|---|---|---|---|---|---|
| 1 | AT | x – Tampa Bay Lightning | 82 | 45 | 29 | 8 | 37 | 291 | 268 | +23 | 98 |
| 2 | ME | x – Washington Capitals | 82 | 40 | 31 | 11 | 32 | 220 | 257 | −37 | 91 |
| 3 | AT | Detroit Red Wings | 82 | 41 | 32 | 9 | 27 | 278 | 274 | +4 | 91 |
| 4 | ME | Pittsburgh Penguins | 82 | 38 | 32 | 12 | 32 | 255 | 251 | +4 | 88 |
| 5 | ME | Philadelphia Flyers | 82 | 38 | 33 | 11 | 30 | 235 | 261 | −26 | 87 |
| 6 | AT | Buffalo Sabres | 82 | 39 | 37 | 6 | 33 | 246 | 244 | +2 | 84 |
| 7 | ME | New Jersey Devils | 82 | 38 | 39 | 5 | 33 | 264 | 283 | −19 | 81 |
| 8 | AT | Ottawa Senators | 82 | 37 | 41 | 4 | 25 | 255 | 281 | −26 | 78 |
| 9 | AT | Montreal Canadiens | 82 | 30 | 36 | 16 | 20 | 236 | 289 | −53 | 76 |
| 10 | ME | Columbus Blue Jackets | 82 | 27 | 43 | 12 | 21 | 237 | 300 | −63 | 66 |

Source: National Hockey League
Rules for classification: 1) Fewer number of games played (GP, only during regular season); 2) Greater number of regulation wins (RW); 3) Greater number of wins in regulation and overtime, excluding shootout wins (ROW); 4) Greater number of total wins, including shootouts (W); 5) Greater number of points earned in head-to-head play; if teams played an uneven number of head-to-head games, the result of the first game on the home ice of the team with the extra home game is discarded; 6) Greater goal differential (GD); 7) Greater number of goals scored (GF)
x – Clinched playoff spot

=== Western Conference ===
Top 3 (Central Division)
| Pos | Team | GP | W | L | OTL | RW | GF | GA | GD | Pts |
|---|---|---|---|---|---|---|---|---|---|---|
| 1 | z – Dallas Stars | 82 | 52 | 21 | 9 | 40 | 298 | 234 | +64 | 113 |
| 2 | x – Winnipeg Jets | 82 | 52 | 24 | 6 | 46 | 259 | 199 | +60 | 110 |
| 3 | x – Colorado Avalanche | 82 | 50 | 25 | 7 | 42 | 304 | 254 | +50 | 107 |

Source: National Hockey League
Rules for classification: 1) Fewer number of games played (GP, only during regular season); 2) Greater number of regulation wins (RW); 3) Greater number of wins in regulation and overtime, excluding shootout wins (ROW); 4) Greater number of total wins, including shootouts (W); 5) Greater number of points earned in head-to-head play; if teams played an uneven number of head-to-head games, the result of the first game on the home ice of the team with the extra home game is discarded; 6) Greater goal differential (GD); 7) Greater number of goals scored (GF)
x – Clinched playoff spot; z – Clinched conference

Top 3 (Pacific Division)
| Pos | Team | GP | W | L | OTL | RW | GF | GA | GD | Pts |
|---|---|---|---|---|---|---|---|---|---|---|
| 1 | y – Vancouver Canucks | 82 | 50 | 23 | 9 | 44 | 279 | 223 | +56 | 109 |
| 2 | x – Edmonton Oilers | 82 | 49 | 27 | 6 | 39 | 294 | 237 | +57 | 104 |
| 3 | x – Los Angeles Kings | 82 | 44 | 27 | 11 | 37 | 256 | 215 | +41 | 99 |

Source: National Hockey League
Rules for classification: 1) Fewer number of games played (GP, only during regular season); 2) Greater number of regulation wins (RW); 3) Greater number of wins in regulation and overtime, excluding shootout wins (ROW); 4) Greater number of total wins, including shootouts (W); 5) Greater number of points earned in head-to-head play; if teams played an uneven number of head-to-head games, the result of the first game on the home ice of the team with the extra home game is discarded; 6) Greater goal differential (GD); 7) Greater number of goals scored (GF)
x – Clinched playoff spot; y – Clinched division

Western Conference Wild Card
| Pos | Div | Team | GP | W | L | OTL | RW | GF | GA | GD | Pts |
|---|---|---|---|---|---|---|---|---|---|---|---|
| 1 | CE | x – Nashville Predators | 82 | 47 | 30 | 5 | 38 | 269 | 248 | +21 | 99 |
| 2 | PA | x – Vegas Golden Knights | 82 | 45 | 29 | 8 | 34 | 267 | 245 | +22 | 98 |
| 3 | CE | St. Louis Blues | 82 | 43 | 33 | 6 | 31 | 239 | 250 | −11 | 92 |
| 4 | CE | Minnesota Wild | 82 | 39 | 34 | 9 | 32 | 251 | 263 | −12 | 87 |
| 5 | PA | Calgary Flames | 82 | 38 | 39 | 5 | 32 | 253 | 271 | −18 | 81 |
| 6 | PA | Seattle Kraken | 82 | 34 | 35 | 13 | 28 | 217 | 236 | −19 | 81 |
| 7 | CE | Arizona Coyotes | 82 | 36 | 41 | 5 | 28 | 256 | 274 | −18 | 77 |
| 8 | PA | Anaheim Ducks | 82 | 27 | 50 | 5 | 21 | 204 | 295 | −91 | 59 |
| 9 | CE | Chicago Blackhawks | 82 | 23 | 53 | 6 | 17 | 179 | 290 | −111 | 52 |
| 10 | PA | San Jose Sharks | 82 | 19 | 54 | 9 | 14 | 181 | 331 | −150 | 47 |

Source: National Hockey League
Rules for classification: 1) Fewer number of games played (GP, only during regular season); 2) Greater number of regulation wins (RW); 3) Greater number of wins in regulation and overtime, excluding shootout wins (ROW); 4) Greater number of total wins, including shootouts (W); 5) Greater number of points earned in head-to-head play; if teams played an uneven number of head-to-head games, the result of the first game on the home ice of the team with the extra home game is discarded; 6) Greater goal differential (GD); 7) Greater number of goals scored (GF)
x – Clinched playoff spot

== Playoffs ==
=== Bracket ===
In each round, teams compete in a best-of-seven series following a 2–2–1–1–1 format (scores in the bracket indicate the number of games won in each best-of-seven series). The team with home ice advantage plays at home for games one and two (and games five and seven, if necessary), and the other team is at home for games three and four (and game six, if necessary). The top three teams in each division make the playoffs, along with two wild cards in each conference, for a total of eight teams from each conference.

In the first round, the lower seeded wild card in each conference was played against the division winner with the best record while the other wild card was played against the other division winner, and both wild cards were de facto #4 seeds. The other series matched the second and third-place teams from the divisions. In the first two rounds, home ice advantage was awarded to the team with the better seed. In the conference finals and Stanley Cup Final, home ice advantage was awarded to the team with the better regular season record.

First round | Second round
A1 | Florida | 4
WC1 | Tampa Bay | 1
A1 | Florida | 4
A2 | Boston | 2
A2 | Boston | 4
A3 | Toronto | 3
Eastern Conference
M1 | NY Rangers | 4
WC2 | Washington | 0
M1 | NY Rangers | 4
M2 | Carolina | 2
M2 | Carolina | 4
M3 | NY Islanders | 1
C1 | Dallas | 4
WC2 | Vegas | 3
C1 | Dallas | 4
C3 | Colorado | 2
C2 | Winnipeg | 1
C3 | Colorado | 4
Western Conference
P1 | Vancouver | 4
WC1 | Nashville | 2
P1 | Vancouver | 3
P2 | Edmonton | 4
P2 | Edmonton | 4
P3 | Los Angeles | 1

Conference finals
A1 | Florida | 4
M1 | NY Rangers | 2
C1 | Dallas | 2
P2 | Edmonton | 4

Stanley Cup Final
A1 | Florida | 4
P2 | Edmonton | 3

== Statistics ==
=== Scoring leaders ===
The following players led the league in regular season points at the completion of games played on April 18, 2024.

| Player | Team | GP | G | A | Pts | +/– | PIM |
|---|---|---|---|---|---|---|---|
| Nikita Kucherov | Tampa Bay Lightning | 81 | 44 | 100 | 144 | +8 | 22 |
| Nathan MacKinnon | Colorado Avalanche | 82 | 51 | 89 | 140 | +35 | 42 |
| Connor McDavid | Edmonton Oilers | 76 | 32 | 100 | 132 | +35 | 30 |
| Artemi Panarin | New York Rangers | 82 | 49 | 71 | 120 | +18 | 24 |
| David Pastrnak | Boston Bruins | 82 | 47 | 63 | 110 | +21 | 47 |
| Auston Matthews | Toronto Maple Leafs | 81 | 69 | 38 | 107 | +31 | 20 |
| Leon Draisaitl | Edmonton Oilers | 81 | 41 | 65 | 106 | +26 | 76 |
| Mikko Rantanen | Colorado Avalanche | 80 | 42 | 62 | 104 | +19 | 50 |
| J. T. Miller | Vancouver Canucks | 81 | 37 | 66 | 103 | +32 | 58 |
| William Nylander | Toronto Maple Leafs | 82 | 40 | 58 | 98 | +1 | 24 |

=== Leading goaltenders ===
The following goaltenders led the league in regular season goals against average at the completion of games played on April 18, 2024, while playing at least 1,920 minutes.

| Player | Team | GP | TOI | W | L | OTL | GA | SO | SV% | GAA |
|---|---|---|---|---|---|---|---|---|---|---|
| Pyotr Kochetkov | Carolina Hurricanes | 42 | 2,371:29 | 23 | 13 | 4 | 92 | 4 | .911 | 2.33 |
| Sergei Bobrovsky | Florida Panthers | 58 | 3,414:14 | 36 | 17 | 4 | 135 | 6 | .915 | 2.37 |
| Connor Hellebuyck | Winnipeg Jets | 60 | 3,567:20 | 37 | 19 | 4 | 142 | 5 | .921 | 2.39 |
| Thatcher Demko | Vancouver Canucks | 51 | 3,015:53 | 35 | 14 | 2 | 123 | 5 | .918 | 2.45 |
| Joey Daccord | Seattle Kraken | 50 | 2,832:47 | 19 | 18 | 11 | 116 | 3 | .916 | 2.46 |
| Cam Talbot | Los Angeles Kings | 53 | 3,056:59 | 26 | 20 | 6 | 126 | 3 | .915 | 2.47 |
| Jeremy Swayman | Boston Bruins | 44 | 2,565:51 | 25 | 10 | 8 | 108 | 3 | .916 | 2.53 |
| Linus Ullmark | Boston Bruins | 40 | 2,400:08 | 22 | 10 | 7 | 103 | 2 | .915 | 2.57 |
| Ukko-Pekka Luukkonen | Buffalo Sabres | 54 | 3,081:14 | 27 | 22 | 4 | 132 | 5 | .910 | 2.57 |
| Igor Shesterkin | New York Rangers | 55 | 3,277:06 | 36 | 17 | 2 | 141 | 4 | .913 | 2.58 |

== NHL awards ==
Voting concluded immediately after the end of the regular season. Statistics-based awards such as the Art Ross Trophy, Maurice "Rocket" Richard Trophy, William M. Jennings Trophy and the Presidents' Trophy are announced at the end of the regular season. The Stanley Cup and the Conn Smythe Trophy are presented at the end of the Stanley Cup Final.

The Calder Memorial Trophy, Hart Memorial Trophy, Ted Lindsay Award, James Norris Memorial Trophy, and Vezina Trophy were presented during the annual NHL awards show on June 27 at the Fontainebleau Las Vegas. The other awards were announced during the playoffs.

2023–24 NHL awards
| Award | Recipient(s) | Runner(s)-up/Finalists | Ref |
|---|---|---|---|
| Presidents' Trophy (best regular-season record) | New York Rangers | Dallas Stars | |
| Prince of Wales Trophy (Eastern Conference playoff champion) | Florida Panthers | New York Rangers | |
| Clarence S. Campbell Bowl (Western Conference playoff champion) | Edmonton Oilers | Dallas Stars | |
| Art Ross Trophy (player with most points) | Nikita Kucherov (Tampa Bay Lightning) | Nathan MacKinnon (Colorado Avalanche) | |
| Bill Masterton Memorial Trophy (perseverance, sportsmanship, and dedication) | Connor Ingram (Arizona Coyotes) | Frederik Andersen (Carolina Hurricanes); Oliver Kylington (Calgary Flames) | |
| Calder Memorial Trophy (best first-year player) | Connor Bedard (Chicago Blackhawks) | Brock Faber (Minnesota Wild); Luke Hughes (New Jersey Devils) | |
| Conn Smythe Trophy (most valuable player, playoffs) | Connor McDavid (Edmonton Oilers) | Aleksander Barkov (Florida Panthers) | |
| Frank J. Selke Trophy (best defensive forward) | Aleksander Barkov (Florida Panthers) | Auston Matthews (Toronto Maple Leafs); Jordan Staal (Carolina Hurricanes) | |
| Hart Memorial Trophy (most valuable player, regular season) | Nathan MacKinnon (Colorado Avalanche) | Nikita Kucherov (Tampa Bay Lightning); Connor McDavid (Edmonton Oilers) | |
| Jack Adams Award (best coach) | Rick Tocchet (Vancouver Canucks) | Rick Bowness (Winnipeg Jets); Andrew Brunette (Nashville Predators) | |
| James Norris Memorial Trophy (best defenseman) | Quinn Hughes (Vancouver Canucks) | Roman Josi (Nashville Predators); Cale Makar (Colorado Avalanche) | |
| King Clancy Memorial Trophy (leadership and humanitarian contribution) | Anders Lee (New York Islanders) | N/A | |
| Lady Byng Memorial Trophy (sportsmanship and excellence) | Jaccob Slavin (Carolina Hurricanes) | Auston Matthews (Toronto Maple Leafs); Elias Pettersson (Vancouver Canucks) | |
| Ted Lindsay Award (outstanding player) | Nathan MacKinnon (Colorado Avalanche) | Nikita Kucherov (Tampa Bay Lightning); Auston Matthews (Toronto Maple Leafs) | |
| Mark Messier Leadership Award (leadership and community activities) | Jacob Trouba (New York Rangers) | N/A | |
| Maurice "Rocket" Richard Trophy (top goal-scorer) | Auston Matthews (Toronto Maple Leafs) | Sam Reinhart (Florida Panthers) | |
| Jim Gregory General Manager of the Year Award (top general manager) | Jim Nill (Dallas Stars) | Patrik Allvin (Vancouver Canucks); Bill Zito (Florida Panthers) | |
| Vezina Trophy (best goaltender) | Connor Hellebuyck (Winnipeg Jets) | Sergei Bobrovsky (Florida Panthers); Thatcher Demko (Vancouver Canucks) | |
| William M. Jennings Trophy (goaltender(s) of team with fewest goals against) | Connor Hellebuyck (Winnipeg Jets) | Sergei Bobrovsky and Anthony Stolarz (Florida Panthers) | |

=== All-Star teams ===
| Position | First Team | Second Team | Position | All-Rookie |
|---|---|---|---|---|
| G | Connor Hellebuyck, Winnipeg Jets | Thatcher Demko, Vancouver Canucks | G | Pyotr Kochetkov, Carolina Hurricanes |
| D | Quinn Hughes, Vancouver Canucks | Adam Fox, New York Rangers | D | Brock Faber, Minnesota Wild |
| D | Roman Josi, Nashville Predators | Cale Makar, Colorado Avalanche | D | Luke Hughes, New Jersey Devils |
| C | Nathan MacKinnon, Colorado Avalanche | Connor McDavid, Edmonton Oilers | F | Connor Bedard, Chicago Blackhawks |
| RW | Nikita Kucherov, Tampa Bay Lightning | David Pastrnak, Boston Bruins | F | Logan Cooley, Arizona Coyotes |
| LW | Artemi Panarin, New York Rangers | Filip Forsberg, Nashville Predators | F | Marco Rossi, Minnesota Wild |

== Uniforms ==
- This was the final season for Adidas as the official apparel provider of the NHL. Starting with the 2024–25 season, Fanatics became the official apparel provider on a 10-year contract.
- The NHL officially gave teams the option to wear their colored helmets on the road, provided they are not the same color as the home team's helmets. The new rule was revealed after the Carolina Hurricanes started wearing red helmets regularly with the road white uniforms the previous season, followed by both the Toronto Maple Leafs wearing the blue helmets with the road white uniforms during a Global Series tour in Sweden and the San Jose Sharks wearing the teal helmets with the road white uniforms.

=== Wholesale team changes ===
- The Anaheim Ducks unveiled their 30th anniversary alternate uniform, featuring the original 1993 to 2006 colors of eggplant base and jade, white, and silver stripes. The updated "Wild Wing" roundel crest with the current team name is emblazoned in front.
- The Boston Bruins unveiled the new logo and centennial patch for this upcoming season, keeping with the spoke "B", and instead of black lettering with yellow spokes going with yellow lettering with black spokes. The Bruins also unveiled special uniforms for the season, with the primary black and white uniforms sporting a metallic gold shade called "Centennial gold" and the alternate beige uniform using the 1970s uniform template albeit in the original brown and gold colors.
- The Carolina Hurricanes unveiled a white version of their previous Hartford Whalers throwback alternates, featuring Hartford's "Pucky the Whale" mascot as the shoulder patch.
- The Minnesota Wild introduced a new "78's" alternate uniform based on their green Minnesota North Stars-influenced 2022–23 Reverse Retro jersey, but with the addition of Minnesota-shaped captain patches and a "State of Hockey" shoulder patch.
- The New York Rangers introduced a new navy blue alternate uniform, inspired by New York City, and featuring their shield logo as the crest for the first time since 1978.
- The Philadelphia Flyers unveiled new uniforms, returning to the burnt orange shade they wore from 1982 to 2007 and featured visual cues from previous uniforms. The black alternate was retained.
- The San Jose Sharks introduced a new black alternate uniform, featuring their alternate shark fin logo as the crest and containing elements inspired by Northern California.
- The Toronto Maple Leafs revealed an updated version of their annual Toronto St. Pats throwback jerseys, replacing the previous "ST. PATS" wordmark with a shamrock crest, and modifying the name and number fonts.
- The Winnipeg Jets unveiled a new powder-blue specialty alternate uniform commemorating the centennial of the Royal Canadian Air Force, with a design based on those worn by the RCAF Flyers at the 1948 Winter Olympics. The previous heritage alternates were retained as the full-time third jerseys.

=== Outdoor game uniforms ===
- The Calgary Flames and Edmonton Oilers introduced uniforms for the Heritage Classic that were inspired by the Calgary Stampeders and Edmonton Mercurys.
- The Seattle Kraken and Vegas Golden Knights introduced uniforms for the NHL Winter Classic. Seattle's uniforms were inspired by the Seattle Metropolitans, while Vegas unveiled a faux-back uniform, featuring a vintage white base with heritage gold stripes and a new stylized gray "V" crest.
- The New Jersey Devils, New York Islanders, New York Rangers and Philadelphia Flyers introduced uniforms for the NHL Stadium Series. New Jersey's uniform had a red and black jersey featuring a simplified "NJ" crest, without the surrounding circle. The Islanders unveiled a navy blue uniform with a large orange stripe, inspired by Plimsoll lines painted on ships, and an "ISLES" wordmark. The Rangers' uniform was white with red, white, and blue stripes resembling their road uniform, and a diagonal "NYR" wordmark. Philadelphia unveiled a white uniform with orange and black sleeve stripes, the latter of which stretched through the nameplate.

== Milestones ==
=== First games ===
The following is a list of notable players who played their first NHL game during the 2023–24 season, listed with their first team.

| Player | Team | Notability |
|---|---|---|
| Connor Bedard | Chicago Blackhawks | First overall pick in the 2023 draft, 2023–24 Calder Memorial Trophy winner, NHL All-Rookie Team selection |
| Lane Hutson | Montreal Canadiens | 2024–25 Calder Memorial Trophy winner |

=== Last games ===
The following is a list of players of note who played their last NHL game in 2023–24, listed with their team:

| Player | Team | Notability |
|---|---|---|
| Pierre-Edouard Bellemare | Seattle Kraken | Most games played of any French-born player in NHL history |
| Jeff Carter | Pittsburgh Penguins | Over 1,300 games played, two-time NHL All-Star |
| Cal Clutterbuck | New York Islanders | Over 1,000 games played |
| Andrew Cogliano | Colorado Avalanche | Over 1,200 games played |
| Logan Couture | San Jose Sharks | Two-time NHL All-Star |
| Sam Gagner | Edmonton Oilers | Over 1,000 games played, one of 13 players to score 8 points in an NHL game |
| Johnny Gaudreau | Columbus Blue Jackets | Lady Byng Memorial Trophy winner, one-time NHL All-Star team selection, seven-time NHL All-Star, NHL All-Rookie Team selection; died on August 29, 2024, after a traffic accident |
| Mark Giordano | Toronto Maple Leafs | Over 1,100 games played, James Norris Memorial Trophy winner, NHL Foundation Player Award winner, Mark Messier Leadership Award winner, one-time NHL All-Star Team selection, three-time NHL All-Star |
| Alex Goligoski | Minnesota Wild | Over 1,000 games played |
| Milan Lucic | Boston Bruins | Over 1,100 games played |
| Kyle Okposo | Florida Panthers | Over 1,000 games played, one-time NHL All-Star |
| T. J. Oshie | Washington Capitals | Over 1,000 games played, one-time NHL All-Star |
| Zach Parise | Colorado Avalanche | Over 1,200 games played, one-time NHL All-Star team selection |
| Joe Pavelski | Dallas Stars | Over 1,300 games played, one-time NHL All-Star team selection, four-time NHL All-Star |
| Antti Raanta | Carolina Hurricanes | William M. Jennings Trophy winner |
| Marc Staal | Philadelphia Flyers | Over 1,100 games played |
| Blake Wheeler | New York Rangers | Over 1,100 games played, one-time NHL All-Star team selection, two-time NHL All-Star |

=== Major milestones reached ===
- On October 10, 2023, Pittsburgh Penguins forwards Sidney Crosby and Evgeni Malkin and defenseman Kris Letang played their first game of the season as a trio, setting a new record for most seasons (18) as a trio in North American "big 4" sports history, and surpassing the record previously held by the New York Yankees' trio of Derek Jeter, Jorge Posada, and Mariano Rivera.
- On October 14, 2023, Toronto Maple Leafs forward Auston Matthews recorded a second consecutive hat trick in Toronto's second game of the season, becoming the fifth player in NHL history to open a season with consecutive hat tricks, and the second since 1917–18.
- On October 19, 2023, the Vegas Golden Knights defeated the Winnipeg Jets, becoming the third defending Stanley Cup champion to begin the following season with five consecutive wins, joining both the 1985–86 Edmonton Oilers and 1920–21 Ottawa Senators. After subsequently defeating the Chicago Blackhawks on October 22 for their sixth consecutive victory, Vegas set a new record for the longest season-opening winning streak of a defending Stanley Cup champion.
- On October 24, 2023, Washington Capitals forward Alexander Ovechkin scored his 300th power-play goal, becoming the first player in NHL history to reach the mark.
- On October 24, 2023, the Colorado Avalanche defeated the New York Islanders for their 15th consecutive road victory in the regular season (dating back to the 2022–23 season), setting a new record for the longest winning streak on the road, and surpassing the record previously held by the Buffalo Sabres (14 consecutive road wins between the 2005–06 and 2006–07 seasons).
- On October 31, 2023, Nashville Predators forward Ryan O'Reilly played his 1,000th NHL game, becoming the 383rd player to reach the mark.
- On November 4, 2023, the Washington Capitals won their 1,000th home game in franchise history.
- On November 4, 2023, the San Jose Sharks allowed 10 goals against for the second consecutive game, becoming the first team to allow 10 goals in consecutive games since the 1965–66 Boston Bruins. Additionally, the Sharks lost their 11th consecutive game to begin the season, tying the 1943–44 New York Rangers, 2017–18 Arizona Coyotes, and 2021–22 Arizona Coyotes for the longest season-opening losing streak.
- On November 14, 2023, Buffalo Sabres forward Kyle Okposo played his 1,000th NHL game, becoming the 384th player to reach the mark.
- On November 19, 2023, Colorado Avalanche defenseman Cale Makar recorded his 200th assist in his 254th NHL game, becoming the fastest defenseman to reach 200 assists in NHL history, and surpassing the record previously held by Quinn Hughes.
- On November 22, 2023, New York Islanders forward Cal Clutterbuck played his 1,000th NHL game, becoming the 385th player to reach the mark.
- On November 30, 2023, Pittsburgh Penguins goaltender Tristan Jarry became the 14th goaltender in NHL history to score a goal in an NHL game.
- On December 3, 2023, the New York Rangers won their 3,000th regular season game in franchise history.
- On December 4, 2023, Tampa Bay Lightning defenseman Victor Hedman played his 1,000th NHL game, becoming the 386th player to reach the mark.
- On December 7, 2023, Dallas Stars forward Matt Duchene played his 1,000th NHL game, becoming the 387th player to reach the mark.
- On December 7, 2023, the Los Angeles Kings recorded their 11th consecutive road victory to start the regular season, setting a new record for the longest winning streak on the road to begin the season, and surpassing the record previously held by the 2006–07 Buffalo Sabres.
- On December 7, 2023, Washington Capitals forward Alexander Ovechkin recorded his 1,500th point, becoming the 16th player to reach the mark.
- On December 11, 2023, Toronto Maple Leafs forward John Tavares recorded his 1,000th point, becoming the 98th player to reach the mark.
- On December 27, 2023, Florida Panthers head coach Paul Maurice became the third coach in NHL history to coach 1,800 games.
- On December 27, 2023, Pittsburgh Penguins defenseman Kris Letang became the first defenseman in NHL history to record five points in a single period.
- On December 29, 2023, Philadelphia Flyers head coach John Tortorella became the eighth head coach in NHL history, as well as the first American head coach, to coach 1,500 games.
- On December 31, 2023, Minnesota Wild goaltender Marc-Andre Fleury played his 1,000th NHL game, becoming the 388th player, as well as the fourth goaltender, to reach the mark.
- On January 15, 2024, Minnesota Wild goaltender Marc-Andre Fleury recorded his 552nd win, surpassing Patrick Roy for second in all-time wins.
- On January 20, 2024, the Edmonton Oilers defeated the Calgary Flames to win their 13th straight game, surpassing the record previously held by the 1967–68 Montreal Canadiens for the longest winning streak by a Canadian team.
- On January 24, 2024, Florida Panthers head coach Paul Maurice coached his 1,813th game, surpassing Barry Trotz for the second-most games coached.
- On January 27, 2024, Pittsburgh Penguins forward Lars Eller played his 1,000th NHL game, becoming the first Danish-born and 389th overall player to reach the mark.
- On January 27, 2024, the Montreal Canadiens played their 7,000th regular season game in franchise history.
- On February 10, 2024, Washington Capitals forward Alexander Ovechkin scored his 57th empty-net goal, setting a new record for empty-net goals, and surpassing the record previously held by Wayne Gretzky.
- On February 12, 2024, Vegas Golden Knights defenseman Alex Pietrangelo played his 1,000th NHL game, becoming the 390th player to reach the mark.
- On February 13, 2024, Boston Bruins forward Brad Marchand played his 1,000th NHL game, becoming the 391st player to reach the mark.
- On February 18, 2024, New York Rangers forward Matt Rempe became the first player in NHL history to make his NHL debut in an outdoor game, doing so in the 2024 NHL Stadium Series.
- On February 21, 2024, Toronto Maple Leafs forward Auston Matthews scored his 50th goal of the season in his 54th game, becoming the fastest American-born player to 50 goals in a season, and surpassing the record previously shared by himself and Kevin Stevens. Matthews also became the first player to reach 50 goals in 55 games or fewer since Mario Lemieux did so in 1995–96.
- On February 28, 2024, the Vegas Golden Knights won their 300th regular season game, becoming the fastest team to 300 wins in NHL history, and surpassing the record previously held by the Edmonton Oilers.
- On March 5, 2024, Boston Bruins forward James van Riemsdyk played his 1,000th NHL game, becoming the 392nd player to reach the mark.
- On March 12, 2024, Seattle Kraken forward Jordan Eberle played his 1,000th NHL game, becoming the 393rd player to reach the mark.
- On March 16, 2024, Washington Capitals forward T. J. Oshie played his 1,000th NHL game, becoming the 394th player to reach the mark.
- On March 18, 2024, Washington Capitals forward Alexander Ovechkin scored his 20th goal of the season, becoming the third player in NHL history to record at least 20 goals in 19 consecutive seasons.
- On March 20, 2024, Los Angeles Kings forward Anze Kopitar recorded his 1,200th point, becoming the 52nd player to reach the mark.
- On March 23, 2024, St. Louis Blues defenseman Nick Leddy played his 1,000th NHL game, becoming the 395th player to reach the mark.
- On March 26, 2024, New York Rangers head coach Peter Laviolette became the seventh head coach in NHL history to win 800 games. Additionally, the Rangers clinched a playoff berth, making Laviolette the first head coach in NHL history to reach the playoffs with six different teams.
- On March 30, 2024, Washington Capitals defenseman John Carlson played his 1,000th NHL game, becoming the 396th player to reach the mark.
- On March 30, 2024, Winnipeg Jets goaltender Connor Hellebuyck played his 500th NHL game, becoming the 79th goaltender to reach the mark.
- On March 30, 2024, New York Rangers goaltender Jonathan Quick recorded his 392nd win, setting a new record for wins among American-born goaltenders, and surpassing the record previously held by Ryan Miller.
- On March 30, 2024, Toronto Maple Leafs forward Auston Matthews scored his 60th goal of the season for the second time in his career, recording the 43rd 60-goal season in NHL history.
- On April 1, 2024, Pittsburgh Penguins forward Sidney Crosby recorded his 82nd point of the season, securing his 19th season averaging at least one point per game, and tying the record held by Wayne Gretzky for most point-per-game seasons.
- On April 2, 2024, Buffalo Sabres forward Jeff Skinner played his 1,000th NHL game, becoming the 397th player to reach the mark, as well as the first to do so without having appeared in a playoff game.
- On April 7, 2024, Carolina Hurricanes goaltender Frederik Andersen recorded his 294th win in his 494th game, surpassing Braden Holtby for the most goaltender wins through their first 500 games.
- On April 9, 2024, Toronto Maple Leafs forward Auston Matthews scored his 66th goal of the season, surpassing Alexander Ovechkin's modern record of 65 goals set in 2007–08. In addition, Matthews became the first player to score more than 65 goals in a single season since Mario Lemieux accomplished the feat in 1995–96.
- On April 9, 2024, Washington Capitals forward Alexander Ovechkin scored his 30th goal of the season, becoming the first player in NHL history to record 18 seasons of at least 30 goals.
- On April 11, 2024, Toronto Maple Leafs forward Auston Matthews scored his 50th even-strength goal of the season, becoming the seventh player to reach the mark, and the first since Teemu Selanne did so in 1992–93.
- On April 11, 2024, Pittsburgh Penguins forward Sidney Crosby recorded his 1,000th assist, becoming the 14th player to reach the mark. Crosby also surpassed Phil Esposito for tenth in all-time points, becoming the first player to enter the top ten since Jaromir Jagr did so in 2007–08.
- On April 13, 2024, Pittsburgh Penguins defenseman Erik Karlsson played his 1,000th NHL game, becoming the 398th player to reach the mark.
- On April 13, 2024, Detroit Red Wings goaltender James Reimer played his 500th game, becoming the 80th goaltender to reach the mark.
- On April 14, 2024, Calgary Flames forward Yegor Sharangovich recorded his 59th point of the season, setting a new single-season record for points among Belarusian players, and surpassing the record previously held by Mikhail Grabovski.
- On April 15, 2024, Edmonton Oilers forward Connor McDavid recorded his 100th assist of the season, becoming the fourth individual to reach the mark, and accomplishing the 14th 100-assist season in NHL history.
- On April 15, 2024, Nashville Predators defenseman Jeremy Lauzon recorded his 383rd hit of the season, setting a new single-season record for hits, and surpassing the record previously held by Matt Martin.
- On April 17, 2024, Tampa Bay Lightning forward Nikita Kucherov recorded his 100th assist of the season, becoming the fifth individual to reach the mark, and accomplishing the 15th 100-assist season in NHL history. In addition, Kucherov and Connor McDavid became the second pair of players to reach 100 assists in the same season, and the first since Wayne Gretzky and Mario Lemieux both recorded 114 assists in 1988–89.
- On May 20, 2024, Edmonton Oilers defenseman Evan Bouchard recorded his 20th point of the playoffs, becoming the first defenseman in NHL history to total 20 points through the first two rounds of the playoffs.
- On June 2, 2024, the Edmonton Oilers won the Western Conference, making Oilers forward Corey Perry the first player in NHL history to reach the Stanley Cup Final with five different franchises.
- On June 16, 2024, Edmonton Oilers forward Connor McDavid recorded his 32nd assist of the playoffs, setting a new single-playoff record for assists, and surpassing the record previously held by Wayne Gretzky.
- On June 15, 2024, Edmonton Oilers forward Connor McDavid recorded his 40th point of the playoffs, becoming the third individual to reach the mark, and accomplishing the fifth 40-point playoff in NHL history.
- On June 18, 2024, Edmonton Oilers forward Connor McDavid recorded four points in game five of the 2024 Stanley Cup Final, marking his second consecutive game with four points, and setting a new record for total points in consecutive Cup Final games.
- On June 21, 2024, Edmonton Oilers forward Zach Hyman scored his 16th goal of the playoffs, setting a new record for single-postseason goals in the salary-cap era, and surpassing the record previously held by Sidney Crosby and Alexander Ovechkin. In the process, Hyman became the third player to reach the mark in the past 30 years, after Pavel Bure and Joe Sakic.
- On June 24, 2024, the Florida Panthers won the Stanley Cup, making Panthers captain Aleksander Barkov the first Finnish-born captain to lead a team to the Cup. Panthers head coach Paul Maurice, in his 26th season as head coach, and having coached 1,848 regular-season games, also set a new record for most seasons and games as head coach before winning the Cup.

== Broadcast rights ==
=== National ===
==== Canada ====
This was the tenth season of the league's 12-year Canadian national broadcast rights deal with Sportsnet. This included Sportsnet's sub-licensing agreements to air Saturday Hockey Night in Canada (HNIC) games on CBC Television and French-language broadcasts on TVA Sports. Sportsnet's national schedule also included Monday Night Hockey, Wednesday Night Hockey, this season's four outdoor games, the Hockey Day in Canada games on January 20, and All-Star Weekend. HNIC games aired across CBC, one or more of the four Sportsnet feeds, Sportsnet One, Sportsnet 360, or Citytv; decisions on network assignments were made on a week-by-week basis, and select HNIC games were simulcast on multiple networks. Games were streamed on Sportsnet+, with national games available on the Standard level, out-of-market games on the Premium tier, and via authenticated streaming on participating teams. Regular season games on CBC were also simulcast on CBC Gem, which replaced CBCSports.ca.

==== United States ====
This was the third season of the league's seven-year U.S. national broadcast rights deals with the ESPN family of networks and TNT Sports (formerly Turner Sports during the first two seasons).

Regular season games were aired exclusively on ESPN on selected Tuesdays, Thursdays, and weekends; and ABC on selected Saturdays between mid-January and mid-April. ESPN+ and Hulu exclusively streamed games primarily on Tuesdays, Thursdays, and weekends throughout the season. (Note: For commercial customers, most of these ESPN+ exclusive games are available on ESPN+ for Business on DirecTV.) During All-Star Weekend, ESPN had the All-Star skills competition while ABC aired the All-Star Game. Both Stadium Series games were broadcast by ABC. A Presidents' Day doubleheader on February 19 was also scheduled on ESPN this season. Under the "NHL Power Play on ESPN+" branding, the streaming service also streamed ABC games, selected ESPN games, as well out-of-market games. For the second consecutive season, ESPN collaborated with Disney Channel on a youth-oriented alternate broadcast, using the NHL's player and puck tracking system to render a live animated version of the March 9, 2024, Pittsburgh Penguins–Boston Bruins game, portrayed by characters from the animated series Big City Greens.

WBD's regular season coverage was primarily on TNT, with games on Wednesday nights throughout the season, the Thanksgiving Showdown on November 24, Winter Classic, and selected Sunday games between late February and April. Not all of TNT's regular season games were exclusive broadcasts and were thus subject to blackout in local markets. WBD invoked its over-the-top streaming rights for Max, adding live sports telecasts from WBD channels; these broadcasts were available at no additional charge until a later date, after which viewers must subscribe to the Bleacher Report Sports add-on. This season's Heritage Classic instead aired on TBS due to TNT's soccer coverage of U.S. women's national soccer team. TruTV also began airing simulcasted/alternative broadcasts of selected TNT games, TruTV also televised a youth-oriented alternate broadcast, using the NHL's player and puck tracking system to render a live animated version of the Colorado Avalanche–Vegas Golden Knights game on April 14, 2024, portrayed by WBD characters featured in the MultiVersus video game.

NHL Network continued to also nationally televise selected regular season games, including Saturday and Sunday afternoon games as part of the NHL Network Showcase series.

=== Local ===
The Washington Capitals' broadcaster NBC Sports Washington rebranded as Monumental Sports Network before the start of the season. In September 2022, Monumental Sports & Entertainment bought out NBCUniversal's ownership stake in the channel.

==== Diamond Sports Group bankruptcy ====
The 12 NHL teams who had dealt with the Bally Sports regional sports networks may be affected by its operator Diamond Sports Group's March 14, 2023, decision to file for bankruptcy. Diamond had initially sought to continue broadcasting regional games while it plans to separate from majority parent Sinclair Broadcast Group as part of the reorganization.

The Los Angeles Kings renewed their contract with Bally Sports West despite Diamond's bankruptcy. The Kings also reached an agreement with KCAL-TV for the rights to six games and select half-hour specials.

On October 4, 2023, Diamond announced that it intended to reject its Bally Sports Arizona contract with the Arizona Coyotes. The next day, the Coyotes announced a new television agreement with the E. W. Scripps Company's sports division Scripps Sports, under which it carried games on a subchannel of its Phoenix broadcast station and ABC affiliate KNXV-TV, and syndicate them to sister stations in the team's broadcast territory, including KGUN-TV in Tucson, Arizona, and KUPX-TV and KSTU-DT2 in Salt Lake City. The Coyotes aired non-game programs on KNXV and sister The CW affiliate KASW. With Bally Sports Arizona already previously losing airing rights to the Phoenix Suns to Gray Television and the Arizona Diamondbacks to the MLB itself earlier in the year, they decided to wind down services for the rest of the month before concluding on October 21, 2023.

On December 20, 2023, Diamond Sports and the NHL reached an agreement that resulted in the contracts for teams airing on Diamond expiring after the 2023–24 NHL season. However, on January 17, 2024, Diamond Sports announced a restructuring agreement after receiving a $115 million investment from Amazon. The restructuring agreement would supersede the prior agreement with the NHL, so rights for the NHL would no longer expire following the 2023–24 season.

==== AT&T SportsNet closure ====
In February 2023, Warner Bros. Discovery announced it was winding down its AT&T SportsNet regional sports network business, affecting the Pittsburgh Penguins and the Vegas Golden Knights' broadcasters, AT&T SportsNet Pittsburgh and AT&T SportsNet Rocky Mountain, respectively. The Seattle Kraken's deal with Root Sports Northwest was not affected because Warner Bros. Discovery only held minority control of that network.

On May 4, 2023, the Golden Knights signed a multi-year agreement with Scripps Sports to start airing games on Scripps' Las Vegas broadcast station KMCC, and syndicate the telecasts to other stations across the team's broadcast territory; both KMCC and Salt Lake City's KUPX-TV were converted from Ion Television stations to independents to accommodate the team's broadcasts, along with Scripps's Montana Television Network, whose second digital subchannels previously carried The CW.

On August 30, 2023, the Penguins announced that they would acquire AT&T SportsNet Pittsburgh, which rebranded on October 2 as SportsNet Pittsburgh. The channel is operated by NESN—the regional broadcaster of the Boston Bruins—which is majority-owned by the Penguins' parent company Fenway Sports Group.

=== Personnel ===
ESPN/ABC studio analyst Chris Chelios, who served in the role for two seasons, left the network as part of its June 2023 cost-cutting measures. Chelios later made appearances on TNT during the season. In October, studio analyst Barry Melrose resigned after being diagnosed with Parkinson's disease.

TNT ice-level analyst Keith Jones left the network to become president of hockey operations with the Philadelphia Flyers. Before joining the Flyers' front office, Jones also worked as the team's TV color analyst for 23 seasons, while also working as a studio and game analyst with NBC and later TNT. To replace Jones, TNT hired Brian Boucher away from ESPN/ABC, serving the same role as he previously had with the latter network. Boucher also replaced Jones as a primary analyst on the Flyers' television broadcasts.

The Chicago Blackhawks hired Darren Pang to be their lead TV color commentator. Pang, who spent 14 years in the same role with the St. Louis Blues and is also a color commentator on TNT, replaces both Colby Cohen, whose contract with the team was not renewed and Patrick Sharp, who left to also join the Flyers front office, along with Keith Jones. The Blues replaced Pang with Jamie Rivers, who had been the backup color commentator whenever Pang worked for TNT before the announcement.

The Los Angeles Kings started using TV/radio simulcasts, keeping radio announcers Nick Nickson and Daryl Evans, and TV analyst Jim Fox. However, they did not renew the TV play-by-play announcer Alex Faust's contract. Faust later joined the New York Rangers as its tertiary radio play-by-play announcer behind Kenny Albert and Don La Greca.

The Pittsburgh Penguins' play-by-play announcers swapped roles, with Josh Getzoff moving from radio to TV, and Steve Mears moving from TV to radio. However, the team let go Bob Errey, their TV color commentator. To replace him, a rotation of Colby Armstrong, Mike Rupp, and Phil Bourque, who also provides color commentary on radio, is used.

The Seattle Kraken hired Al Kinisky as their radio analyst, replacing Dave Tomlinson, who moved to the Vancouver Canucks television booth.

Longtime commentator John Garrett retired from Vancouver Canucks broadcasts before the season. He continued to provide analysis on select national broadcasts throughout the season. Sportsnet later announced that Dave Tomlinson, formerly a radio analyst for the Seattle Kraken, would take over as the primary TV analyst for Canucks regional broadcasts, with ESPN lead analyst Ray Ferraro working as a substitute for select games.

On December 18, analyst Cassie Campbell-Pascall left Sportsnet to become a special advisor in the Professional Women's Hockey League (PWHL). She continues to work on select ESPN broadcasts in the U.S. in a smaller role.

Columbus Blue Jackets TV play-by-play announcer Jeff Rimer announced his retirement at the end of the season. Rimer, the TV voice of the Blue Jackets starting in the 2005–06 season, also had stints with the Washington Capitals and the Florida Panthers.

Boston Bruins TV play-by-play announcer Jack Edwards announced his retirement at the end of the season. Edwards joined the Bruins broadcast team before the 2005–06 season after several stints as an anchor and reporter on various networks, most notably with ESPN's SportsCenter.

== See also ==
- 2023–24 NHL transactions
- 2023–24 NHL suspensions and fines
- List of 2023–24 NHL Three Star Awards
- 2023 in sports
- 2024 in sports
- 2024 in ice hockey
