= History of ESPN =

ESPN is an American-based global cable and satellite television channel that focuses on sports-related programming.

== Origins ==
ESPN was founded by Bill Rasmussen, his son Scott Rasmussen, and 43 year old eye doctor and Aetna insurance agent Ed Eagan. Bill, who had an affinity with sports for much of his life, was fired from his position as the communications manager for the New England Whalers in 1978. During his tenure with the hockey team, Rasmussen had met Eagan, who displayed an interest in building a career in television. Eagan approached Bill with the idea of creating a monthly cable television program covering Connecticut sports and was curious to see if the Whalers would be interested in being the main feature on the show.

Though discouraged by his firing, Rasmussen and Eagan began to discuss a new course, Bill Rasmussen's original idea was to create a cable television network that focused on covering all sporting events in the state of Connecticut (for example, the Whalers, the Bristol Red Sox and the Connecticut Huskies), rather than just focusing on one team as Eagan had proposed. Rasmussen knew little about cable television at the time and with under 20% of homes receiving cable, the task to create such a network was tedious.

In the summer of 1978, the Rasmussens, with Eagan and his associate Bob Beyus – who owned a video production company – began to seek out support from cable operators and potential investors for the sports channel which they had come to name the Entertainment and Sports Programming Network (ESP). They began to pitch their idea on June 26 of that year, inviting twelve representatives from local cable operators – only five of whom had accepted the offer. The representatives that were present were skeptical of the concept and stated that it would be impractical and too costly to take a risk on something that would seemingly falter. Despite the setback, the team held a press conference to help spread the word. 35 reporters were invited, however only four appeared and were less than enthusiastic about the prospects of the company. Beyus felt the future of ESP was in doubt and departed following the conference.

In spite of these initial difficulties, ESP was incorporated on July 13, 1978, for a fee of $91. The trio still had to find a way to broadcast their new sports channel and began their research at United Cable, where they were told about a new means of television distribution, satellite communication. They were then directed to RCA, which had experience in satellite communication, having launched Satcom into orbit and frequently using the technology in Europe, the concept was still new in the United States (satellite delivery was first used for full-time television broadcasts by HBO in September 1975), and was not immediately embraced. Al Parinello, who was hired by RCA to promote the new technology, received a phone call from Rasmussen and wanted to meet with him in person. At the meeting, Bill explained they were interested in regional sports broadcasting, however, Parinello explained that with satellite communication, their channel could be broadcast across the country. Furthermore, when they were informed that buying a continuous 24-hour satellite feed was less expensive than sending the signal across Connecticut via landlines, they agreed to buy the transponder for the satellite.

With a wider audience to appeal to, they began to retool their original concept, and on August 16, 1978, both father and son agreed that the channel would show all types of sports 24 hours a day, have a half-hour sports show every night, hire sportscasters and buy a fleet of trucks to travel across the nation covering various sporting events. Putting together money from various family members and associates, they put down $30,000 for the transponder. The group then had to search for property to set up their headquarters. They originally began looking for land in Plainville, however, due to an ordinance that prohibited satellite dishes, ESP could not settle there. Instead, they chose to buy a parcel of land for $18,000 in Bristol that had been built on a dump, the satellite signal was unaffected in the area, making it an ideal location.

== Initial financing and development ==
The Rasmussens received financial aid from J. B. Doherty and K. S. Sweet Associates on an interim basis, but they were interested in finding permanent investors. Doherty shared a similar sentiment and after several failed attempts to do so, he approached Stuart Evey, a Getty Oil Company executive who was the vice president of non-oil operations. Evey was immediately interested in the venture and brought it to the attention of Getty's finance manager, George Conner. Though a bit wary, the company decided to invest in the project by February 1979.

== College sports rights ==
With the newly found financial assistance, Bill, aware that ESP would struggle to secure rights to professional sports at the time, felt the company could strike a deal with the National Collegiate Athletic Association (NCAA) for the rights to rebroadcast their college sporting events. College basketball at the time was popular, and Rasmussen felt rebroadcasting games such as the fast-paced basketball would attract new viewers. Furthermore, by having a contract with the NCAA, it would legitimize ESP without Rasmussen having to utilize the Getty name to help further his pursuits. Rasmussen organized a meeting with NCAA officials and, following a hastily put together presentation, negotiations began, the parties eventually came to terms. In the agreement, ESP agreed to broadcast eighteen different NCAA sports, including championship games, in their entirety, for two years. The contract was made official on March 14, 1979.

Though ESP would not launch for some six months, the 1979 NCAA Men's Division I Basketball Tournament had garnered considerable attention, as it was watched by 24.1 million viewers, due to the matchup between Larry Bird and Magic Johnson – the tournament is regarded as having an instrumental part in ESP's eventual success due to the fact many viewers called their cable providers asking that they wanted "that channel that has all the basketball."

In May 1979, Getty provided $15 million to the company and Anheuser-Busch came to an agreement with ESP for the largest advertising contract in cable television history at the time, valued at $1.38 million.

== Leadership and personnel ==
Rasmussen, realizing that ESP needed additional sponsors and advertising, decided to distinguish the network from the "Big Three three-letter networks," ABC, NBC, and CBS, and renamed ESP as ESPN-TV. The name was shortened to just ESPN prior to the channel's launch. Evey, who had essentially gained control of the company, sought out ESPN's first president. Rasmussen wanted to hire Dick Ebersol, who had been fired from NBC in January 1979, but Evey had little interest in doing so. Ebersol suggested Chet Simmons, who at the time was running NBC Sports but had become increasingly frustrated with NBC chairman Jane Cahill Pfeiffer, whose visions conflicted with those of Simmons. Evey promised Simmons that he would face little interference from Rasmussen, without Bill's knowledge, and Simmons agreed to become the network's first president – an appointment that was officially announced on July 18, 1979.

With the Rasmussens gradually being pushed out of the company, Evey and Simmons continued to move forward, hiring a broadcasting team that included Jim Simpson, George Grande, Bob Ley, Lee Leonard, Greg Gumbel, Chris Berman and Dick Vitale. As ESPN's launch date approached, the building that would house the new network had yet to be completed – the cable which was connected to the satellite was only plugged in about five minutes prior to the launch of the network.

== Debut ==
External videos
- ESPN Broadcast, 1979 APSPL World Series, Game 8, Milwaukee at Kentucky

On September 7, 1979, at 7:00 p.m. Eastern Time, an estimated 30,000 viewers tuned in to witness the launch of ESPN. Simultaneously, ESPN debuted its first SportsCenter telecast with anchors Lee Leonard and George Grande. About 1.4 million homes tuned in to the launch of this new channel. The first words spoken were from Leonard who informed viewers: "If you're a fan, if you're a fan, what you'll see in the next minutes, hours, and days to follow may convince you you've gone to sports heaven." The first score Grande announced was Chris Evert's victory over Billie Jean King at the US Open. SportsCenter lasted a half-hour, consisting mainly of videotaped highlights. Following the conclusion of the telecast, the network aired a men's professional slow-pitch softball game from Lannon, Wisconsin with Joe Boyle working play-by-play, former Yankees player Johnny Blanchard offering color commentary and former Detroit Tigers catcher Jim Price as field reporter. It was the first game of a best-of-nine World Series between the Milwaukee Schlitz and the Kentucky Bourbons.

Early programming also included boxing, wrestling and college soccer. The initial music package in 1979 was composed by veteran production music composer Dave Shields with Mel Hall at Cinira Corp in San Diego using studio musicians from Hollywood and San Diego. He wrote a logo melody and expanded it for various purposes, and composed themes for all the programs at that time, including a reggae-rock style promotional song. They also used Vangelis's "Pulstar" as the theme to SportsCenter early on.

SportsCenter, the channel's flagship program, would grow in popularity throughout its history and became known for the six-note theme (colloquially referred to as "DaDaDa, DaDaDa") that was written by John Colby, who served as ESPN's music director, producer and composer from 1984 to 1992 (who has also served as the music director and bandleader for the ESPY Awards since the show's inception in 1993, and has composed themes for other ESPN programs and sports telecasts including college sports, NBA and NFL broadcasts, Outside the Lines and ESPNews).

Two days after their first broadcast, Evey issued an ultimatum to Bill, in which he stated that Rasmussen should remain out of the way as he had little command within the company anymore. Scott was fired by Evey as there were growing conflicts between Evey, Simmons and Rasmussen.

ESPN struggled financially during its early years. In 1980, Anheuser-Busch Vice President and Director of Marketing Michael Roarty persuaded his company to invest $1 million in ESPN. Anheuser-Busch gave an additional $5 million to the network in 1981. Roarty saw these investments as a smart business decision, telling the St. Louis Post-Dispatch in 1994, "We gave them $1 million that first year. And if we hadn't, they'd have gone under ... I believed the beer drinker was a sports lover ... The next year we gave them $5 million. I think it turned out to be the best investment we've ever made." In 1993, Sporting News named Roarty the sixth most powerful figure in American sports, citing his early commitment to ESPN.

== Professional sports arrive ==
ESPN (along with the USA Network) was among the earliest cable-based broadcast partners for the National Basketball Association (NBA). Lasting from 1982 to 1984, ESPN's relationship with the NBA marked its initial foray into American professional sports. After an 18-year hiatus, ESPN (by then, under the auspices of the ABC network) secured a $2.4 billion, six-year broadcast contract with the NBA, thereby revitalizing its historic compact with U.S. professional basketball.

ESPN was also a long time home for motorsports broadcasts as part of their Auto Racing (later ESPN SpeedWorld) block of programming with Larry Nuber and Bob Jenkins in the booth from 1979 to 2006 along with Bob Varsha, Ned Jarrett, Jon Beekhuis, Jackie Stewart, Mike Joy, Dr. Jerry Punch, Eli Gold, Marty Reid, Paul Page, and Ken Squier. ESPN still broadcasts auto racing to this day but without the SpeedWorld branding.

In 1983, the United States Football League (USFL) made its debut on ESPN and ABC. The league – which lasted for three seasons – enjoyed ephemeral success, some portion of which was a byproduct of the exposure afforded through ESPN coverage.

In 1984, ABC reached a deal with Getty Oil to acquire ESPN. ABC retained an 80% share, and sold a 20% interest to Nabisco. The Nabisco shares were later sold to the Hearst Corporation, which still holds a 20% ownership stake in the channel today. In May 1985, ABC was purchased by Capital Cities Communications in a $3.5 billion deal that was finalized in February 1986. In February 1996, The Walt Disney Company purchased Capital Cities/ABC for $19 billion, and assumed ABC's 80% stake in ESPN at that time. According to an analysis published by Barron's Magazine in February 2008, ESPN "is probably worth more than 40% of Disney's entire value... based on prevailing cash-flow multiples in the industry." Despite it technically being a joint venture, for all intents and purposes, ESPN operates as a division of Disney as a result of the company's controlling interest (as it was with ABC and Capital Cities before it).

On July 15, 1985, ESPN started airing the "ESPN Sports Update" (later known as the "28/58 Update"), a condensed rundown of scores and news that aired at 28 and 58 minutes past the hour at times when SportsCenter was not airing. Later, when the viewers were used to it, the updates would often start with a sponsor where it used to say "28/58 Update" and the vertical display of "Update." The airtimes of these updates were modified to 18 and 58 minutes past the hour on May 30, 2005.

In 1987, ESPN gained partial rights to the National Football League (NFL). The league agreed to the deal, as long as ESPN agreed to simulcast the games on broadcast television stations in the local markets of the participating teams. ESPN Sunday Night Football would last for 19 years and spur ESPN's rise to legitimacy. During the 2006 NFL season, ESPN began airing Monday Night Football, formerly seen on its sister network ABC (NBC took over broadcast rights to the Sunday night game package). Former Commissioner Paul Tagliabue credits ESPN for revolutionizing the NFL: "ESPN was able to take the draft, the pregame and highlight shows, and other NFL programming to a new level."

In 1990, ESPN added Major League Baseball (MLB) to its lineup with the signing of a $400 million contract to broadcast the league's games. The contract was renewed and continued through to 2011. Jon Miller and Joe Morgan served as the longtime voices of ESPN's centerpiece Sunday Night Baseball broadcasts through the 2010 season. Steve Phillips joined the announcing team for the 2009 season, but was later dismissed by the network that October. In December 2010, ESPN announced that Orel Hersheiser, Dan Shulman, and Bobby Valentine would be the new announcers of Sunday Night Baseball for the 2011 season. Valentine went back to managing after the 2011 season and was replaced by Terry Francona (Valentine and Francona essentially switched duties, Valentine became manager of the Boston Red Sox and Terry Francona became an analyst for Sunday Night Baseball).

ESPN broadcast each of the four major professional sports leagues in North America from 2002 until 2004, when it cut ties with the National Hockey League (NHL). ESPN aired NHL games from 1980 to 1982, from 1986 to 1989, from 1992 to 2004, and most recently from 2021 to the present. ESPN has been broadcasting Major League Soccer games about once a week on ESPN2 since that league's inception in 1996. In most years, the annual All-Star Game and MLS Cup championship game, and in some years, the Opening Night game, are shown on ABC broadcast stations.

With the increasing cost of live sports entertainment, such as the US$8.8 billion cost to acquire NFL football broadcast rights for eight years, "scripted entertainment has become a luxury item for ESPN," said David Carter, director of the Sports Business Institute at the University of Southern California in a 2007 interview in Variety.

ESPN broadcasts 65 sports, 24 hours a day in 16 languages in more than 200 countries.

== Expansion ==
ESPN set itself apart from its competition by using the top reporters for each of their respective sports by the early 1990s. Some examples include: Peter Gammons (baseball), Chris Mortensen (football), Al Morganti (hockey), David Aldridge (basketball) and Mel Kiper, Jr. (NFL draft). Other well-known reporters have included Andrea Kremer, Ed Werder and Mark Schwartz.

The 1990s and early 2000s saw a considerable growth within the company. ESPN Radio launched on January 1, 1992 and has seen tremendous success. ESPN2 was launched on October 1, 1993, beginning with the inaugural telecast of SportsNite, hosted by Keith Olbermann and Suzy Kolber. Three years later on November 1, 1996, ESPNews was launched, with Mike Tirico as the channel's first anchor. In 1997, ESPN acquired the Classic Sports Network for $175 million from the channel's founders, Brian Bedol and Steve Greenberg, and renamed it ESPN Classic. ESPNU, a network focusing exclusively on collegiate sports, was launched on March 4, 2005.

ESPN made its expansion into video gaming by joining forces with game publisher Sony Imagesoft for a series of video games in 1993. The venture was short-lived, only releasing fewer titles for the SNES, Sega Genesis and Sega CD.

In 1994, ESPN launched The ESPN Sports Poll, created by the Chilton Company. The Sports Poll was the first ongoing national daily study of sports fan activities and interests in the United States. Sporting News acknowledged the accomplishments of The ESPN Sports Poll in 1996.

Disney planned to start an ESPN West in late 1998, a regional sports network for the Greater Los Angeles Area that would air live games of the Anaheim Angels and Mighty Ducks of Anaheim, but the plan was abandoned. In mid 1998, ESPN partnered with video game developer Radical Entertainment, to start the ESPN Digital Games brand, with Buena Vista Home Entertainment distributing. After split talks between Disney and Radical, Electronic Arts took on publishing only one title out of the deal.

In 1999, ESPN joined forces with Konami and Disney Interactive for a series of video games called ESPN the Games, to replace the Konami XXL Sports Series branding, to release a series of titles for the PlayStation, Dreamcast, Game Boy Advance, Game Boy Color, Nintendo 64, Xbox, GameCube and PlayStation 2. The venture ended in 2002, and joined forces with Sega. The venture made its full expansion when ESPN, Visual Concepts and Sega teamed up to set up the ESPN Videogames to replace the Sega Sports label as part of the retooling of the 2K game franchise. In 2005, just before the expiration of the ESPN-2K alliance, ESPN then signed up a 15-year agreement with Electronic Arts to allow ESPN personalities and presentations to appear on EA Sports games for the next 15 years.

After Disney's acquisition of ESPN, ABC Sports began to increasingly integrate its operations with the network in 1996. That year Steve Bornstein, president of ESPN since 1990, was also made president of ABC Sports. This integration culminated in the 2006 decision to merge ABC Sports' operations with ESPN, which transitioned all ABC Sports telecasts to ESPN-styled productions and branding under the banner ESPN on ABC. However, due to the nature of ESPN still being a joint venture between Disney and Hearst, ESPN on ABC is still legally separate from ESPN, since Hearst has no ownership interest in the ABC network.

In 1998, ESPN also began utilizing a "Skycam" during its NHL broadcasts, later expanding its use to baseball, basketball and football games. In 2007, ESPN signed an agreement with the Arena Football League to broadcast at least one game every week, usually on Monday nights. In January 2008, ESPN signed a multimillion-dollar contract with professional gaming circuit, Major League Gaming (MLG).

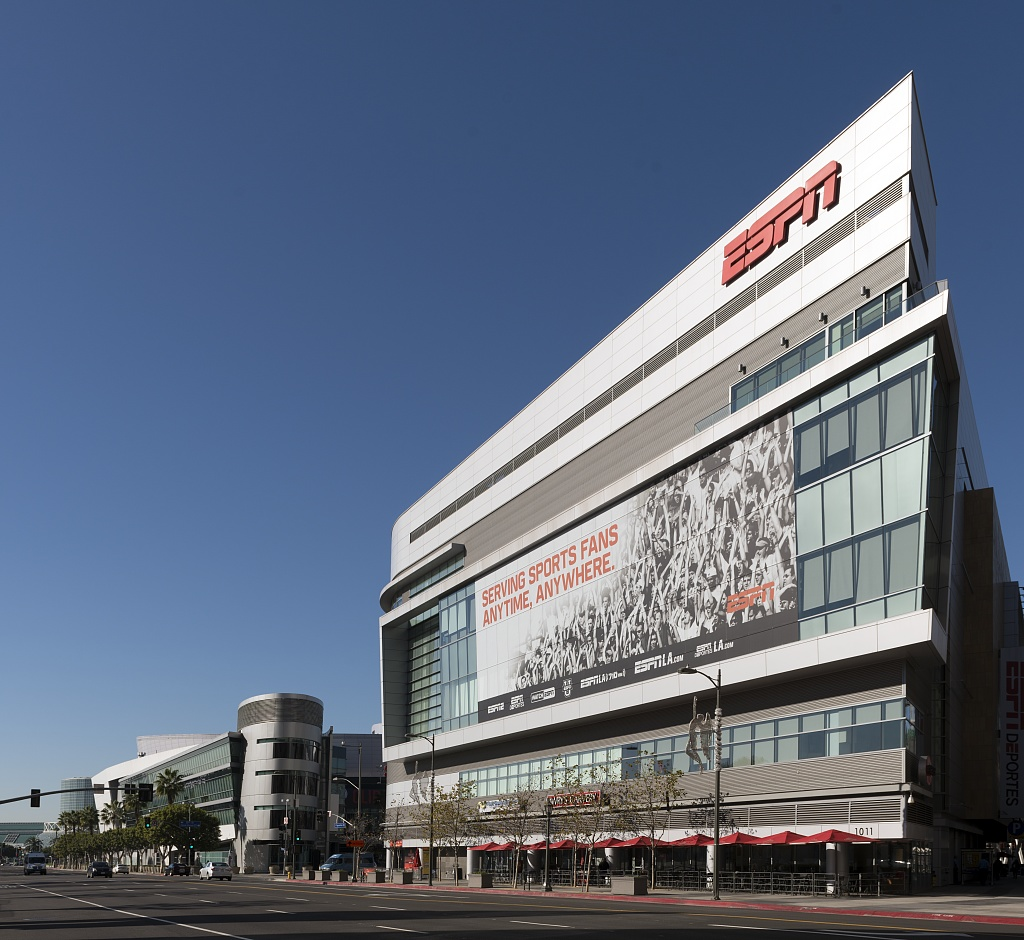
The West Coast headquarters and studio building for ESPN.

In April 2009, ESPN opened a broadcast production facility in downtown Los Angeles at the L.A. Live complex, across from Staples Center. The five-story facility houses two television production studios with digital control rooms on the upper floors, and previously held an ESPN Zone restaurant on the first two floors until the restaurant's closure in 2013. One of the studios serves as the production and broadcast facilities for the late night editions of SportsCenter.

In October 2009, ESPN marked its 30th anniversary with the premiere of 30 for 30, a series of documentaries focusing on major sports stories and events that occurred over the 30 years that the network had been on the air. While premiering to low ratings, awareness and critical reception of the series increased in later installments, leading to an increase in viewership. By the seventh episode, The U, the audience had grown to a 1.8 rating and well over 2 million viewers.

The most-watched program in the history of cable television was the 2011 BCS National Championship Game, which aired on January 10, 2011, earning a 17.8 ratings share and an audience of 27.3 million viewers in 17.7 million homes.

== International expansion ==
In the early 1990s, ESPN established a new division, ESPN International, to take advantage of the growing satellite markets in Asia, Africa and Latin America. ESPN would also purchase a minority stake in a consortium known as NetStar Communications, which was formed to acquire the Canadian sports networks TSN and RDS from Labatt, due to rules regarding the foreign ownership of television broadcasters in Canada, Labatt could no longer own TSN after its purchase by Interbrew. After the majority stake of TSN/RDS was sold to CTV (which in turn was acquired by Bell Globemedia in 2011), TSN adopted an ESPN-styled logo, and rebranded its sports news program as SportsCentre (a Canadian English version of SportsCenter). RDS, likewise, also adopted an ESPN-styled logo. Bell continues to own majority control and directly operate both TSN and RDS instead of ESPN because of the aforementioned Canadian rules on foreign ownership.

In 2004, ESPN entered the European market by launching a version of ESPN Classic, and then by acquiring the North American Sports Network (which was relaunched as ESPN America in February 2009). In August 2009, ESPN also launched a domestic channel for the United Kingdom and Ireland after acquiring domestic rights to 46 Barclays Premier League matches for the forthcoming season, and 23 matches each for the following three seasons. The deal replaced a previous contract with Setanta Sports GB, which was experiencing financial difficulties and bankruptcy.

== 2017 layoffs ==
On April 26, 2017, approximately 100 ESPN employees were notified that their position with the sports network had been terminated, among them athletes-turned-analysts Trent Dilfer and Danny Kanell, and noted journalists like NFL beat reporter Ed Werder and Major League Baseball expert Jayson Stark. The layoffs come as ESPN continues to shed viewers, more than 10 million over a period of several years, while forking over big money for the broadcast rights to such properties as the NFL, NBA and College Football Playoff. Further cost-cutting measures taken include moving the studio operations of ESPNU to Bristol from Charlotte, North Carolina, reducing its longtime MLB studio show Baseball Tonight to Sundays as a lead-in to the primetime game and adding the MLB Network-produced Intentional Talk to ESPN2's daily lineup.

== 2020–present ==
On March 11, 2020, the World Health Organization (WHO) declared the COVID-19 outbreak to be a pandemic. This declaration, along with sporting leagues having their players test positive for the disease, resulted in cancellations to almost all traditional sporting events globally over the next few weeks in the most severe disruption to the sporting calendar since World War II. Due to these circumstances, ESPN announced that it would undergo major changes to its programming schedule, opting to show replays of classic sporting events, sports documentaries, and expanded news programs.

After having last carried national-televised NHL games in 2004, ESPN and ABC agreed on a seven-year contract (agreed on March 10, 2021) to televise games, and will also air some games on ESPN+ and Hulu. The contract also stated that ABC will exclusively air four of the seven Stanley Cup Finals, marking the first time that the entirety of the Finals would air on broadcast television exclusively since 1980.

A week later, ESPN and the NFL agreed on a landmark ten-year contract (agreed on March 18, 2021) to continue televising Monday Night Football, and will also air games on ABC and ESPN+. Terms of this deal include: expanding the MNF schedule to 23 games, but ESPN will phase it into three steps. The schedule will expand from 17 games to 19 games in 2021, the last year of ESPN’s current eight-year agreement, to include two games during the final week of the season, as part of a new Saturday doubleheader to kick off the new Week 18 (both will have playoff implications and will be simulcast on ESPN and ABC). In 2022, which will be a bridge agreement year, the schedule expands to 21 games, to include two more exclusive games, one on ABC, the first one since 2005, and one on ESPN+, which will be an International game. Then in 2023, the first of the new ten-year agreement, two more games, both on ABC exclusively, will be added, to make the schedule 23 games. Other major terms include: continued rights for ESPN and ABC to air both the Pro Bowl and NFL Draft, flex scheduling rights from Week 12 on, typically used by the NFL’s other broadcast partners: CBS, Fox, NBC, and NFL Network, a Divisional playoff game, and the rights for ABC to air Super Bowls LXI and LXV, the first Super Bowls under the Disney/ESPN-NFL agreement, and ABC’s first Super Bowls since Super Bowl XL. ESPN also was allowed the rights to produce alternate broadcasts for select games. ESPN took advantage of this by teaming with Omaha Productions to produce the Manningcast, a ten-game alternate broadcast series hosted by Peyton and Eli Manning. ESPN later signed a five-year deal to be the home of the new Monday Night Super Wild Card Game, which included the Manningcast.

In December 2022, ESPN acquired the rights to Tony Stewart's Superstar Racing Experience (SRX) short-track stock car racing series beginning in the 2023 season. As part of the agreement, the events moved to Thursday nights, and ESPN revived its former Thursday Night Thunder branding for the telecasts. After poor viewership, SRX folded after that season.

On August 8, 2023, Penn Entertainment announced a licensing agreement with ESPN under which it would launch a sportsbook known as ESPN Bet. The sportsbook launched in November 2023 as a rebranding of Penn's previous Barstool Sportsbook operations; as part of the licensing agreement, ESPN Bet would replace DraftKings and Caesars Entertainment as the official daily fantasy sports and sports betting services of ESPN, and the service would be cross-promoted across ESPN television programming (including the ESPN2 studio show ESPN Bet Live) and digital content.

On February 6, 2024, ESPN announced a joint venture with Fox Sports and TNT Sports known as Venu Sports, including the three organizations' main linear sports channels and associated media rights. It was originally planned to launch in fall 2024. However, following legal issues (including an antitrust lawsuit by FuboTV), the service was ultimately cancelled.

In May 2025, ESPN announced that it would launch an ESPN direct-to-consumer product later that year; the service would be available in two tiers, including a "Select" tier corresponding to content formerly marketed under the ESPN+ branding, and "Unlimited"—which consists of content from the main ESPN linear networks, and streaming-only content (including content formerly marketed under brands such as ESPN3) that was formerly exclusive to authenticated television subscribers. ESPN stated that it aimed for the service to be the main streaming offering for all ESPN subscribers, and that it would—pending carriage negotiations—be available to subscribers via participating television providers. The service launched on August 21, 2025.

Alongside the DTC launch, ESPN also began to introduce a new brand system based around the characteristics of its existing logo, including elements using individual shapes from the logo, a standardized corporate red color, and the new corporate typeface "Ignite"—whose italic version shares the same seven-degree slant as the ESPN logo itself.

On November 6, 2025, Penn and ESPN announced that they would mutually end the ESPN Bet partnership in December 2025 due to the service's underperformance. At that time, Penn migrated ESPN Bet customers to theScore Bet, and ESPN entered into a sponsorship agreement with DraftKings.

In April 2026, ESPN premiered a documentary, "Sports Heaven: The Birth of ESPN", chronicling the channel's creation. This documentary tells the story of how Bill and Scott Rasmussen launched the network.

Its founder, Bill Rasmussen, died on August 18, 2026, at the age of 93, at his home in Florida, from complications of Parkinson's disease.

== 2023 layoffs ==
Numerous ESPN employees, including longtime SportsCenter anchor Neil Everett and radio host Max Kellerman were fired as part of the mass layoffs.

== Criticism ==
Despite its acclaim and notability, ESPN and its sister networks have been the targets of criticism for some of its programming. This criticism includes accusations of biased coverage, conflict of interest, and controversies about individual broadcasters and analysts' backgrounds and character.
