= Score Media and Gaming =

Canadian media company

Score Media and Gaming Inc.
- Company type: Subsidiary
- Industry: Media, Gaming
- Predecessor: Score Media
- Founded: 2012; 14 years ago
- Founder: John S. Levy
- Headquarters: 125 Queens Quay East, Toronto, Ontario, Canada
- Products: Digital media, mobile applications, sports betting
- Parent: Penn Entertainment (2021-present)
- Website: www.scoremediaandgaming.com

Score Media and Gaming Inc. (formerly theScore Inc.) is a Canadian digital media and gaming company based in Toronto. A subsidiary of Penn Entertainment, it operates the sports news application theScore and the sportsbook theScore Bet. The company maintains American offices in New York City.

The company was formed in 2012 as a spin-out of Score Media after the sale of its television business (including its specialty channel The Score Television Network, now Sportsnet 360) to Rogers Media.

== History ==
In 2012, Score Media reached an agreement to sell its Canadian television operations (including its flagship specialty channel The Score) to Rogers Media. The remaining digital assets, including theScore.ca and its mobile apps, were spun off into a new entity known as theScore Inc. The Canadian Radio-television and Telecommunications Commission (CRTC) approved the sale of the television business to Rogers in 2013.

The company was spun-out from Score Media immediately prior to Rogers' acquisition. As a result of the transaction, former shareholders of Score Media received one share of the new company for each share held in Score Media, meaning that Score Media founder John Levy and family are the largest single voting shareholders in the company, as was the case with Score Media, though Rogers received additional shares yielding an ownership stake of 11.8%. Rogers subsequently sold its shares in the company in June 2014.

In December 2018, following the legalization of sports betting in the United States via Murphy v. National Collegiate Athletic Association, theScore partnered with Monmouth Park Racetrack in Oceanport, New Jersey to launch its first mobile sportsbook in the United States via a 15-year market access agreement. The service launched in September 2019 as theScore Bet; the service would focus on integrations with theScore's sports news app.

In July 2019, Penn National Gaming announced a 20-year market access agreement with the company, now known as Score Media and Gaming, in 11 states; as a condition of the deal, subsidiary Penn Interactive Ventures would take a 4.7% equity stake in the company.

The company was publicly traded on the TSX Venture Exchange; in September 2020, it moved to the Toronto Stock Exchange. In October 2021, Penn acquired theScore for $2 billion in a cash and stock deal; the company was subsequently delisted from the Toronto Stock Exchange and Nasdaq.

In April 2022, as part of the province's regulated online gambling market, theScore Bet expanded into Canada by launching in Ontario. It would subsequently announce a partnership with the Toronto Blue Jays (which are also owned by Rogers) to become its official gaming partner.

In December 2025, theScore Bet subsumed the customer base of Penn's ESPN Bet (a short-lived licensing partnership with U.S. sports channel ESPN), expanding the brand to 21 U.S. states. In April 2026, Score Media and Gaming received approval from the province of Alberta to participate in its regulated online gambling market.

== Leadership ==
The executive chairman of theScore is its founder, John Levy. The president and chief operating officer of theScore is Benjie Levy.
