= Amerant Bank Arena =

Indoor arena in Sunrise, Florida, U.S.

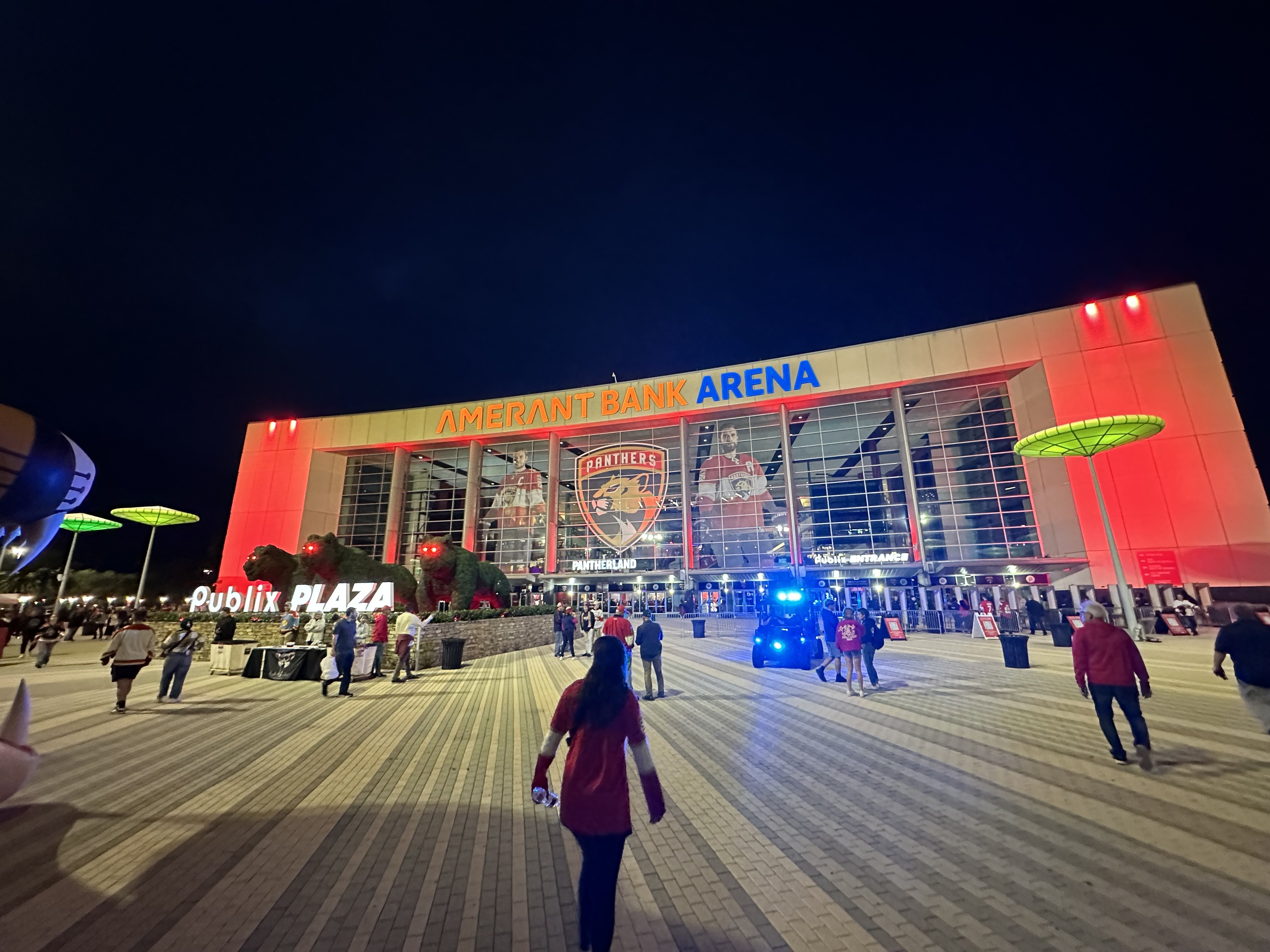
- Amerant Bank Arena in 2024

- Location in Florida Location in the United States
- Former names: National Car Rental Center (1998–2002); Office Depot Center (2002–2005); BankAtlantic Center (2005–2012); BB&T Center (2012–2021); FLA Live Arena (2021–2023)
- Address: 1 Panther Parkway
- Location: Sunrise, Florida, U.S.
- Coordinates: 26°9′30″N 80°19′32″W
- Owner: Broward County, Florida
- Operator: Arena Operating Company, Ltd.
- Capacity: Basketball: 20,737; Concerts: 23,000; Ice hockey: 19,250 (at least 20,000 with standing room); Theatre: 3,000
- Field size: 872,000 sq ft (81,000 m^{2})
- Parking: 7,045 total spaces

Construction
- Groundbreaking: November 8, 1996
- Opened: October 3, 1998
- Cost: US$184 million ($380 million in 2025 dollars)
- Architect: Ellerbe Becket
- Project managers: Upton & Partners
- Structural engineer: Walter P. Moore & Associates
- General contractor: Arena Development Company (A joint venture of Centex Rooney/Huber, Hunt & Nichols/Morse Diesel)

Tenants
- Florida Panthers (NHL) (1998–present); Florida ThunderCats (NPSL) (1998–1999); Florida Bobcats (AFL) (1999–2001); Florida Pit Bulls (ABA) (2005–2006); Miami Caliente (LFL) (2009–2010); Florida Freedom (PBR) (2024–present); Florida Flamingos (WTT) (2026-present)

Website
- amerantbankarena.com

Amerant Bank Arena is a multi-purpose indoor arena in Sunrise, Florida, United States. It is the home venue for the Florida Panthers of the National Hockey League. It was completed in 1998, at a cost of US$185 million, almost entirely publicly financed, and features 70 suites and 2,623 club seats.

== History ==
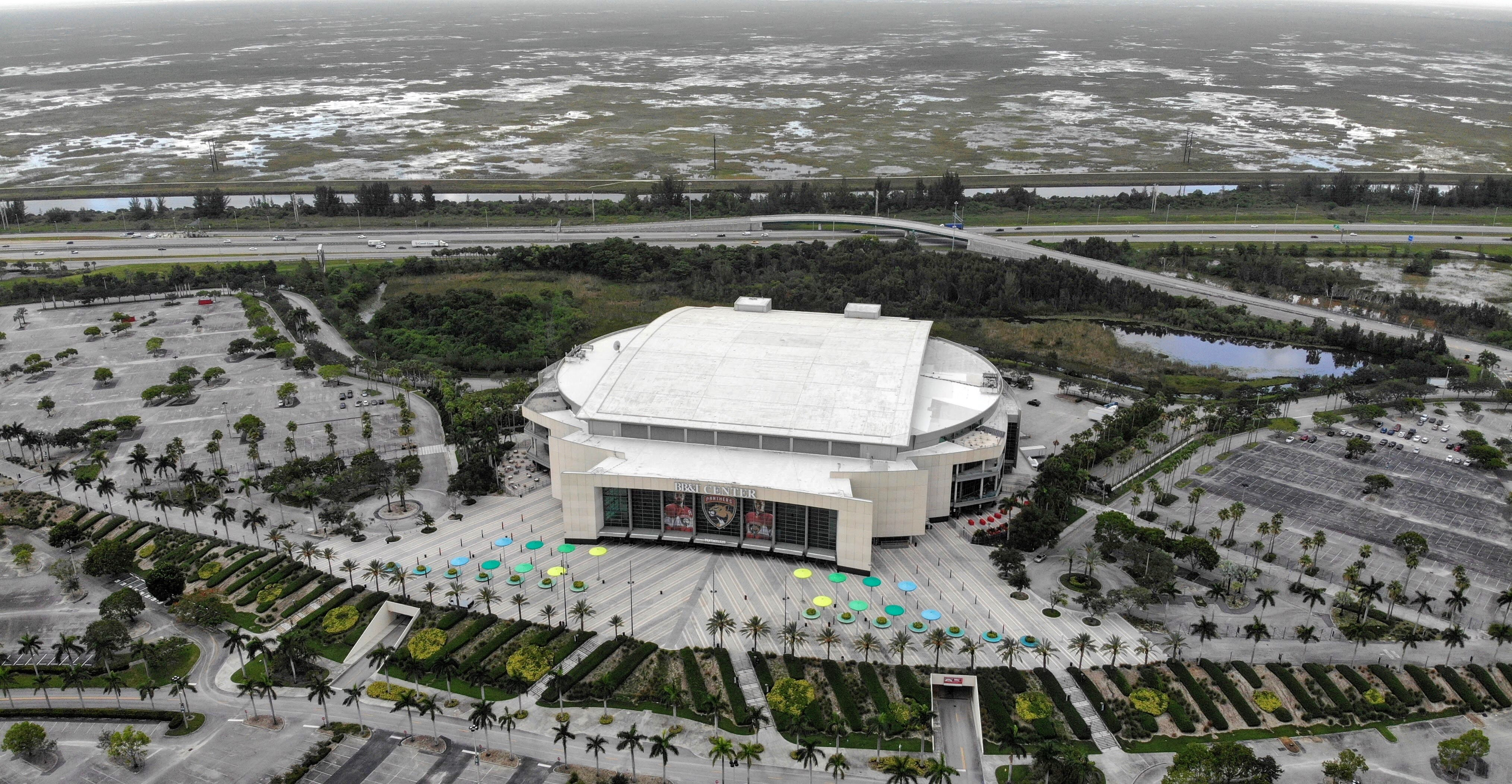
An aerial shot of Amerant Bank Arena (then BB&T Center)

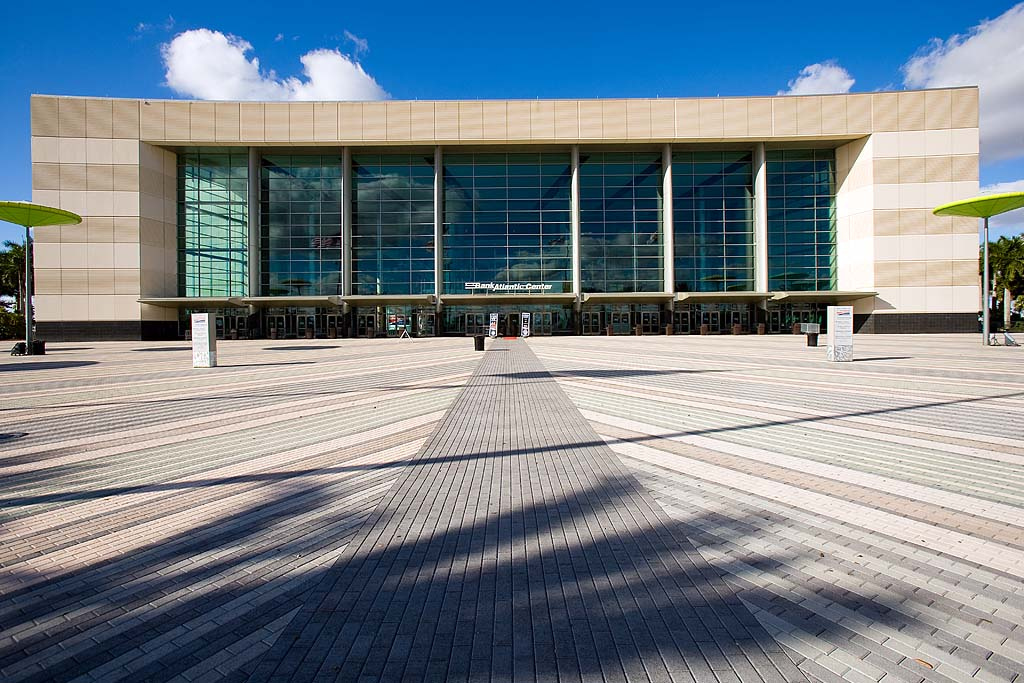
View of Amerant Bank Arena (then BankAtlantic Center) from entrance plaza (now called Publix Plaza) before a Florida Panthers game during the 2007–08 season.

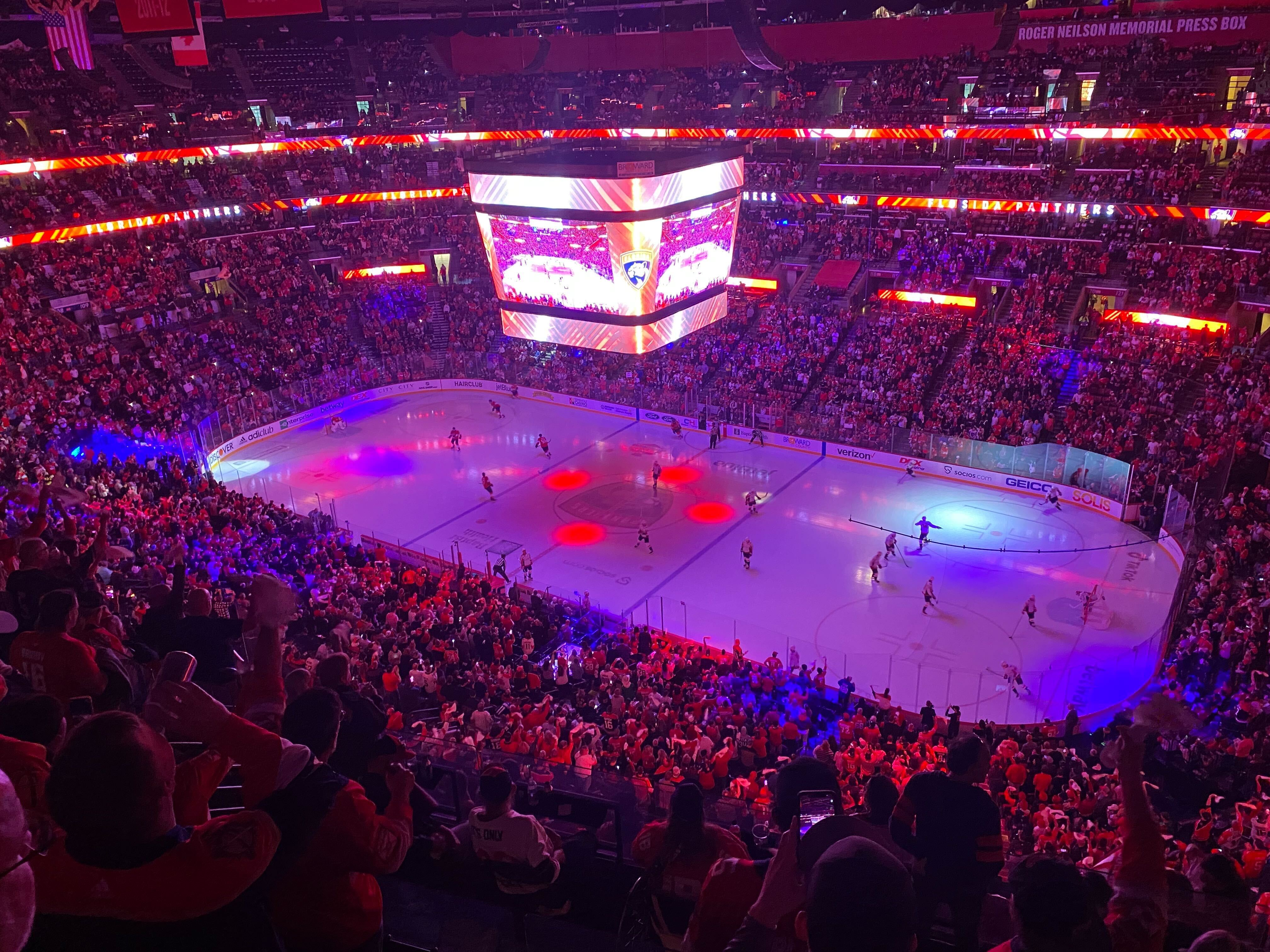
Amerant Bank Arena before a Florida Panthers playoff game

In 1992, Wayne Huizenga obtained a new NHL franchise that would eventually become the Florida Panthers. Until the team had an arena of their own, they initially played at the now-demolished Miami Arena, sharing the venue with the NBA's Miami Heat. Sunrise City Manager Pat Salerno made public a $167-million financing and construction plan for a civic center near the Sawgrass Expressway in December 1995, and Broward County approved construction in February 1996. In June 1996, the site was chosen by the Panthers, and in July, Alex Muxo gathered more than a dozen architects, engineers and contractors for the first major design brainstorming session. Architects Ellerbe Becket were given 26 months to build the arena, which had to be ready by August 30, 1998, to accommodate the 1998–99 NHL season. Despite never having designed a facility that had taken less than 31 months from start to finish, they accepted the job. Seventy suites were completed with wet bars, closed circuit monitors and leather upholstery. Also home to private lounge box seating, all construction activity was generated by over fifty subcontractors and 2.3 million man hours without a single injury. Known as the Broward County Civic Center during construction, the naming rights were won in July 1998 by National Car Rental — a company purchased by Huizenga in January 1997 — leading to the venue being named the National Car Rental Center. A certificate of occupancy was given on September 12, 1998, and the arena opened on October 3, 1998, with a Celine Dion concert. The next day, Elton John performed, and on October 9, 1998, the Florida Panthers had their first home game at their new arena, a 4–1 win against their cross-state rival, The Tampa Bay Lightning.

As NRC's new parent company, ANC Rental, went bankrupt in 2002, the Panthers sought a new sponsor for the arena. It became the Office Depot Center in the summer of 2002 (Office Depot is based in nearby Boca Raton). Just over three years later, the arena's name changed again; it became the BankAtlantic Center on September 6, 2005 (BankAtlantic was headquartered in nearby Fort Lauderdale). After BB&T acquired BankAtlantic in July 2012, the arena was rebranded as the BB&T Center.

In October 2012, Sunrise Sports and Entertainment completed installation of the Club Red [now Amerant Vault] which is a 12,000+ square-foot exclusive lounge for concerts, shows, and events including a center ice view for hockey games.

On May 14, 2013, Broward County voted to fund a new scoreboard for the county-owned arena. On October 11, 2013, the scoreboard made its debut for the Panthers' 2013–14 home opener.

In February 2019, it was announced that BB&T would be merging with SunTrust Banks to form Truist Financial Corporation. The merged company decided to not renew the naming rights agreement after it expired in 2021. The arena was temporary named FLA Live Arena until a new rights partner was found. On September 19, 2023, it was announced that Amerant Bank, a South Florida-based bank, would be the new rights partner, renaming the arena to Amerant Bank Arena.

The arena is currently the largest in Florida.

== Notable events ==
=== NHL ===
- The Florida Panthers hosted the 2001 NHL entry draft & 2015 NHL entry draft at the arena.
- The arena served as the site for the 2003 NHL All-Star Game on February 2, 2003. The Western Conference defeated the Eastern Conference 6–5 in a shootout victory. It marked the first "official" shootout in the NHL.
- The arena was due to host the 2021 NHL All-Star game, but it was cancelled due to the COVID-19 pandemic.
- The arena hosted the 2023 NHL All-Star Game on February 4, 2023.
- The arena hosted the third and fourth games of the 2023 Stanley Cup Final.
- The arena hosted the first, second, fifth and seventh games of the 2024 Stanley Cup Final, with the final game resulting in the Panthers clinching the Stanley Cup.
- The arena hosted the third, fourth, and sixth games of the 2025 Stanley Cup Final, with the final game resulting in the Panthers clinching the Stanley Cup again.

=== PWHL ===
- The arena will host a Professional Women's Hockey League game on March 13, 2027 between the Detroit Clutch and Seattle Torrent.

=== Latin/Hispanic shows ===
- Sunrise and Fort Lauderdale are a growing Latin & Hispanic market as demand has grown outside of Miami proper. Amerant Bank Arena is centrally located in South Florida to be able to not only draw from Miami-Dade county but the one million Hispanic/Latin population residing in points north in Broward County and Palm Beach County. This is evidenced by the growth in Latin programming since 2019 at Amerant Bank Arena including but not limited to hosting the Latin Billboard Music Awards in 2020, Latin American Music Awards in 2021, Amor A La Musica in 2022 and 2023, and Uforia Mix Live in 2022.
- Marco Antonio Solís sold out to set the Latin gross revenue record in April 2022 and then beat his own record on April 1, 2023. Just three weeks after Marco eclipsed his record, Juan Luis Guerra set a new Latin ticket sales and gross record selling out on April 22, 2023.
- The Latin/Hispanic programming continued to grow with a sold-out Peso Pluma concert in June and a strong showing by Santa Fe Klan in July 2023. The future of Latin programming in the northern part of South Florida includes performances scheduled by Luis Miguel, Pepe Aguilar, and others.

=== Boxing, mixed martial arts ===
The arena has held boxing and mixed martial arts events such as EliteXC: Heat featuring the main event of Seth Petruzelli and Kimbo Slice took place on October 4, 2008. On February 15, 2009, a lightweight bout between Nate Campbell and Ali Funeka took place in the arena.

Strikeforce MMA made their debut at the arena on January 30, 2010, with the Strikeforce: Miami event on Showtime.

UFC on FX 3 took place at the arena on June 8, 2012. It was the first UFC event ever held at the arena.

UFC Fight Night: Jacaré vs. Hermansson (also known as UFC Fight Night 150 or UFC on ESPN+ 8) took place at the arena on April 27, 2019. It was the first time UFC returned to the arena since 2012.

The arena hosted an exhibition boxing match between Floyd Mayweather Jr. and John Gotti III, on June 11, 2023.

On January 10, 2026, Real American Freestyle presented RAF 05 from the arena, an event that was broadcast live on Fox Nation.

=== Professional wrestling ===
- WCW Monday Nitro - November 2, 1998
- WWF Raw Is War - May 11, 1999
- WCW Bash At The Beach - July 11, 1999
- WWF Armageddon – December 12, 1999
- WWF Raw Is War - April 10, 2000
- WWF SmackDown - July 6, 2000
- WWF SmackDown - November 23, 2000
- WWE Armageddon – December 15, 2002
- WWE Raw – January 10, 2005
- WWE Raw – November 19, 2007
- WWE SmackDown - February 19, 2015
- AEW Dynamite - April 26, 2023
- WWE Raw – August 19, 2024
- WWE SmackDown - February 20, 2026
- WWE SmackDown - November 13, 2026

=== Bull riding ===
- The Professional Bull Riders (PBR) brought their Built Ford Tough Series (BFTS) tour to the BB&T Center in September 2005 for a bull riding event, which was won by Kody Lostroh (who ultimately became the PBR Rookie of the Year that same year).
- Every August since 2024, the Florida Freedom PBR bull riding team host an annual event at the arena.

=== Other events ===
- On May 23, 2008, Senator Barack Obama held a rally as part of his presidential primary campaign.
- Several months later on October 29, Obama returned to the arena to hold a rally as part of his presidential campaign. The rally was presented as a paid program airing on several major broadcast and cable networks live.
- On August 10, 2016, Candidate Donald Trump held a rally as part of his presidential campaign.
- On February 21, 2018, the venue hosted a CNN town hall meeting on gun control in response to the Stoneman Douglas High School shooting that occurred a week earlier; it was attended by 7,000 people, including survivors of the shooting and relatives of the victims.
- On June 27, 2018, rapper XXXTentacion's fan memorial and public funeral was held at the arena.
- On November 26, 2019, President Donald Trump held a campaign rally.

== Regular events ==
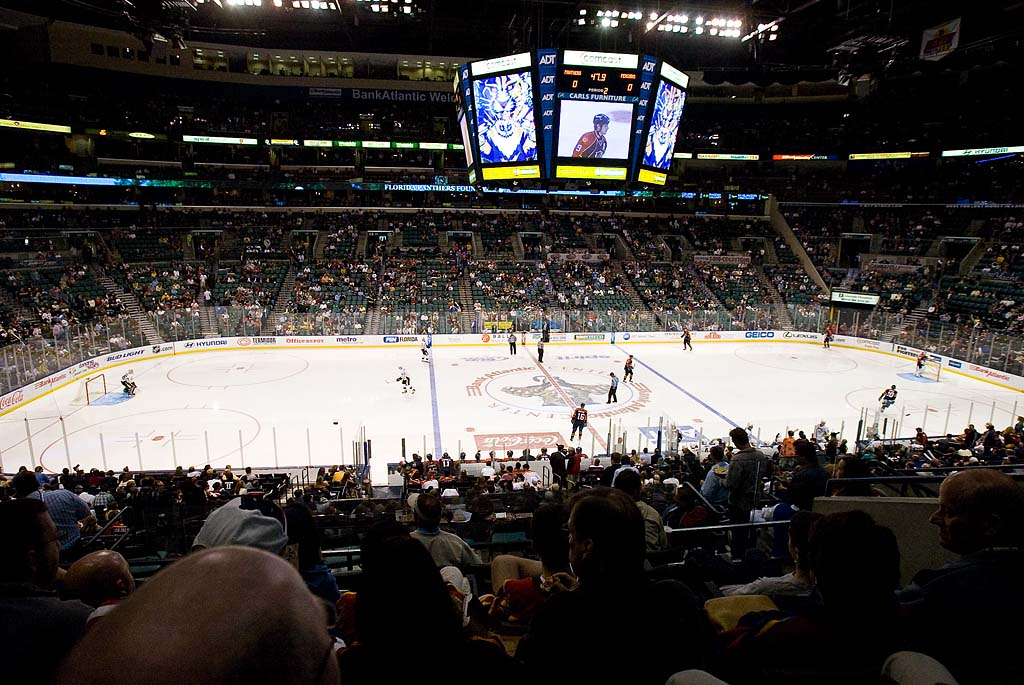
Inside the then-named Bank Atlantic Center during a Florida Panthers game in 2008

In addition to the Panthers, the arena was formerly home to the Florida Pit Bulls of the American Basketball Association, the Miami Caliente of the Lingerie Football League, and the Florida Bobcats of the AFL, along with the only season of the Florida ThunderCats. This arena also serves as the host for the annual Orange Bowl Basketball Classic held every December in conjunction with the namesake college football game.

== Arena information ==
=== Seating capacity ===
- Concerts: 23,000
- Basketball: 20,737
- Ice hockey: 19,250
- Theatre: 3,000

=== Dimensions ===
- 17,000 square feet (1,600 m^{2}) of arena floor space for trade shows and other events such as circuses and ice shows.

=== Parking and loading docks ===
- Total: 7,045 spaces (Does not include production or bus/oversized vehicle parking)
- General parking: 4,446 Spaces
- Suite/club seat parking: 1,771 spaces
- Garage: 226 spaces
- Disabled parking: 92 spaces
- Truck doors: 5
- Waste removal docks: 2

=== Food and novelty concessions ===
Plaza Level:

- 3 Coca-Cola food courts
- Pantherland Retail
- VooDoo Ranger Craft Beer & Bar
- Cats Cantina
- Funky Buddha Tap Room
- Jameson Crossbar
- Patron Patio &Yuengling Flight Deck & Bar

Mezzanine Level:

- 3 food courts and two points of purchase kiosks

== See also ==
- List of indoor arenas by capacity

Events and tenants
Preceded by Miami Arena	Home of the Florida Panthers; 1998–present	Succeeded by current
Preceded by Staples Center; T-Mobile Arena	Host of the NHL All-Star Game; 2003; 2023	Succeeded by Xcel Energy Center; Scotiabank Arena
