= ESPN Bet Live =

- Also known as: Daily Wager
- Genre: Sports talk Panel show
- Presented by: Doug Kezirian
- Country of origin: United States
- Original language: English

Production
- Production location: Bristol, Connecticut
- Running time: 60 minutes (with commercials)

Original release
- Network: ESPN2
- Release: March 11, 2019 – November 30, 2025

ESPN Bet Live (formerly Daily Wager) is an American sports betting discussion program, that was broadcast by ESPN2 on Thursday, Friday, and Monday evenings, and Saturday and Sunday mornings. Hosted by Doug Kezirian, it features sports news and analysis presented from the perspective of sports betting.

From September 2020 through November 2023, the program was broadcast from ESPN's Las Vegas studio at The Linq as part of a sponsorship with Caesars Entertainment. On November 10, 2023, the program was rebranded as ESPN Bet Live, co-branded with Penn Entertainment's then newly-launched sportsbook ESPN Bet; at this point, the program returned to ESPN's studios in Bristol, Connecticut. The program went on indefinite hiatus in December 2025 after ESPN and Penn mutually ended the ESPN Bet venture.

== History ==
Daily Wager premiered on ESPNews on March 11, 2019; its premiere came amid the widening legalization of sports betting in the United States after the 2018 repeal of the Professional and Amateur Sports Protection Act of 1992 by Murphy v. National Collegiate Athletic Association. It would be hosted by ESPN sports betting analyst Doug Kezirian, with "Stanford" Steve Coughlin (host of the "Bad Beats" segment on SportsCenter with Scott Van Pelt), Joe Fortenbaugh, Tyler Fulghum, and Anita Marks among others as regular contributors.

In May 2019, ESPN announced a partnership with Caesars Entertainment, under which Caesars Sportsbook would serve as the data provider for its sports betting content, and ESPN would construct a 6,000 sq ft (560 m^{2}) Las Vegas studio at The Linq casino hotel for Daily Wager and other sports betting-oriented content. In August 2019, it was announced that Daily Wager would move to ESPN2 beginning August 20, 2019, and add a new Sunday morning edition ahead of NFL season. At this time, betting lines from Caesars Sportsbook began to be displayed on an "L-bar" during Daily Wager, and on ESPNews during non-event programming.

In September 2020, Daily Wager began broadcasting from The Linq. On April 14, 2021, Daily Wager presented a special alternate feed of an NBA game between the Brooklyn Nets and Philadelphia 76ers on ESPN2, which featured discussion and on-screen graphics highlighting odds, props, and futures relating to the game and the league. It was hosted by Kezirian, Fortenbaugh, and Fulghum from The Linq, joined by NBA on ESPN analyst Kendrick Perkins.

In August 2023, ESPN announced a licensing agreement with Penn Entertainment to relaunch its Barstool Sports-branded sports betting services as ESPN Bet. As this would end ESPN's agreement with Caesars, it was announced that the Las Vegas studio would close, and that Daily Wager would move back to ESPN's headquarters in Bristol, Connecticut beginning September 7. It was also announced that the program would add a Saturday morning edition, and adopt a new Thursday–Monday schedule. On November 10, ahead of the service's launch on November 14, Daily Wager was rebranded as ESPN Bet Live. For the 2024 NFL draft in Detroit, the show broadcast on-location from the newly-opened ESPN Bet sportsbook at Hollywood Casino at Greektown on April 25 and 26.

In November 2025, Penn and ESPN announced that they would mutually end the ESPN Bet joint venture in December 2025, and ESPN would enter into a new agreement with DraftKings to become the new official sports betting partner of the network. In December 2025, ESPN Bet Live went on indefinite hiatus; the network stated that the program would return in a "reimagined" form at a later date.
