= Wet bar =

Small bar for mixing alcoholic beverages

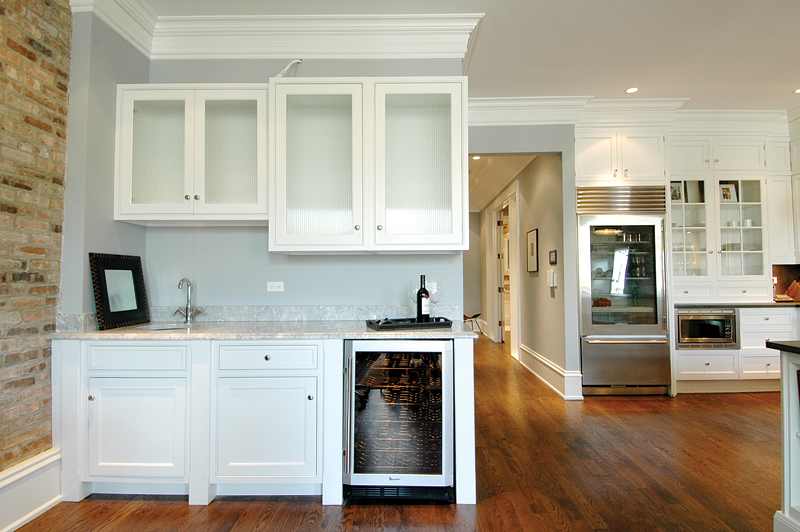
A wet bar with a bar fridge adjoining a kitchen

A wet bar is a small bar used for mixing and serving alcoholic beverages that includes a sink with running water, as opposed to a "dry bar" that does not include a sink. A wet bar can increase the rate at which drinks are served because of the sink, which allows for glasses to be cleaned immediately. The sink may also be used for cleaning glassware as well as spills that may happen.

Wet bars are found in homes for entertainment purposes. Near a kitchen or in a finished basement are some typical locations for a wet bar. Wet bars are relatively simple to build, and, thus, many homeowners have turned the wet bar into a do-it-yourself project.
