= Amerant Bank =

American bank

Amerant Bank N.A.
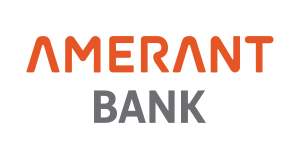
- Company type: Public company
- Traded as: NYSE: AMTB
- Industry: Banking; Investment banking; Financial services
- Founded: 1979; 47 years ago
- Headquarters: Coral Gables, Florida, U.S.
- Key people: Carlos Iafigliola (President & CEO); Sharymar Calderon, CFO
- Products: Consumer banking, Corporate banking, Private banking, Financial analysis, Insurance, Investment banking, Mortgage loans, Private equity, Wealth management, Credit cards
- Net income: ▼ -$15.8 million (2024)
- Total assets: ▲$10.4 billion (2024)
- Total equity: ▲$890.5 million (2024)
- Number of employees: 692 (2023)
- Website: amerantbank.com

Amerant Bank is an American bank based in Coral Gables, Florida that is chartered in Florida, with 19 branches in Florida and 55,000 automated teller machines either operating directly or through a network of ATMs.

It is the main subsidiary of Amerant Bancorp Inc., a bank holding company and comprises subsidiaries Amerant Investments Inc., Amerant Mortgage, LLC and Elant Bank & Trust Ltd. As of September 2023, it was the largest community bank in Florida and the 7th largest bank in Florida by total assets. It was formerly known as Mercantil Bank and was officially rebranded as Amerant in October 2018.

In October of 2024, Amerant Bank surpassed $10B in assets, becoming the third regional bank based in the tri-county area.

== History ==
=== Early years ===
Amerant Bank was founded in 1979 as Commercebank N.A. In 1987, the bank was acquired by Mercantil Servicios Financieros (MSF) – ranked as one of the world's biggest 2,000 public companies according to Forbes magazine (2015) at 648th place – and operated as Commercebank until it became known as Mercantil Commercebank in 2007. In September 1979, it was chartered as a national banking association. To reflect its positioning within the U.S. market, the company announced it was rebranding as Amerant in October 2018, just before launching its IPO. The company officially changed its corporate name to Amerant at its annual shareholder's meeting in 2019.

=== Growth ===
In June 2022, Amerant established a new commercial bank presence in the Greater Tampa Bay, Florida market with the opening of a commercial banking office with the goal of providing transactional and business-related services. Mid-2023 the company moved from NASDAQ and its stock began trading on the NYSE. Amerant Bank was named the best bank for fee avoidance in Florida with minimal to no fees for common transactions historically charged within the industry.

The bank has partnered with several US-based professional sports teams since 2022, including the NBA's Miami Heat and the NHL's Florida Panthers as well as colleges including the University of Miami and Rice University in Houston, Texas. The bank has also partnered with local colleges on training financial literacy and skills.

On September 19, 2023, it was announced that Amerant Bank, would be the new rights partner for the formerly known FLA Live Arena, renaming the arena to Amerant Bank Arena.

In November of 2024, Amerant Bank completed the sale of its Houston, Texas banking operations and branches to MidFirst Bank, a regional bank based in Oklahoma City, Oklahoma. The sale consisted of approximately $573.9M in deposits and $479.2M in loans.

=== Industry changes ===
During the 2008 financial crisis, the bank chose not to accept government assistance through the Troubled Asset Relief Program. The bank also largely was unaffected during 2023 United States banking crisis as its deposits were heavily diversified and the majority was insured through the United States' FDIC program.

== Sponsorships ==
Amerant Bank was named as an official sponsor of the Florida Beach Bowl which highlighted historically black colleges and universities in an American College Football bowl game.

== Naming rights ==
Amerant Bank owns corporate naming rights to the following:

- Amerant Bank Arena in Sunrise, Florida, home of the Stanley Cup champion Florida Panthers of the National Hockey League.
