= Hollywood Casino Greektown =

Casino and hotel in the United States

Coordinates: 42.33447°N 83.04117°W

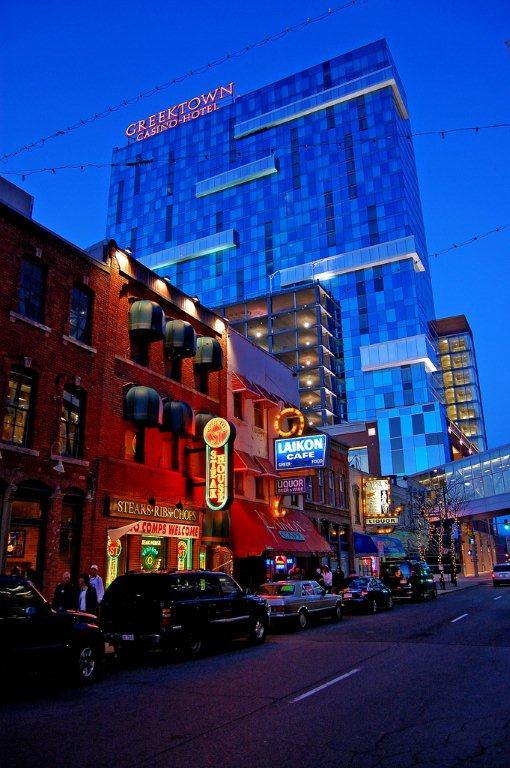
- Casino hotel skyscraper in Greektown in November 2011
- Interactive map of Hollywood Casino Greektown
- Location: 555 East Lafayette Street Detroit, Michigan
- Opened: November 10, 2000; 25 years ago (casino); November 15, 2007; 18 years ago (hotel tower)
- Theme: Detroit
- No. of rooms: 400
- Gaming space: 100,000 sq ft (9,300 m^{2})
- Notable restaurants: Prism; Barstool Sportsbook; Rock Bar
- Casino type: Land-based
- Owner: Vici Properties
- Operating license holder: Penn Entertainment
- Architect: Paul Steelman (casino); Rossetti (hotel)
- Previous names: Greektown Casino-Hotel (2000–2022)
- Renovated in: 2017–2018
- Public transit access: Greektown; DDOT 5, 52
- Website: Official website

Hollywood Casino Greektown, formerly Greektown Casino-Hotel, is a casino hotel in the Greektown neighborhood in Detroit, Michigan. It is owned by Vici Properties and operated by Penn Entertainment.

The casino opened in 2000, under the majority ownership of the Sault Ste. Marie Tribe of Chippewa Indians. It was the only casino in Detroit controlled by a Native American tribe. In 2008, during the Great Recession, the casino went into bankruptcy and was sold.

Hollywood Casino is one of three casinos in the city; there is also a casino in nearby Windsor, Ontario. Detroit is one of the largest American cities to offer casino hotels.

== History and development ==
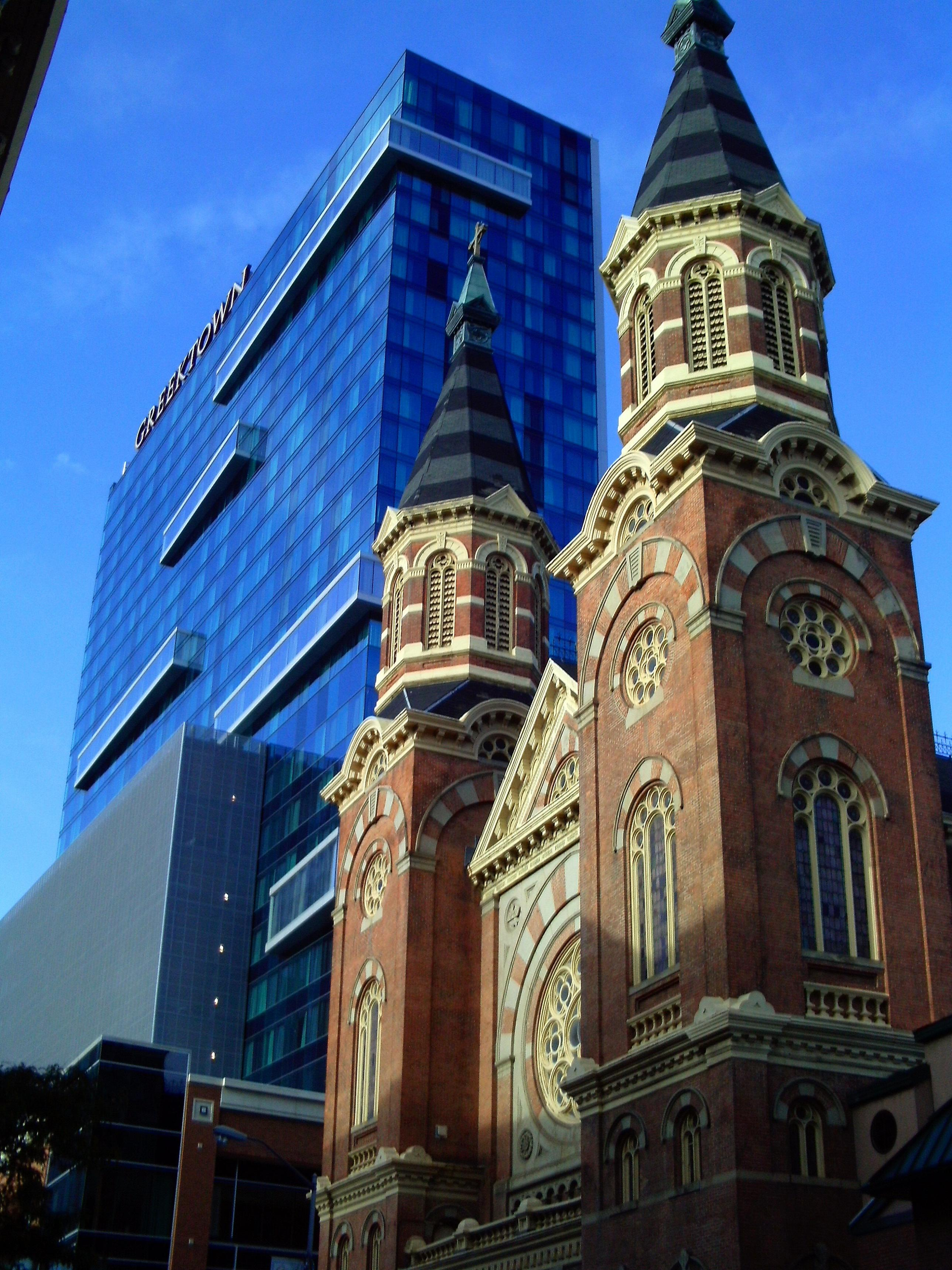
Greektown Historic District

Shortly after the enactment of the federal Indian Gaming Regulatory Act (IGRA) in 1988, the Sault Tribe of Chippewa Indians began working with local developers Ted Gatzaros and Jim Papas to open a casino in Detroit. In November 1992, they announced their plan publicly. Under the plan, Gatzaros and Papas's company, 400 Monroe Associates, would donate a 0.7-acre (0.28 ha) parcel of land in Greektown to become part of the tribe's reservation, and the tribe would build and operate the casino.

Detroit voters approved an advisory referendum in favor of the casino in August 1994, as well as another casino proposed to be built at Atwater Street. The plan was approved by the Secretary of the Interior later that month. However, it also needed approval from Michigan Governor John Engler, because the IGRA required gubernatorial approval for gaming on lands added to a tribe's reservation after 1988. Engler rejected the casino, citing potential proliferation of off-reservation casinos throughout the state.

The tribe next turned to the ballot initiative process. They partnered with the Atwater group to sponsor the Michigan Gaming Control and Revenue Act. This law would allow up to three private, commercially operated casinos to be opened in Detroit. It included a preference for proposals that had already been approved by Detroit voters, making the Greektown and Atwater projects the "presumptive choices" for two of the casino licenses. The petition drive and election campaign were financed almost entirely by the Sault Tribe and Atwater. Michigan voters approved the law in November 1996.

The Greektown casino was one of eleven applications submitted to Detroit mayor Dennis Archer. The $567-million proposal would include a temporary casino to open in 1998, followed by a permanent casino opening in 2000 with 128,170 square feet (11,907 m^{2}) of gaming space and 1,000 hotel rooms. The temporary casino was designed by architect Paul Steelman. It would be managed by the Las Vegas-based Millennium Management Group. In December 1997, Archer selected the Greektown proposal, along with the Atwater project (ultimately opened as MotorCity Casino Hotel) and the proposed MGM Grand Detroit.

Construction of the casino began in January 1999. It incorporated Trappers Alley, a vacant shopping center owned by Gatzaros and Papas, together with a new building. Costs of the casino, originally estimated at $115 million, increased to $200 million.

Ownership of the casino was to be split with 50 percent owned by the Sault Tribe, 40 percent by Gatzaros and Papas and their wives, and 10 percent by a group of local black investors. However, gaming regulators found problems during Gatzaros and Papas's background checks, and they were effectively forced to sell their shares. Negotiations were held with potential buyers including Millennium Management, Harrah's Entertainment, MGM Grand, and Park Place Entertainment. Advanced talks were held on selling the shares to a group of union pension funds. Ultimately, the tribe bought out the Gatzaroses and Papases' shares for $275 million, to be paid over 10 years. The casino licensing was approved in September 2000, with the tribe owning a 90 percent stake.

The Greektown Casino opened on November 10, 2000, following the two other casinos that opened the previous year.

The tribe ended its management deal with Millennium in 2002 and assumed direct control of the casino.

Development of the city's permanent casinos was delayed for years by protracted negotiations over the casinos' locations, and by a lawsuit over the constitutionality of the casino licensing process. In 2002, Greektown agreed with the city to build its $450-million permanent facility on an 8-acre (3.2 ha) site at Interstate 375 and Gratiot Avenue. In 2005, however, Greektown announced that it would expand at its current location instead of building a new facility. The $200-million expansion would include a 400-room hotel, a parking garage, convention space, and more gaming space.

In June 2006, site preparation began for the hotel. A city-owned parking garage was demolished to make way for redevelopment. Construction began in October 2006. The hotel tower rises 344 ft. (105 m.) with 30 floors. It opened November 15, 2007, and included a new 13-story, 3,500-space, free parking garage. In November 2008, 25,000 square feet (2,300 m^{2}) of additional gaming space was completed and opened over Lafayette. Total gaming space comprised 100,000 square feet (9,300 m^{2}). An expanded and re-designed VIP gaming area opened in February 2009. In November 2009, 25,000 square feet (2,300 m^{2}) of convention space opened with a newly designed poker room.

=== Changes in ownership ===
By late 2007, the casino was in financial trouble, as its debt-to-equity ratio fell below the minimum threshold negotiated with the lenders who financed the expansion. The state threatened to force a sale unless the casino could obtain new financing. In May 2008, Greektown Casino filed for Chapter 11 bankruptcy protection to prevent the forced sale.

In 2009, Randy Fine was the chief executive officer of the Greektown Casino. In June 2010, a group of Greektown's bondholders, organized as Greektown Superholdings, Inc., bought the casino out of bankruptcy. John Hancock Financial, OppenheimerFunds, Brigade Capital, and Solus Alternative Asset Management together owned 78% of the company.

Rock Gaming, owned by Dan Gilbert, agreed in January 2013 to buy a majority stake in the Greektown Casino. This was part of Gilbert's plan of investment to help revitalize downtown Detroit.

In February 2016, it was announced as part of Rock Gaming's rebranding as Jack Entertainment that the property would be renamed to Jack Detroit Casino–Hotel Greektown. Plans for the name change were canceled in March 2018, as Gilbert was planning to sell the property and exit the casino business.

In May 2019, Vici Properties and Penn National Gaming (now Penn Entertainment) jointly bought Greektown from Jack Entertainment. Vici paid $700 million for the real estate assets, while Penn National paid $300 million for the operating business. It leased the property from Vici for $56 million per year. In December 2020, a new Barstool Sportsbook was opened on the second floor, offering sports betting and dining.

In May 2022, the casino was rebranded under Penn's Hollywood Casino brand. In April 2024, the casino's sportsbook was relaunched as the ESPN Bet sportsbook, coinciding with the 2024 NFL draft; it was Penn's first retail sportsbook under the new branding.

== See also ==
- Caesars Windsor
- Greektown Detroit People Mover station
- Wikimedia graph of Detroit's casino revenues
- List of tallest buildings in Detroit
- List of integrated resorts
