= TheScore Bet =

Canadian sports betting company

theScore Bet
- Type: Subsidiary
- Industry: Sports betting
- Founded: September 2019; 7 years ago
- Owner: Score Media and Gaming
- Parent: Penn Entertainment
- Website: thescore.bet

theScore Bet is a Canadian multinational sportsbook owned by Score Media and Gaming, a subsidiary of Penn Entertainment. Established in 2019, it offers sports betting in 21 U.S. states and the Canadian provinces of Alberta and Ontario. The name derives from the former television channel of the same name, which was acquired by Rogers Media in 2012 along with the assets of Score Media and rebranded to Sportsnet 360 in 2013.

In Ontario and four U.S. states, Penn also operates online casinos, branded as theScore Casino and Hollywood Casino Online.

== History ==
In May 2018, the U.S. Supreme Court struck down the Professional and Amateur Sports Protection Act of 1992—an act that largely outlawed sports betting in the United States —in Murphy v. National Collegiate Athletic Association. theScore founder John S. Levy felt that the decision opened up new possibilities for the company, telling The Globe and Mail that "we’d had discussions before PASPA fell, because it had been in our minds forever. We'd thought about going to Europe and doing something over there. Once PASPA fell, it became real in a hurry."

The company entered into an agreement with Bet.Works to provide middleware for the service. Bet.Works referred theScore to Dennis Drazin, the manager of the Monmouth Park Racetrack in Oceanport, New Jersey. In December 2018, theScore would enter into a market access agreement in New Jersey with the track's parent company Darby Development, allowing it to offer mobile sports betting in the state. With the deal, theScore became the first media company to establish or partner with a U.S. sportsbook. In July 2019, The Score entered into a 20-year market access agreement with Penn National Gaming, which allowed theScore to operate sports betting in 11 more states. As part of the agreement, Penn took a 4.7% stake in the company, which was renamed Score Media and Gaming.

theScore Bet officially launched in New Jersey in September 2019; alongside the launch, theScore's sports news app added a new feature known as "Bet Mode", which enables sports betting-oriented features including real-time statistics, odds, and tracking, and the ability to prepare wagers that can then be forwarded to theScore Bet's app.

In August 2021, Penn agreed to acquire Score Media and Gaming for $2 billion in cash and stocks, with theScore Bet operating alongside its Barstool Sportsbook brand. In April 2022, theScore Bet launched in Ontario as part of the province's new regulated online gambling market, becoming its first Canadian jurisdiction. It also announced an agreement to become the official gaming partner of the Toronto Blue Jays (owned by Rogers Sports & Media, which had acquired theScore's original Canadian television operations in 2012).

In November 2023, theScore Bet became an official sports betting service of the National Hockey League in Canada as part of its deal with Penn.

In November 2025, Penn and ESPN Inc. announced that they had mutually agreed to end their licensing agreement for the ESPN Bet sportsbook in the United States. On December 1, 2025, ESPN Bet customers were transitioned to theScore Bet. The service also launched in Missouri the same day, expanding its reach to 21 U.S. states. Penn CEO Jay Snowden stated that the cost savings from ending the ESPN deal would largely be reinvested into its Canadian operations.

In April 2026, Penn received approval to launch theScore Bet in Alberta on July 13, 2026, as part of its new regulated online gambling market.
