= ESPN Bet =

American sports betting company

- Formerly: Barstool Sportsbook (2020–2023)
- Company type: Subsidiary
- Industry: Sports betting
- Founded: September 2020; 5 years ago
- Defunct: November 2025; 6 months ago
- Fate: Merged into theScore Bet
- Parent: Penn Entertainment

ESPN Bet (stylized as ESPN BET) was a brand of American sportsbooks and online sports betting services operated by Penn Entertainment. Its branding was licensed from ESPN Inc., which cross-promoted ESPN Bet across its digital properties and television networks.

It originally launched in 2020 as the Barstool Sportsbook, co-branded with the then-Penn owned Barstool Sports. In August 2023, Penn sold Barstool back to its founder Dave Portnoy, and concurrently announced a brand licensing agreement with ESPN; the 10-year agreement was valued at $1.5 billion, plus $500,000 in options for ESPN to purchase Penn stock. Barstool Sportsbook was succeeded by ESPN Bet on November 14, 2023.

ESPN Bet operated mobile sports betting in 18 states, and offered retail sportsbooks at selected Penn Entertainment casinos. In November 2025, after the service failed to gain a significant market share, Penn and ESPN announced that they would end their partnership early: Penn moved ESPN Bet customers to its subsidiary theScore Bet in December 2025, and competing sportsbook and daily fantasy sports service DraftKings entered into an agreement to make it the official sports betting partner of ESPN.

== History ==
=== As Barstool Sportsbook ===
In January 2020, Penn bought a 36% minority stake in the sports and pop culture website Barstool Sports, with media outlets anticipating that it planned to leverage the Barstool brand as part of a sports betting service. In September 2020, Barstool and Penn subsequently launched the Barstool Sportsbook app in Pennsylvania; they sought to leverage Barstool's existing social media following and digital media properties to promote the service to a target audience of young adults, in contrast to other gaming companies that entered into marketing partnerships with sports television broadcasters (such as Fox Sports and The Stars Group, and NBC Sports and PointsBet). Barstool CEO Erika Nardini explained that "in our case, our content is the marketing. The way we talk to our fans, the way we connect. The way we make things fun. We have an appeal to the 21-plus audience in a way no one else has."

By 2023, Barstool Sportsbook offered mobile betting in 17 states, and Penn had acquired the remaining stakes in Barstool from founder David Portnoy and The Chernin Group for $388 million. Some of Penn Entertainment's casinos also constructed or rebranded their sportsbooks under the Barstool Sportsbook banner, with 19 locations by 2023.

=== As ESPN Bet ===
On August 8, 2023, Penn announced an agreement with ESPN Inc. to launch a new sports betting brand, ESPN Bet; under the agreement, Penn would pay $1.5 billion to license the ESPN brand for 10 years, and provide ESPN with $500,000 in stock options. In turn, ESPN would provide marketing and access to its talent for the service. The agreement would take advantage of ESPN's larger brand equity over Barstool; the same day, Portnoy announced that Penn had sold Barstool back to him for $1, and 50% of gross revenue from any future sale of the site. He argued that "the regulated industry is probably not the best place for Barstool Sports and the type of content we make", and stated of the sale clause that he planned to continue owning Barstool "till I die". In an opinion piece published by the Poynter Institute for Media Studies, former Tampa Bay Times and Minneapolis Star-Tribune journalist Tom Jones expressed concerns over the partnership, including whether ESPN could "[maintain] journalistic integrity when covering gambling" and would be "ethical and responsible in dealing with those in the audience who might have gambling problems."

By launching an ESPN-branded sportsbook, Penn triggered escape clauses in the existing marketing agreements ESPN had with DraftKings and Caesars Entertainment for daily fantasy sports and sports betting tie-ins respectively; this resulted in the closure of ESPN's Las Vegas studio at The Linq, and ESPN2's sports betting studio show Daily Wager moving to ESPN's headquarters in Bristol, Connecticut. Ahead of the launch, the Barstool branding began to be removed from the retail sportsbooks at Penn's casinos in October 2023, and Daily Wager was renamed ESPN Bet Live beginning November 10. ESPN Bet officially launched on November 14, 2023, replacing Barstool Sportsbook in the 17 states where Penn is licensed to offer online betting.

On November 30, 2023, Penn announced an agreement with the National Hockey League to become an official sports betting partner; ESPN is one of the league's U.S. rightsholders. The deal is represented in the United States via ESPN Bet. In December 2023, Penn announced a partnership with Quail Hollow Club in order to receive a market access agreement for ESPN Bet in North Carolina, expanding it to its 18th state; the agreement also included a sponsorship of the PGA Tour's Wells Fargo Championship.

In April 2024, the sportsbook at Hollywood Casino at Greektown was relaunched as an ESPN Bet sportsbook—marking the first retail location under the new name. Its opening coincided with the 2024 NFL draft in Detroit, while ESPN Bet Live would broadcast two episodes on-location from Greektown as part of ESPN's draft coverage. Soon after launching in Michigan, ESPN Bet faced scrutiny for voiding entire parlays if any single leg resulted in a push, even if all other legs were successful. In contrast, most other sports betting operators treat a push as a non-factor, simply removing that leg from the parlay and adjusting the odds accordingly.

In August 2024, Penn announced that a further eight ESPN Bet locations would open in August and September 2024, beginning with Hollywood Casino at Kansas Speedway, L'Auberge Baton Rouge, and Plainridge Park Casino.

ESPN Bet had only achieved a 5% market share by February 2025; Penn had targeted a 20% share by 2027. Penn CEO Jay Snowden stated that the business was "not on pace" to reach growth targets, and that they still "[had] more work to do to unlock the full potential and value of our partnership with ESPN".

On November 6, 2025, Penn and ESPN announced that they would mutually end their agreement in December 2025; ESPN Bet customers (including its newly-launched services in Missouri) were transitioned to Penn's theScore Bet services, while ESPN announced a new agreement with competitor DraftKings to become its sports betting partner. A former ESPN executive welcomed the move away from the increasing betting focus in ESPN commentary.
