= Hollywood Casino Tunica =

Casino and hotel in Tunica Resorts, Mississippi

- Interactive map of Hollywood Casino Tunica
- Location: Tunica Resorts, Mississippi; 1150 Casino Strip Resort Blvd; 34°48′45″N 90°25′03″W
- Opened: August 8, 1994
- Theme: Art Deco
- No. of rooms: 494
- Gaming space: 54,000 sq ft (5,000 m^{2})
- Notable restaurants: Epic Buffet; Fairbanks Steakhouse; Celebrity Grill
- Casino type: Riverboat casino
- Owner: Gaming and Leisure Properties
- Operating license holder: Penn Entertainment
- Previous names: Summit Casino (in planning)
- Website: hollywoodcasinotunica.com

Hollywood Casino Tunica is a casino and hotel located in Tunica Resorts, Mississippi.

== History ==
Casinos were brought to Tunica County, Mississippi in the early 1990s as a revenue stream to improve the conditions at the time. At one point, Tunica County held the distinction of being the poorest county in the United States. The casinos in general brought in a host of jobs and revenue to the area, and had risen to become one of the larger gaming markets in the country at one time.

The Hollywood Casino began under the name Summit Casino, originally one of four planned for the Commerce Landing area of Tunica. While under construction, Hollywood Casino Corp. bought the casino project from Summit Casinos International for $15 million. At the time, Hollywood Casino Corp. owned the Sands Atlantic City and had opened a riverboat casino in Aurora, Illinois, the Hollywood Casino Aurora, the year before. Hollywood opened in Tunica on August 8, 1994, becoming the ninth casino in Tunica and joining Sam's Town, Southern Belle, and Harrah's at the Commerce Landing section of Tunica.

In 2003, Penn National Gaming (now Penn Entertainment) purchased the Dallas-based Hollywood Casino Corp. for $328 million. Penn National kept the Hollywood branding, and has since used the Hollywood name extensively in other casino developments.

In 2017, the neighboring Resorts casino (formerly Southern Belle) as well as Bally's (now the 1st Jackpot Casino Tunica) were sold to Penn National Gaming. Penn National closed the Resorts property in July 2019 due to declining revenues, but still operates the 1st Jackpot casino.

== Property information ==
Hollywood Casino Tunica has 54,000 sq ft (5,000 m^{2}) of gaming space with over 1,000 slot machines, 20 table games, and a sports book. A 494-room hotel and a 123-space RV park are also on the property. There are three restaurants: Epic Buffet, Fairbanks Steakhouse, and the Celebrity Grill. Also, The Stage Bar hosts live music. There is also an event venue and ballroom available.

== See also ==
- List of casinos in Mississippi
