= Gaming and Leisure Properties =

American real estate investment trust

Gaming and Leisure Properties, Inc.
- Type: Public
- Traded as: Nasdaq: GLPI; S&P 400 component
- Founded: November 1, 2013; 12 years ago
- Headquarters: Wyomissing, Pennsylvania, U.S.
- Revenue: $1.6 billion (2025)
- Net income: $850 million (2025)
- Total assets: $12.9 billion (2025)
- Number of employees: 20 (2025)
- Website: glpropinc.com

Gaming and Leisure Properties, Inc. is a real estate investment trust (REIT) specializing in casino properties, based in Wyomissing, Pennsylvania. It was formed in November 2013 as a corporate spin-off from Penn National Gaming. The company owns 64 casino properties, all of which are leased to other companies.

== History ==
The company was created as a corporate spin-off from Penn National Gaming (now Penn Entertainment), effective November 1, 2013. The corporate breakup was designed to increase investor returns by taking advantage of the lack of federal income taxes on REITs.

In November 2013, GLPI agreed to finance a proposed billion-dollar casino in Milford, Massachusetts, but the project was killed days later when town voters rejected the casino.

In January 2014, the company acquired the real estate assets of the Casino Queen in East St. Louis, Illinois for $140 million, and leased them back to the casino's operating company for $14 million a year. GLPI also loaned $43 million to the casino.

The company's Argosy Casino in Sioux City, Iowa was forced to close in July 2014, and GLPI then sold the casino's real estate.

In May 2014, GLPI agreed to buy The Meadows Racetrack and Casino in western Pennsylvania from Cannery Casino Resorts for $465 million. The company said it would sell the facility's license to a third-party operator, while retaining ownership of the land and buildings. The deal ran into trouble, with GLPI filing a lawsuit accusing Cannery of fraud in October 2014; the lawsuit was eventually settled with an agreement on a reduced purchase price of $440 million.

After casino operator Pinnacle Entertainment announced its own plan in November 2014 to spin off a REIT with the real estate assets of its 15 casinos, GLPI approached Pinnacle with an offer to buy those assets, which it said would be simpler and faster than Pinnacle's plan. Pinnacle did not respond to the offer, so GLPI went public with its offer in March 2015. In July, the companies reached a deal for GLPI to buy 14 of Pinnacle's 15 properties for $4.75 billion in stock, and lease them back to Pinnacle, with rent starting at $377 million per year. The acquisition was completed in April 2016. GLPI also completed its purchase of The Meadows in September 2016 and sold the racetrack operation to Pinnacle for $138 million.

In May 2015, GLPI agreed to finance the real estate portion of a proposed $650-million casino in New Bedford, Massachusetts, but the plan was canceled months later after developers failed to secure the rest of the needed funding.

In May 2017, GLPI purchased the real estate assets of Bally's Casino Tunica and Resorts Casino Tunica for a total of $83 million, while Penn National simultaneously acquired their operating assets.

In October 2018, the company acquired the real estate of five casinos from Tropicana Entertainment for $964 million. The purchase was part of a three-way deal in which Eldorado Resorts simultaneously acquired Tropicana's operating business and leased the casinos from GLPI for a total of $88 million per year.

Weeks later, GLPI completed a four-way deal that saw its two largest tenants combine into one, as Penn National acquired Pinnacle. GLPI also gained a new tenant in Boyd Gaming, which purchased the operations of three of Pinnacle's leased properties. In connection with the merger, GLPI acquired the real estate of Plainridge Park Casino from Penn National for $250 million, and lent $58 million to Boyd to acquire the real estate of Belterra Park. GLPI later acquired ownership of Belterra Park in satisfaction of the loan.

In April 2020, during the COVID-19 pandemic, Penn National faced the prospect of financial issues brought on by resort closures. As a result, it sold the real estate of the Tropicana Las Vegas to GLPI for $338 million in rent credits. Penn National would continue to operate the Tropicana for another two years, or until the resort were sold.

GLPI took ownership of Lumière Place from Caesars Entertainment (formerly Eldorado Resorts) in October 2020, in satisfaction of a $246 million loan.

In 2021, GLPI sold the operations of its two owned-and-operated casinos for a total of $59 million, to focus on its core business of real estate. The operating business of Hollywood Casino Perryville was sold to Penn National, while that of Hollywood Casino Baton Rouge was sold to Casino Queen.

In June 2021, GLPI added Bally's Corporation as a new tenant, purchasing the Dover Downs racino for $144 million. GLPI also agreed to sell the operations of the Tropicana Las Vegas to Bally's and to buy two other casinos from Bally's for $150 million, and obtained a right of first refusal to buy future casinos developed by Bally's. Two more properties (Bally's Tiverton and Hard Rock Hotel & Casino Biloxi) were acquired from Bally's in 2023 for $635 million. Another two properties (Bally's Kansas City and Bally's Shreveport) were bought in 2024 for $395 million. Bally's Twin River Lincoln was added in 2026 for $700 million.

In December 2021, GLPI reached a deal with the Cordish Companies to purchase three casino properties (Live Casino Philadelphia, Live Casino Maryland, and Live Casino Pittsburgh) for a total of $1.8 billion and lease them back for a total of $125 million per year, and to partner with Cordish in future casino projects. The purchase was completed in March 2022.

In 2023, GLPI purchased the land where the Hard Rock Casino was being built in Rockford, Illinois, for $100 million. In 2024, it acquired Tioga Downs, a racino in New York, for $175 million, and three small casinos in Nevada and South Dakota from Strategic Gaming Management, for $105 million. A fourth property, Sunland Park Racetrack & Casino, was purchased from Strategic Gaming in 2025 for $184 million.

== Properties ==
Gaming and Leisure Properties owns the following properties:

=== Leased to Bally's Corporation ===
- Bally's Baton Rouge — Baton Rouge, Louisiana
- Bally's Black Hawk — Black Hawk, Colorado
- Bally's Chicago — Chicago, Illinois (under development)
- Bally's Dover — Dover, Delaware
- Bally's Evansville — Evansville, Indiana
- Bally's Kansas City — Kansas City, Missouri
- Bally's Quad Cities — Rock Island, Illinois
- Bally's Shreveport — Shreveport, Louisiana
- Bally's Tiverton — Tiverton, Rhode Island
- Bally's Twin River Lincoln — Lincoln, Rhode Island
- Casino Queen Marquette — Marquette, Iowa
- DraftKings at Casino Queen — East St. Louis, Illinois
- Hard Rock Hotel & Casino Biloxi — Biloxi, Mississippi
- The Queen Baton Rouge — Baton Rouge, Louisiana
- Tropicana Las Vegas site — Paradise, Nevada

=== Leased to Boyd Gaming ===
- Ameristar Casino Hotel Kansas City — Kansas City, Missouri
- Ameristar Casino Resort Spa St. Charles — St. Charles, Missouri
- Belterra Casino Resort & Spa — Florence, Indiana
- Belterra Park — Anderson Township, Ohio

=== Leased to Caesars Entertainment ===
- Horseshoe St. Louis — St. Louis, Missouri
- Isle Casino Bettendorf — Bettendorf, Iowa
- Isle Casino Waterloo — Waterloo, Iowa
- Tropicana Atlantic City — Atlantic City, New Jersey
- Tropicana Laughlin — Laughlin, Nevada
- Trop Casino Greenville — Greenville, Mississippi

=== Leased to Cordish Companies ===
- Live! Casino & Hotel Maryland — Hanover, Maryland
- Live! Casino & Hotel Philadelphia — Philadelphia, Pennsylvania
- Live! Casino Pittsburgh — Hempfield Township, Pennsylvania

=== Leased to Penn Entertainment ===
- Ameristar Casino Council Bluffs — Council Bluffs, Iowa
- Ameristar Casino Hotel East Chicago — East Chicago, Indiana
- Ameristar Casino Vicksburg — Vicksburg, Mississippi
- Ameristar Casino Resort Spa Black Hawk — Black Hawk, Colorado
- Argosy Casino Alton — Alton, Illinois
- Argosy Casino Riverside — Riverside, Missouri
- Boomtown Biloxi — Biloxi, Mississippi
- Boomtown Bossier City — Bossier City, Louisiana
- Boomtown New Orleans — Harvey, Louisiana
- Cactus Petes Resort Casino — Jackpot, Nevada
- 1st Jackpot Casino Tunica — Tunica Resorts, Mississippi
- Hollywood Casino Aurora — Aurora, Illinois
- Hollywood Casino Hotel & Raceway Bangor — Bangor, Maine
- Hollywood Casino at Charles Town Races — Charles Town, West Virginia
- Hollywood Casino Columbus — Columbus, Ohio
- Hollywood Casino Gulf Coast — Bay St. Louis, Mississippi
- Hollywood Casino Joliet — Joliet, Illinois
- Hollywood Casino Lawrenceburg — Lawrenceburg, Indiana
- Hollywood Casino Morgantown — Morgantown, Pennsylvania
- Hollywood Casino at Penn National Race Course — Grantville, Pennsylvania
- Hollywood Casino Perryville — Perryville, Maryland
- Hollywood Casino St. Louis — Maryland Heights, Missouri
- Hollywood Casino Toledo — Toledo, Ohio
- Hollywood Casino Tunica — Tunica Resorts, Mississippi
- Hollywood Gaming at Dayton Raceway — Dayton, Ohio
- Hollywood Gaming at Mahoning Valley Race Course — Austintown, Ohio
- Horseshu Hotel and Casino — Jackpot, Nevada
- L'Auberge Casino & Hotel Baton Rouge — Baton Rouge, Louisiana
- L'Auberge Casino Resort Lake Charles — Lake Charles, Louisiana
- M Resort — Henderson, Nevada
- The Meadows Racetrack and Casino — North Strabane Township, Pennsylvania
- Plainridge Park Casino — Plainville, Massachusetts
- River City Casino — St. Louis, Missouri
- Zia Park Casino Hotel & Racetrack — Hobbs, New Mexico

=== Leased to Strategic Gaming Management ===
- Baldini's Casino — Sparks, Nevada
- Deadwood Mountain Grand — Deadwood, South Dakota
- Silverado Franklin Hotel & Casino — Deadwood, South Dakota
- Sunland Park Racetrack & Casino — Sunland Park, New Mexico

=== Leased to others ===
- Hard Rock Casino Rockford — Rockford, Illinois (land only)
- Tioga Downs Casino Resort — Nichols, New York

=== Former properties ===
- Argosy Casino Sioux City — Sioux City, Iowa
- Resorts Casino Tunica — Tunica Resorts, Mississippi
