= Argosy Gaming Company =

Casino management company

- Company type: Public
- Traded as: NYSE: AGSY
- Industry: Gaming
- Founded: 1991; 35 years ago
- Defunct: 9 October 2005
- Fate: acquired by Penn National Gaming
- Headquarters: Alton, Illinois
- Website: pngaming.com

Argosy Gaming Company was a US casino operator.

== History ==
The company through the political connections of its chairman William F. Cellini received the first gambling license in Illinois in modern times. It began operations in September 1991 with the opening of the Alton Belle Casino. Among the biggest initial investors was John Connors, brother of tennis champion Jimmy Connors, Illinois attorney and Democratic power-broker L. Thomas Lakin, as well as other influential St. Louis area businessmen. Jimmy Connors would later become a substantial investor with both brothers maintaining a 19 percent share after it went public. It traded on the New York Stock Exchange under the ticker symbol "AGSY. The company toyed with bankruptcy in the late 1990s with John Connors personally declaring Chapter 7 bankruptcy.

In November 2004, Penn National Gaming acquired it for $2.2 billion in cash creating the third largest casino operator in the United States. The merger raised antitrust concerns because Penn National, which already owned Casino Rouge, would gain a monopoly on casinos in Baton Rouge. In order to expedite approval for the merger from federal and state regulators, Penn National put the Argosy Baton Rouge up for sale. Columbia Sussex agreed to buy the property for $150 million.

Penn National and Argosy completed their merger in October 2005.

== Casinos ==
- Argosy Casino Alton - Alton, Illinois
- Belle of Baton Rouge formerly known as Argosy Baton Rouge
- Argosy Casino Riverside in Riverside, Missouri
- Argosy Lawrenceburg in Lawrenceburg, Indiana, now carrying the Hollywood brand
- Argosy Casino Sioux City in Sioux City, Iowa
- Argosy Empress Casino in Joliet, Illinois; Destroyed by fire on March 20, 2009. Rebuilt as Hollywood Casino Joliet
