= Bally's Baton Rouge =

Casino and hotel in Louisiana

Coordinates: 30.4425°N 91.1895°W

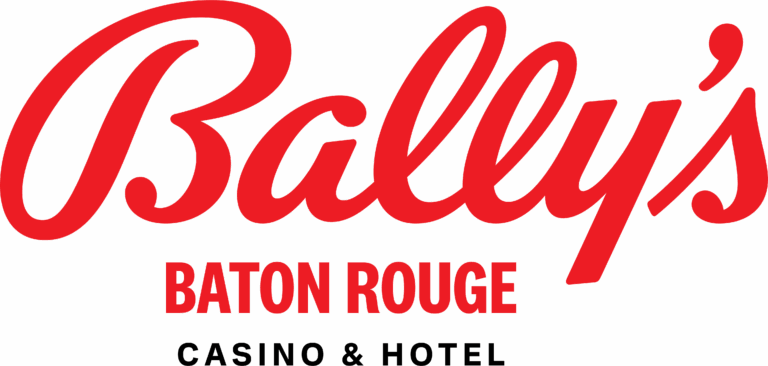

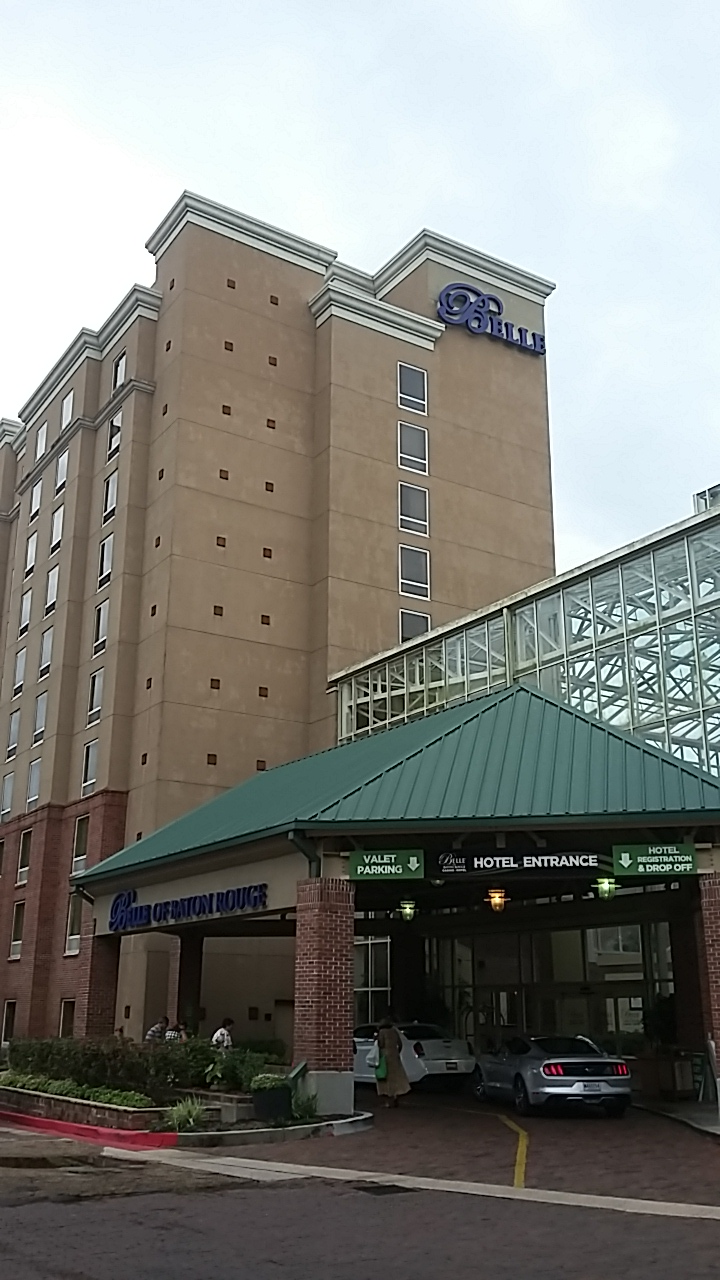
- The entrance of the Belle of Baton Rouge hotel in 2017
- Interactive map of Bally's Baton Rouge
- Location: Baton Rouge, Louisiana; 103 France Street
- Opened: September 30, 1994
- No. of rooms: 242
- Gaming space: 28,500 sq ft (2,650 m^{2})
- Casino type: Land-based
- Owner: Gaming and Leisure Properties
- Operating license holder: Bally's Corporation
- Previous names: Argosy; Catfish Queen; Belle of Baton Rouge
- Website: casinos.ballys.com/baton-rouge

Bally's Baton Rouge, formerly the Belle of Baton Rouge, is a casino hotel in Baton Rouge, Louisiana. It is owned by Gaming and Leisure Properties and operated by Bally's Corporation.

== Facilities ==
The hotel is 10 stories tall, with 288 rooms, a swimming pool, and a fitness center. Next to the hotel is a five-story-tall, 50,000-square-foot (4,600 m^{2}), glass-enclosed atrium. Inside the atrium is a performance venue that has been used for concerts, mixed martial arts events, and nationally televised boxing matches. Other amenities include meeting spaces, three eateries, and two parking garages.

The former casino boat was a 268-foot (82 m), four-deck sternwheeler built by Avondale Shipyard. It has 28,500 square feet (2,650 m^{2}) of gaming space spread across three decks, containing 350 slot machines and 10 table games.

== History ==
=== Catfish Town (1984–1992) ===
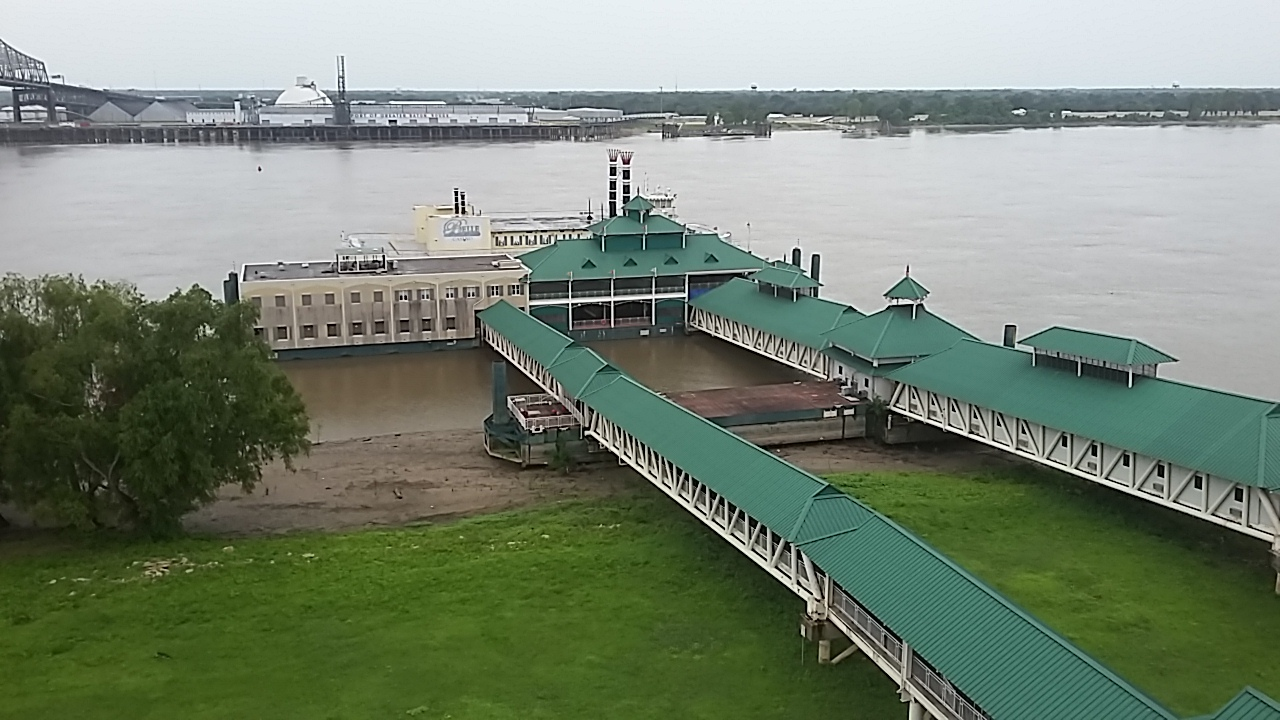
The former casino boat, with enclosed walkways leading to it

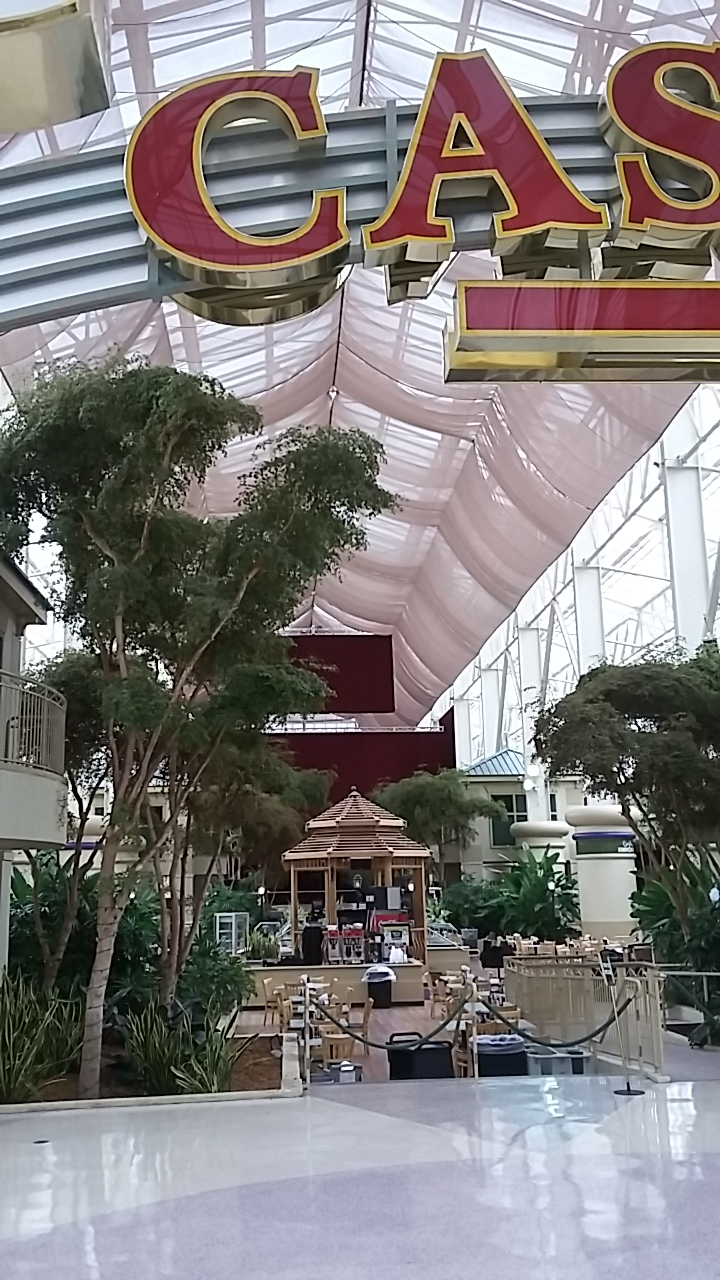
The interior of the atrium

The Belle atrium is located at Catfish Town, a historic warehouse district that was redeveloped and opened as a festival marketplace in July 1984. The $30-million project was developed by a group led by Jerry Dodson, with part of the budget financed by the city government using grant money from the federal Department of Housing and Urban Development.

Catfish Town struggled to attract tenants and shoppers, and by November 1986, its developers had decided to cut their losses. Ownership was transferred in December 1987 to Allied Bank, the primary mortgage holder, as a deed in lieu of foreclosure. The bank's property managers reoriented Catfish Town toward being an office park, based on a marketing study that found that Baton Rouge did not have the population or tourism base to support a festival marketplace. The Resolution Trust Corporation (RTC) was brought in as a tenant in December 1989, and would come to occupy more than half of the complex's leasable space.

Catfish Town was put up for sale in April 1992 by NAB Asset Corp., which had come to own the property through a series of bank reorganizations. The RTC had given notice that it would vacate its offices in January 1993, but NAB hoped that the soon-to-be nearly vacant complex would be attractive to an owner-occupant. Louisiana had legalized riverboat casinos in July 1991, and multiple gaming operators had expressed interest in Catfish Town.

=== Licensing and construction (1993–2001) ===
The riverboat gaming law allowed up to 15 casino licenses to be issued and only to casinos located on certain rivers and lakes, including the Mississippi River. The number of licenses to be issued in the Baton Rouge area became a matter of contention. Baton Rouge city officials pushed for only one casino to be licensed, but the Louisiana Riverboat Gaming Commission decided to allow two casinos.

The casino was originally proposed by Jazz Enterprises, a company formed by several Louisiana and Nevada business people. The casino boat would be docked at the 10-acre (4.0 ha) Catfish Town complex, which Jazz had agreed to purchase for $3.25 million; they would also spend $20 million to upgrade the complex. A 400-room hotel was added to the plan as part of negotiations to gain the city's endorsement. Their proposal won the endorsement of Mayor Tom Ed McHugh and the city council, beating out three other casino applicants in the parish. The Riverboat Gaming Commission gave preliminary approval to the casino in March 1993; the Commission awarded the other Baton Rouge license to Louisiana Casino Cruises (for what would become Casino Rouge, later named Hollywood Casino Baton Rouge).

Summit Casinos had been tapped to manage the casino, but withdrew from the project and was replaced with Argosy Gaming. Argosy would own 90 percent of the casino and up to 15 percent of the remainder of the project. The planned casino was then renamed from the Catfish Queen to the Belle of Baton Rouge, as Argosy planned to include the word "Belle" in all of the company's casinos' names.

The project's prospects were cast into doubt when the Louisiana State Police decided to disregard the Riverboat Gaming Commission's preliminary decisions and evaluate the applicants on their economic potential, including a third proposal by developer Charles Lambert and Lady Luck Gaming to dock a casino boat at the Capitol House Hotel. Ultimately, however, the Jazz Enterprises proposal was ranked as the best out of the three, and it received final licensing approval in July 1994.

During the licensing and construction process, several riverboat applicants, including Jazz Enterprises, were targeted by extortion schemes involving Governor Edwin Edwards. Two associates of Edwards threatened to derail Jazz's project unless they were given a stake in the company. A Jazz executive rebuffed their demands, and instead cooperated with the Federal Bureau of Investigation to make recordings of the threats. Edwards and his associates were convicted on federal racketeering charges in 2000 (though Edwards was acquitted of the charges directly involving Jazz).

A separate legal battle over the Belle's licensing was waged by Lambert, who sued Jazz and Argosy for allegedly omitting important information from their application, and thereby improperly receiving a license that would otherwise have gone to the Lady Luck project. Lambert's litigation carried on until 2010, when the United States Supreme Court declined to review the dismissal of the case.

The casino opened on September 30, 1994.

Argosy purchased Jazz Enterprises in June 1995 for $49 million (including $22 million in forgiven debt), gaining full ownership of Catfish Town and the Belle. Jazz had had a string of confrontations with the city government, culminating in a threat by the city to shut down the casino because construction had been suspended on the parking garage. The sale to Argosy defused the issues and allowed construction to resume.

The three-story Argosy Landing building, the project's first permanent land-based facility, opened in February 1995, featuring a bar, gift shop, and restaurant. The glass-enclosed Argosy Festival Atrium opened in April 1996.

The Belle's name was changed to Argosy Casino Baton Rouge in July 1999.

The casino's contract with the city had required construction of the hotel to begin by September 1996. Since the deadline was missed, Argosy had been making penalty payments to the city of approximately $300,000 per month. Construction of the hotel finally began in July 1999, ending the penalty payments. The Sheraton Baton Rouge Convention Center Hotel opened at the property in February 2001, owned by Argosy and managed by Sheraton.

=== After completion (2002–present) ===
In November 2004, Penn National Gaming agreed to acquire Argosy Gaming. The merger raised antitrust concerns because Penn National, which already owned Casino Rouge, would gain a monopoly on casinos in Baton Rouge. In order to expedite approval for the merger from federal and state regulators, Penn National put the Argosy Baton Rouge up for sale. Columbia Sussex agreed to buy the property for $150 million. Penn National and Argosy completed their merger in October 2005. Weeks later, Penn National closed on the sale of the casino to a Columbia Sussex affiliate (which would later become an independent company, Tropicana Entertainment). The property's name was then reverted to the Belle of Baton Rouge.

The hotel dropped its affiliation with Sheraton in April 2010. A $7-million renovation of the property was begun in 2011 to make it more competitive with the new L'Auberge Baton Rouge casino.

In 2018, Gaming and Leisure Properties (GLP) acquired the real estate of the Belle of Baton Rouge and Eldorado Resorts (later Caesars Entertainment) acquired its operating business, under lease from GLP, as part of the two companies' acquisition of Tropicana Entertainment.

In 2020, Caesars agreed to sell the Belle's operating business to CQ Holding, the parent company of the Casino Queen in Illinois. The sale was completed in May 2022. CQ Holding later became The Queen Casino & Entertainment, and then merged with Bally's Corporation in 2025.

== Finances ==
Each year, the casino reports its adjusted gaming revenue (total wagers placed, less the amount paid out for winning bets) to the Louisiana Gaming Control Board.

== Sports ==
=== Boxing ===
On November 30, 2013, Regis Prograis fought Miguel Alvarez on a boxing card with Prograis winning with a TKO in the 3rd round.

== See also ==
- List of casinos in Louisiana
