= Penn Entertainment =

American gambling company

Penn Entertainment, Inc.
- Formerly: PNRC Corp. (1982–1994); Penn National Gaming, Inc. (1994–2022)
- Type: Public
- Traded as: Nasdaq: PENN; S&P 600 component
- Industry: Casinos; Horse racing; Sports Entertainment; iGaming
- Founded: 1982; 44 years ago
- Headquarters: Wyomissing, Pennsylvania, U.S.
- Key people: Peter M. Carlino (chairman emeritus); David A. Handler (chairman); Jay Snowden (CEO & president)
- Brands: Ameristar; Argosy; Boomtown; Hollywood Casino; L'Auberge
- Revenue: US$6.5 billion (2022)
- Net income: US$222 million (2022)
- Total assets: US$17.5 billion (2022)
- Total equity: US$3.5 billion (2022)
- Number of employees: 21,875 (2022)
- Subsidiaries: Score Media and Gaming; Penn Sports Interactive
- Website: pennentertainment.com

Penn Entertainment, Inc., formerly Penn National Gaming, is an American entertainment company and operator of integrated entertainment, sports content, and casino gambling. It operates 43 properties in 20 states, under brands including Hollywood Casino, Ameristar, and Boomtown. It also owns the Canadian digital media company Score Media and Gaming.

It also offers sports betting in 17 U.S. jurisdictions and online casino gaming in five, under the brand theScore Bet.

== History ==
=== Background and early history (1968–1994) ===
==== Beginning: Pitt Park Raceway, Inc. and the Pennsylvania National Turf Club ====
In 1967, Pennsylvania enacted a law allowing thoroughbred horse racing with parimutuel wagering. Two companies that later formed part of Penn National Gaming were founded in 1968 by groups seeking one of the four available racing licenses: Pitt Park Raceway, Inc., formed by several Erie area businessmen, and the Pennsylvania National Turf Club, established by a group of Central Pennsylvania investors. The Turf Club was awarded one of the licenses, and soon began construction on Penn National Race Course. The complex included a motor speedway, which held its first races in 1971, and the horse track, which hosted its first races in 1972.

Pitt Park Raceway, meanwhile, was denied in its initial application, but received one of a second round of licenses issued in 1970. The first Pitt Park racing meet hosted its first races in 1971 at The Meadows, an existing harness racing track. Pitt Park lost half a million dollars in its first meet, leading its owners to sell the company to a group of investors, including Philadelphia insurance businessman Peter D. Carlino. After another unsuccessful season at The Meadows, Pitt Park was renamed to the Mountainview Thoroughbred Racing Association and moved to Penn National Race Course. Starting in 1973, as a tenant of the Turf Club, Mountainview held 100 nights of racing there each year.

==== Reorganization and renaming to Penn National Gaming ====
In 1982, Carlino purchased Penn National Race Course from the financially struggling Turf Club. The Turf Club continued to operate its own racing meet each year, now as a tenant of Carlino.

The companies involved with Penn National Race Course were reorganized in 1994 in preparation for an initial public offering. PNRC Corp., which had been incorporated in 1982, was renamed as Penn National Gaming, with Mountainview and the Turf Club as its subsidiaries. Carlino's son, Peter M. Carlino, who had earlier managed Mountainview, was Penn National's first CEO, a position he held until 2013. In May 1994, Penn National Gaming became a public company via an initial public offering on the Nasdaq, raising $18 million to pay down debt and fund construction of off-track betting parlors.

=== Expansion (1996–2021) ===
Penn National expanded beyond its first racetrack with the acquisitions of Pocono Downs in 1996, Charles Town Races in 1997, and, in 1999, a half interest in Freehold Raceway and the operations of Garden State Park. Penn National also won approval to begin offering slot machines at Charles Town in 1997.

The company acquired its first standalone casino properties in 2000, buying Casino Magic Bay St. Louis, Cactus Petes Jackpot NV and Boomtown Biloxi from Pinnacle Entertainment for $201 million. This was followed in 2001 by the acquisition of Carnival Resorts & Casinos, including ownership of Casino Rouge in Baton Rouge, Louisiana and the management contract for Casino Rama in Ontario. Next, in 2002, it bought the Bullwhackers Casino in Black Hawk, Colorado from the Hilton Group for $6.5 million.

In 2003, Penn National bought Hollywood Casino Corp. for $328 million plus $360 million in assumed debt, gaining three casinos in Aurora, Illinois; Tunica, Mississippi; and Shreveport, Louisiana. The acquisition, which doubled Penn National's revenues, was part of a continuing strategy to shift away from the horse racing business and into the casino business. The company planned to rebrand its other properties under the Hollywood Casino name.

In 2005, Penn National acquired Argosy Gaming Company for $1.4 billion plus $791 million in assumed debt, adding five casinos and one horse track to its portfolio (not including the Argosy Baton Rouge, which was quickly sold to satisfy antitrust concerns). The purchase again doubled Penn National's size, making it, at the time, the third largest publicly held gaming company in the country (behind MGM Mirage and Harrah's Entertainment).

In November 2006, a deal for Penn National Gaming to acquire Harrah's Entertainment fell through.

In 2007, Penn National acquired the Zia Park racino in Hobbs, New Mexico for $200 million.

An attempt in 2007 to take the company private with a $6.1 billion buyout fell through for prospective buyers Fortress Investment Group and Centerbridge Partners.

In 2011, Penn National acquires the M Resort, its first property in Nevada.

In November 2012, the company announced a plan to spin off a new real estate investment trust (REIT) with ownership of most of its properties, in an effort to reduce taxes and cost of capital, and overcome license ownership restrictions. The REIT owned the land and buildings for 21 of Penn National's 29 casinos and racetracks; Penn National continued to operate all but two of the properties under a lease agreement. The spin-off was completed on November 1, 2013, creating Gaming and Leisure Properties, Inc. (GLPI). As of June 2022, the GLPI trust owned over 50 casino properties, which it leased to companies including Caesars Entertainment, Boyd Gaming Corp., Casino Queen, and Cordish Cos.

In July 2013, Penn National sold the Bullwhackers Casino to a local investor group.

In April 2015, the company agreed to purchase the Tropicana Las Vegas for $360 million.

In August 2016, the company agreed to purchase Rocket Games for $60 million.

In May 2017, Penn National acquired the operating assets of Bally's Casino Tunica and Resorts Casino Tunica for a total of $44 million, and leased the two casinos from GLPI, which had simultaneously purchased the real estate assets.

In October 2018, the company acquired Pinnacle Entertainment for $2.8 billion in cash and stock. To ensure regulatory approval for the deal, Pinnacle sold four of its properties to Boyd Gaming prior to the merger. The result was the addition of twelve new properties to Penn National's holdings, all of them leased from GLPI. In connection with the sale, Penn National sold the real estate of Plainridge Park Casino to GLPI for $250 million.

In 2019, Penn National made two purchases in conjunction with Vici Properties. Penn National bought the operating businesses of the Margaritaville Resort Casino in Louisiana and Greektown Casino–Hotel in Detroit for $115 million and $300 million, respectively, while Vici bought both properties' real estate assets and leased them to Penn. In July 2019, Penn reached market access agreements with multiple gaming companies, including DraftKings, PointsBet, theScore, and The Stars Group, which would allow the companies to sub-license "skins" allotted to land-based casinos owned by Penn for offering iGaming and sports betting in their respective states.

On January 29, 2020, Penn purchased a 36% stake in Barstool Sports for $163 million.

During the COVID-19 pandemic, Penn faced the prospect of financial issues brought on by resort closures. As a result, Penn sold the land occupied by the Tropicana Las Vegas to GLPI. Penn sold the land for $337.5 million in rent credits, and the sale was finalized in April 2020. Penn continued to operate the Tropicana until 2022, when it was sold to Bally's Corporation. In September 2020, Penn and Barstool launched a branded mobile betting service known as Barstool Sportsbook. It was initially launched in New Jersey, and expanded to twelve states by 2021.

In August 2021, Penn National agreed to acquire Canadian digital media company Score Media and Gaming for $2 billion. The companies have had a strategic partnership since 2019. In September 2021, the company opened a career center at Hollywood Casino Morgantown.

In February 2022, Penn National announced a strategic partnership with Sports Betting Exchange in Louisiana. In April 2022, Penn launched sports betting in Ontario, Canada via theScore Bet. The company subsequently announced a sponsorship agreement between theScore and the Toronto Blue Jays as its "official gaming partner".

==== Penn Entertainment (2022–present) ====
In August 2022, the company changed its name to Penn Entertainment to reflect its diversification into sports content and other entertainment. In February 2023, Penn acquired the remainder of Barstool Sports for $388 million.

In August 2023, Penn reached a ten-year, $2 billion licensing agreement with ESPN Inc., under which Penn would rebrand Barstool Sportsbook as ESPN Bet later in the year. To license the branding, Penn would pay $1.5 billion in cash, and give ESPN options for $500 million of its stock. ESPN would provide promotion for the service. Concurrently, Penn announced that it would sell Barstool back to its founder Dave Portnoy for $1 and 50% of gross revenue from any future sale of the site; Portnoy stated that he planned to continue owning Barstool Sports "till I die".

The licensing agreement with ESPN was terminated early in November 2025, with ESPN Bet customers being transitioned over to Penn's theScore Bet, and ESPN signing a new deal with DraftKings to takeover Penn as its official sports betting partner.

== Properties ==
=== Owned and operated ===
- Freehold Raceway – Freehold, New Jersey (50% ownership)
- Hollywood Casino at Kansas Speedway – Kansas City, Kansas (50% ownership)
- Sam Houston Race Park Ltd.
  - Sam Houston Race Park – Houston, Texas
  - Valley Race Park – Harlingen, Texas (inactive)
- Sanford–Orlando Racebook and Sportsbar – Longwood, Florida

=== Leased or managed ===
- Ameristar Casino Council Bluffs — Council Bluffs, Iowa
- Ameristar Casino Hotel East Chicago — East Chicago, Indiana
- Ameristar Casino Vicksburg — Vicksburg, Mississippi
- Ameristar Casino Resort Spa Black Hawk — Black Hawk, Colorado
- Argosy Casino Alton – Alton, Illinois
- Argosy Casino Riverside – Riverside, Missouri
- Boomtown Biloxi – Biloxi, Mississippi
- Boomtown Bossier City — Bossier City, Louisiana
- Boomtown New Orleans — Harvey, Louisiana
- Cactus Petes Resort Casino — Jackpot, Nevada
- 1st Jackpot Casino Tunica – Tunica Resorts, Mississippi
- Hollywood Casino Aurora – Aurora, Illinois
- Hollywood Casino Bangor – Bangor, Maine
- Hollywood Casino at Charles Town Races – Charles Town, West Virginia
- Hollywood Casino Columbus – Columbus, Ohio
- Hollywood Casino at Greektown — Detroit, Michigan
- Hollywood Casino Gulf Coast – Bay St. Louis, Mississippi
- Hollywood Casino Joliet – Joliet, Illinois
- Hollywood Casino Lawrenceburg – Lawrenceburg, Indiana
- Hollywood Casino Morgantown – Morgantown, Pennsylvania
- Hollywood Casino at Penn National Race Course – Grantville, Pennsylvania
- Hollywood Casino Perryville – Perryville, Maryland
- Hollywood Casino St. Louis – Maryland Heights, Missouri
- Hollywood Casino Toledo – Toledo, Ohio
- Hollywood Casino Tunica – Tunica Resorts, Mississippi
- Hollywood Casino York – York, Pennsylvania
- Hollywood Gaming at Dayton Raceway – Dayton, Ohio
- Hollywood Gaming at Mahoning Valley Race Course – Austintown, Ohio
- Horseshu Hotel and Casino — Jackpot, Nevada
- L'Auberge Casino & Hotel Baton Rouge — Baton Rouge, Louisiana
- L'Auberge Casino Resort Lake Charles — Lake Charles, Louisiana
- M Resort – Henderson, Nevada
- Margaritaville Resort Casino – Bossier City, Louisiana
- The Meadows Racetrack and Casino — North Strabane Township, Pennsylvania
- Plainridge Park Casino – Plainville, Massachusetts
- Prairie State Gaming - Illinois slot route operator
- Retama Park — Selma, Texas
- River City Casino — St. Louis, Missouri
- Zia Park Casino – Hobbs, New Mexico

=== Former ===
- Argosy Casino Sioux City – Sioux City, Iowa (closed)
- Beulah Park – Grove City, Ohio (closed)
- Bullwhackers Casino – Black Hawk, Colorado (sold)
- Casino Rama – Rama, Ontario (management contract terminated July 2018)
- Hollywood Casino Baton Rouge – Baton Rouge, Louisiana (spun off)
- Hollywood Casino Jamul – Jamul, California (management contract terminated)
- Hollywood Casino Shreveport – Shreveport, Louisiana (sold to Eldorado Resorts during a bankruptcy procedure)
- Raceway Park – Toledo, Ohio (closed)
- Resorts Casino Tunica – Tunica Resorts, Mississippi (closed)
- Tropicana Las Vegas – Paradise, Nevada (sold)
