= River City Casino (Lemay) =

River City Casino and Hotel

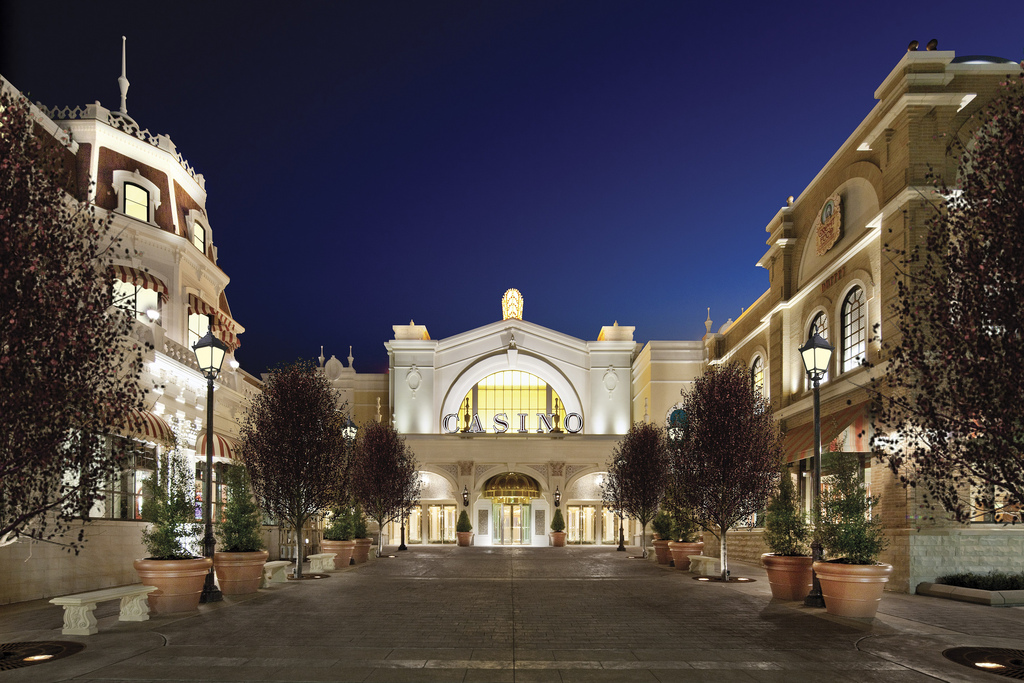
- Interactive map of River City Casino and Hotel
- Location: Lemay, Missouri; 777 River City Casino Boulevard (Lemay); 38.5308°N 90.2645°W
- Opened: March 4, 2010
- Theme: 1904 World’s Fair
- Gaming space: 90,000 sq ft (8,400 m^{2})
- Casino type: Land
- Owner: Gaming and Leisure Properties
- Operating license holder: Penn Entertainment
- Architect: Bergman Walls & Associates
- Website: rivercity.com

River City Casino is a casino in Lemay, Missouri, in Greater St. Louis. It is owned by Gaming and Leisure Properties and operated by Penn Entertainment. It opened on March 4, 2010.

== History ==
Located in Lemay, Missouri, River City Casino is on the western bank of the Mississippi River. The property's decor uses a 1904 World’s Fair theme. Built for an initial $380 million, the project's second phase requires an additional $75 million investment within the first three years for construction of a hotel. In 2010, the Riverfront Times named River City Casino the Best St. Louis Casino in their annual awards.

In April 2016, Pinnacle Entertainment sold the property to Gaming and Leisure Properties and leased it back, along with almost all of Pinnacle's real estate assets. Penn National Gaming (now Penn Entertainment) acquired River City's operations in October 2018 as part of the acquisition of Pinnacle.

== Casino ==
River City Casino is 56 acres (230,000 m^{2}) with parking for 3,000 vehicles. A 90,000-square-foot (8,400 m^{2}) gaming floor has approximately 2,000 slots and 55 gaming tables. It is the only casino in the St. Louis area that does not currently offer a poker room: its 8-table room was shuttered in 2018 and renovated into an Asian gaming lounge specializing in baccarat. The casino includes the 75-seat Judy’s Velvet lounge, a sports bar by day and a music venue by night.

== Restaurants ==
There are five dining establishments in the casino including Burger Brothers, The 1904 Steakhouse, The Beerhouse, Asia Noodles, and Cibare Italian Kitchen.

== See also ==
- List of casinos in Missouri
