= Argosy Casino Alton =

Riverboat casino in Illinois

- Interactive map of Argosy Casino Alton
- Location: Alton, Illinois; 1 Piasa St; 38°53′22″N 90°11′10″W
- Opened: 1991
- Gaming space: 23,000 sq ft (2,100 m^{2})
- Casino type: Riverboat
- Owner: Gaming and Leisure Properties
- Operating license holder: Penn Entertainment
- Public transit access: MCT
- Website: argosyalton.com

Argosy Casino Alton is a riverboat casino located in Alton, Illinois, in the Greater St. Louis metropolitan area. It is owned by Gaming and Leisure Properties and operated by Penn Entertainment.

== History ==
The Argosy opened in 1991 as a small riverboat casino named the Alton Belle owned by the Argosy Gaming Company and had 296 slot machines and 22 table games. Over 450 patrons attended the opening on September 24, 1991. It was replaced by a larger riverboat, the Alton Belle II, in 1993, and cruised for one hour to meet legal requirements. In 1999, when Illinois allowed casinos to be permanently moored, the riverboat no longer cruised the river, although the casino still remains on an actual boat.

Unlike other competitors, the Argosy does not offer any lodging. Missouri allowed casinos in 1994, which quickly led to competition in the St. Louis metro area. In November 2004, Penn National Gaming (now Penn Entertainment) acquired the Argosy Gaming Company. Furthermore, in January 2008, Illinois declared all casinos smoke-free, while Missouri lifted a $500 loss limit in November 2008, both having increased negative effects on the Argosy. Revenue in November 2011 had fallen to $5.6 million, the lowest of all St. Louis area casinos.

The Argosy Alton was closed briefly in May 2019 due to flooding on the Mississippi River.

== Casino information ==
The Argosy Alton has 516 slot machines and 9 table games. There are two restaurants on the property and 1,341 parking spaces. The two dining options are: Riverside Grill and Hops House.

The Argosy is open from 9am to 2am.

== See also ==
- List of casinos in Illinois
