= List of casinos in Maryland =

This is a list of casinos in Maryland.

== List of casinos ==
Casino	Opening	Location	VLTS	Tables	Revenue	Notes
Rocky Gap Casino Resort	May 22, 2013	Flintstone	631	18	$53,808,925	
Horseshoe Casino Baltimore	August 26, 2014	Baltimore	2,202	178	$271,550,568	
Hollywood Casino Perryville	September 17, 2010	Perryville	850	22	$74,337,371	The first casino to open in the state.
Live! Casino & Hotel	June 6, 2012	Hanover	3,994	206	$544,992,891	The first phase, with 3,200 slot machines and electronic table games, opened on June 6, 2012. Phase II, with 1,550 additional machines, opened in September 2012. Traditional live table games began operation on April 11, 2013. A two-story Poker Room opened on August 28, 2013.
Ocean Downs	January 4, 2011	Berlin	800	0	$61,019,442	The casino opened in 2011, complementing a facility which already featured live horse racing.
MGM National Harbor	December 8, 2016	Oxon Hill	3,139	165	$608,627,387	On December 20, 2013, MGM Resorts International was awarded the license to construct a $925 million casino resort in National Harbor. The figure subsequently went up to an approved $1.2 billion.

== Description ==
Rocky Gap Casino Resort was built on the grounds of Rocky Gap State Park. First proposal was rejected due to failure by the developer to pay licensing fees. The Maryland Lottery subsequently lowered the casino tax rate for this location and allowed a second round of bids for new proposals, however, no developers submitted any bids. During the third round of bids, three developers submitted bids and licensing fees, two of which were rejected. The license went to the remaining developer and was awarded in late April 2012. Construction began after receiving approval by the Board of Public Works. The developer bought the entire existing resort in addition to building the casino.

== Potential Expansion ==
Governor Martin O'Malley promised to look to expand Maryland's array of gambling in the 2012 legislative session. On February 7, 2012, Senator Douglas JJ Peters introduced legislation in the Maryland State Senate that would legalize an additional casino in Prince George's County. His legislation would legalize a certain number of slot machines and table games in Prince George's as well as table games for the other two open and three yet-to-open casinos in Maryland. The legislation would set aside 2.5% of the Prince George's County casino revenue for an economic development fund and an additional 2.5% of revenue to fund the construction of a new hospital in the county. Such legislation must be approved by the House of Delegates, Senate, Governor, statewide voter referendum, and county-wide voter referendum. At the time, there was speculation that a casino license in Prince George's County would be awarded to a company that plans to build it at either National Harbor or Rosecroft Raceway. While this proposal failed during the regular 2012 legislative session, Governor O'Malley championed a special session in July of that year to address the issue of gambling expansion, which passed in the Maryland legislature. The casino legislation required it to pass a Maryland referendum in November. On November 6, 2012, the casino referendum passed, allowing table games at the existing authorized casinos and allowing a sixth casino to be built in Prince George's County. On December 20, 2013, the Prince George's County casino license was awarded to MGM Resorts International for a casino resort, which opened on December 8, 2016, at National Harbor.

In 2020, the voters of Maryland legalized sports betting. Maryland's casinos will be automatically granted licenses for in-person sports betting. A poll conducted by MDbetting in 2023 also revealed that 75% of participants would like to have casino games on their mobile devices.

== See also ==
- List of casinos in the United States
- Tourism in Maryland
