= Hollywood Casino St. Louis =

Casino in Missouri, United States

Coordinates: 38.751926°N 90.479323°W

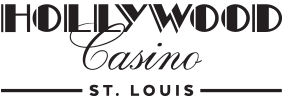

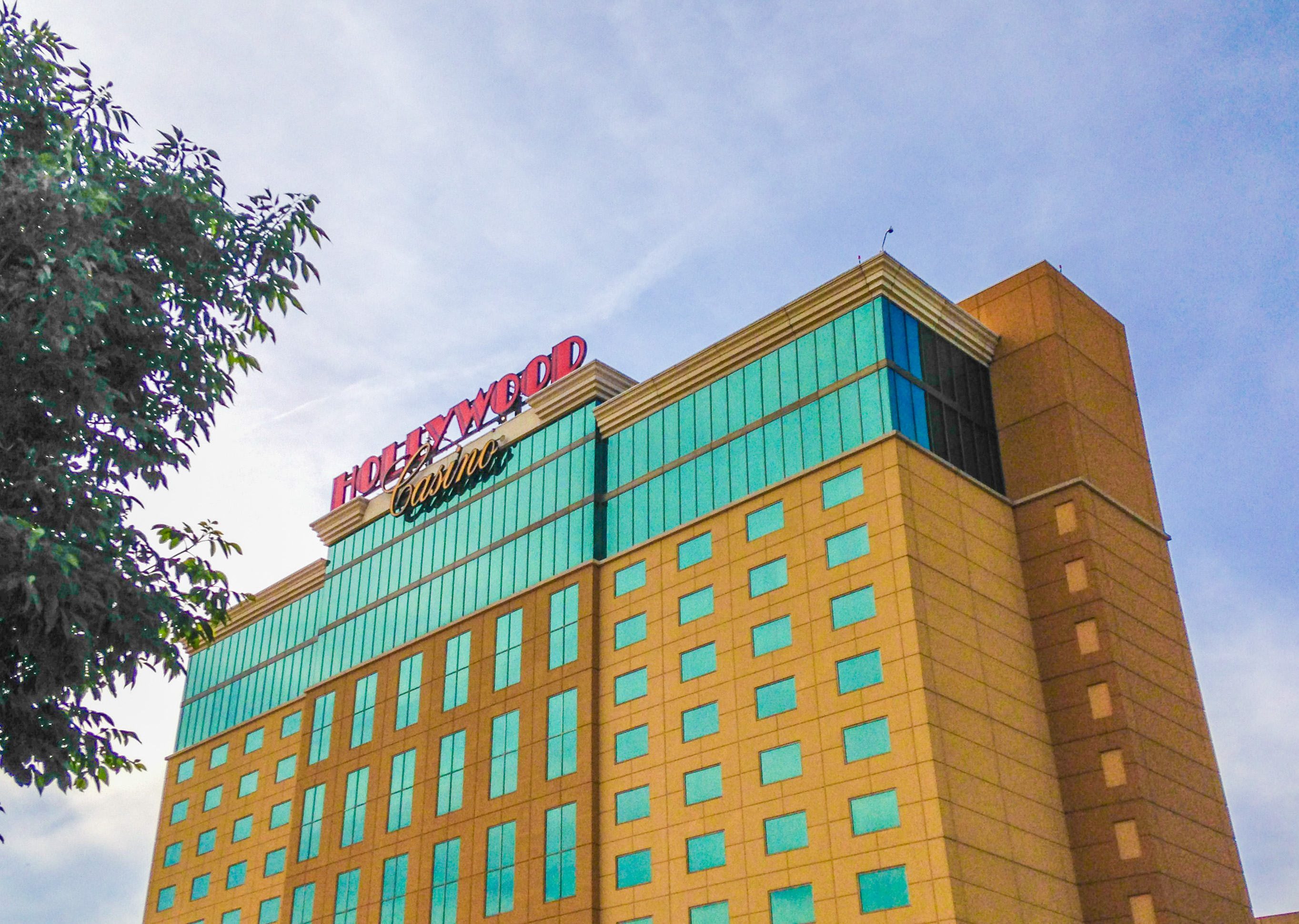
- Hollywood Casino St. Louis in 2016
- Interactive map of Hollywood Casino St. Louis
- Location: Maryland Heights, Missouri; 777 Casino Center Blvd.
- Theme: Carnival
- No. of rooms: 502 (455 rooms & 47 suites)
- Gaming space: 120,000 sq ft (11,000 m^{2})
- Permanent shows: Boogie Nights
- Notable restaurants: Final Cut, Charlie Gitto's, Hops 99
- Casino type: casino
- Owner: Gaming and Leisure Properties
- Operating license holder: Penn Entertainment
- Previous names: Harrah's St. Louis
- Website: hollywoodcasinostlouis.com

Hollywood Casino St. Louis is a casino in Maryland Heights, Missouri, a suburb of St. Louis. It is owned by Gaming and Leisure Properties and operated by Penn Entertainment. The casino has 120,000 sq ft (11,000 m^{2}) of gaming space, with 2,180 slot machines and 91 table games.

Penn National Gaming (now Penn Entertainment) acquired the casino, then named Harrah's St. Louis, in November 2012 from Caesars Entertainment for $610 million.

== See also ==
- List of casinos in Missouri
