= Resorts Casino Tunica =

Defunct hotel, casino, and golf course in Mississippi

Coordinates: 34.815477°N 90.417579°W

- Interactive map of Resorts Casino Tunica
- Location: Tunica Resorts, Mississippi; 1100 Casino Strip Boulevard
- Opened: 1994
- Closed: June 30, 2019
- No. of rooms: 201
- Gaming space: 35,000 sq ft (3,300 m^{2})
- Signature attractions: River Bend Links golf course
- Notable restaurants: 61 Grille Steakhouse; EATs; Delta Blues Buffet
- Casino type: Riverboat casino
- Owner: Gaming & Leisure Properties
- Operating license holder: Penn National Gaming
- Previous names: Southern Belle Casino; Harrah's Tunica Mardi Gras Casino
- Renovated in: 1996, 2005, 2014
- Website: resortstunica.com

Resorts Casino Tunica, formerly Southern Belle Casino and Harrah's Tunica Mardi Gras Casino, was a 201-room hotel and a 35,000-square-foot (3,300 m^{2}) casino located in Tunica Resorts, Mississippi. It was one of three casinos located in the "Casino Strip" area, along with Sam's Town and Hollywood Casino. Resorts was owned by Gaming & Leisure Properties and operated by Penn National Gaming.

The resort closed in June 2019 due to declining revenue.

== History ==
=== Southern Belle Casino (1994–1995) ===
The casino was developed by Belle Casinos, a company that owned the Biloxi Belle casino on the Mississippi Gulf Coast and was owned primarily by restaurateur Jim Hasslocher. Construction was budgeted for $30 million, but ran up to $67 million. The Southern Belle Casino opened for a two-day test run on February 19, 1994, and then opened permanently on February 24. It was designed to resemble a Southern mansion, and had facilities including 60,000 square feet (5,600 m^{2}) of gaming space, three restaurants, and a 1,500-seat event venue, the River Bend Event Center.

The Southern Belle closed on August 31, 1994, as its owners stated that the Tunica market had become overly saturated, with ten casinos in operation. Belle Casinos filed for Chapter 11 bankruptcy protection on the same day. They initially planned to move the Southern Belle casino boat to the Biloxi Belle site, but that property closed in January 1995, and they began seeking a buyer for the Southern Belle instead. In July 1995, the property was bought out of bankruptcy for $34 million by a partnership between Harrah's Entertainment and Belz Enterprises, which owned a Harrah's casino about a block away.

=== Harrah's Tunica Mardi Gras Casino (1996–2004) ===
Harrah's spent $49 million to add a 200-room hotel and renovate the casino with a New Orleans theme, with three different areas patterned after the French Quarter, the Garden District, and Mardi Gras. The casino reopened on April 8, 1996 as Harrah's Tunica Mardi Gras Casino. The hotel opened two months later. Harrah's continued to operate two casinos in the area for some time, and bought out Belz's stake in the properties in April 1997. A month later, it closed the original Harrah's Tunica to concentrate on the Mardi Gras casino.

=== Resorts Casino (2005–2019) ===
In 2004, Harrah's agreed to buy Caesars Entertainment. The combined company would have controlled five of Tunica Resorts' nine casinos: Harrah's, Grand Casino, Horseshoe Casino, Sheraton Casino and Hotel and Bally's Casino. Because of possible anti-competitive domination of the Tunica market, Harrah's agreed to sell the property, along with Bally's, to Colony Capital, who then created Resorts International Holdings to own and operate the casinos (including Bally's Tunica). The casino was renamed Resorts Casino Tunica in 2005.

On November 9, 2011, Foundation Gaming Group of Gulfport, Mississippi assumed the management of Resorts Casino and Hotel along with Bally's Casino Tunica. In 2013, management responsibility changed.

In May 2017, Resorts and Bally's Tunica were sold in a joint deal, with Gaming & Leisure Properties acquiring their real estate assets for a total of $83 million, and Penn National purchasing the operating assets for a total of $44 million.

Penn National announced in April 2019 that Resorts Tunica would close on June 30 because of declining revenues, which were attributed to the expansion of casino gaming in Arkansas. In the summer of 2021, both the hotel and casino were demolished. All that is left of this resort is a grassed field.

== Dining ==
Resorts Casino Tunica featured three dining venues:

- 61 Grille Steakhouse
- EATs
- Delta Blues Buffet

== Entertainment ==
The casino featured a casino stage bar featuring live entertainment on Fridays and Saturdays. Resorts Casino was adjacent to River Bend Links golf course.
