= Hollywood Casino Lawrenceburg =

Casino in Indiana, United States

Coordinates: 39.0962°N 84.8427°W

- Interactive map of Hollywood Casino Lawrenceburg
- Location: Lawrenceburg, Indiana; 777 Hollywood Boulevard
- Opened: December 13, 1996
- Gaming space: 150,000 sq ft (14,000 m^{2})
- Casino type: Land-based
- Owner: Gaming and Leisure Properties
- Operating license holder: Penn Entertainment
- Previous names: Argosy Casino
- Website: hollywoodindiana.com

Hollywood Casino Lawrenceburg is a casino in Lawrenceburg, Indiana, US, in the Cincinnati metropolitan area. It is owned by Gaming and Leisure Properties and operated by Penn Entertainment.

== History ==
The casino was originally named Argosy Casino, and was operated by Argosy Gaming Company. In 2004, Argosy was acquired by Penn National Gaming (now Penn Entertainment).

In June 2009, Penn National unveiled a much larger riverboat with a passenger capacity of nearly 9,000 guests and 4,400 gaming positions. The new boat also marked the changeover from the Argosy name to Penn National's primary brand, Hollywood Casino. The new boat also features a rebranded World Poker Tour poker room.

== See also ==
- List of casinos in Indiana
