= Ameristar Casino Vicksburg =

Riverboat casino located in Vicksburg, Mississippi

Ameristar Casino Hotel Vicksburg
- Interactive map of Ameristar Casino Hotel Vicksburg
- Location: Vicksburg, MS; 4116 Washington St; 32.315166°N 90.900822°W
- Opened: 1994
- No. of rooms: 149
- Gaming space: 70,000 sq ft (6,500 m^{2})
- Casino type: Riverboat casino
- Owner: Gaming and Leisure Properties
- Operating license holder: Penn Entertainment
- Website: ameristarvicksburg.com

Ameristar Casino Hotel Vicksburg is a riverboat casino located in Vicksburg, Mississippi on the Mississippi River. It is owned by Gaming and Leisure Properties and operated by Penn Entertainment.

The property includes 70,000 sq. ft. of gaming space, 149 hotel rooms, over 1,400 slot machines, and 30 table games.

== See also ==
- List of casinos in Mississippi
