= Hollywood Casino Perryville =

Casino in Maryland, United States

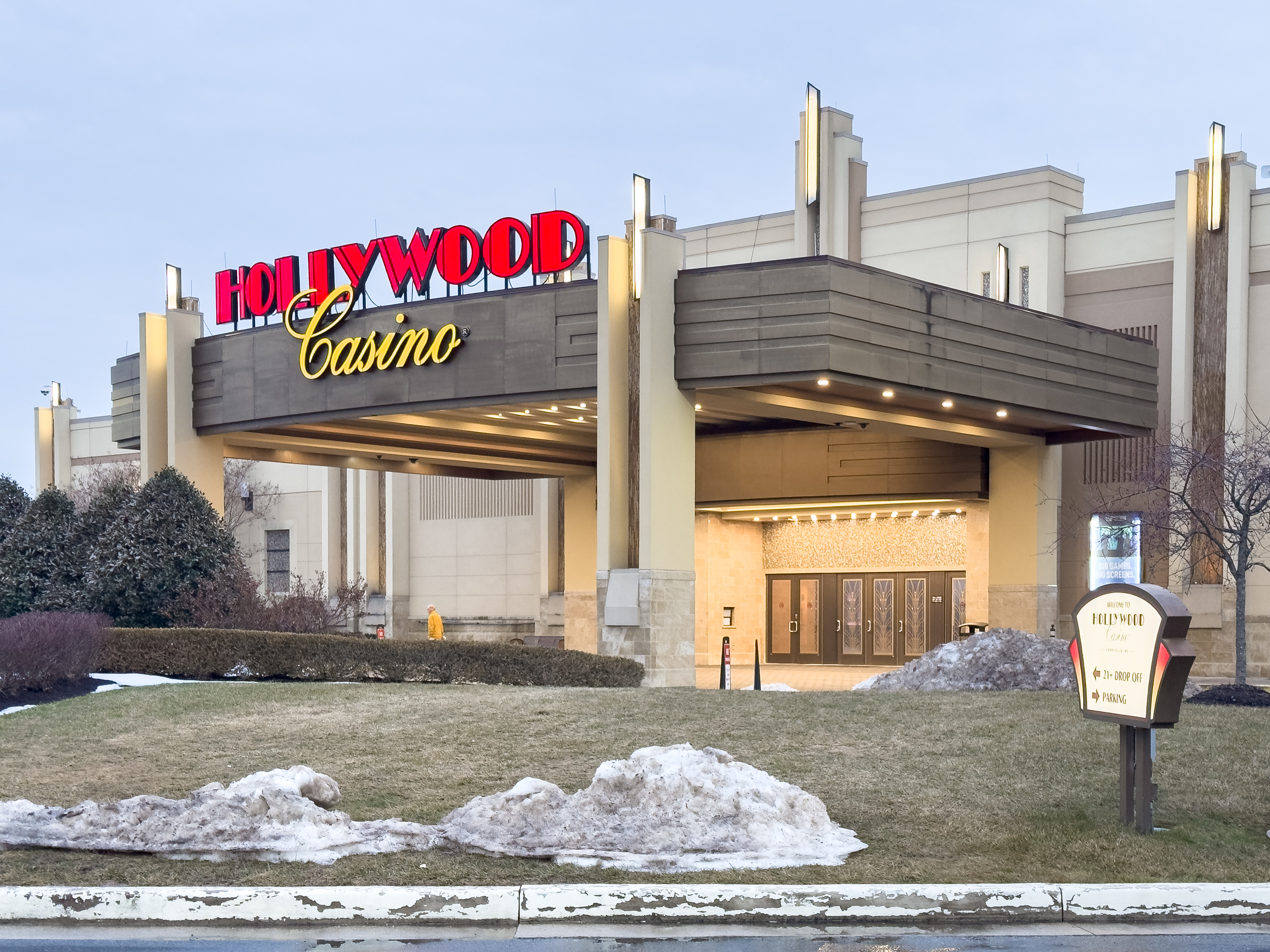
- (2026)

- Hollywood Casino Perryville in Maryland Hollywood Casino Perryville (the United States)
- Interactive map of Hollywood Casino Perryville
- Location: Perryville, Maryland (United States); 39°35′47″N 76°4′22″W
- Opened: September 17, 2010
- Gaming space: 75,000 sq ft (7,000 m^{2})
- Casino type: Land-based
- Owner: Gaming and Leisure Properties
- Operating license holder: Penn Entertainment
- Website: hollywoodcasinoperryville.com

Hollywood Casino Perryville is a casino in Perryville, Maryland, owned by Gaming and Leisure Properties (GLP) and operated by Penn Entertainment. It was the first casino to open in the state on September 17, 2010. It has a gaming floor of 75,000 sq ft (7,000 m^{2}), with over 1,500 slot machines. It also offers table games such as blackjack, craps, and roulette. There is a 10 table poker room near the casino's entrance.

Hollywood Casino Perryville competes with casinos in Delaware, Pennsylvania, and Atlantic City.

Penn National Gaming (now Penn Entertainment) purchased the casino's operating business from GLP in 2021 for $31 million, and leased the property from GLP for $7.8 million per year. Penn National bought the casino in hopes of entering the online betting market in Maryland, where voters had legalized sports betting in 2020.

== See also ==
- List of casinos in Maryland
