= Ameristar Black Hawk =

Casino and hotel in Colorado

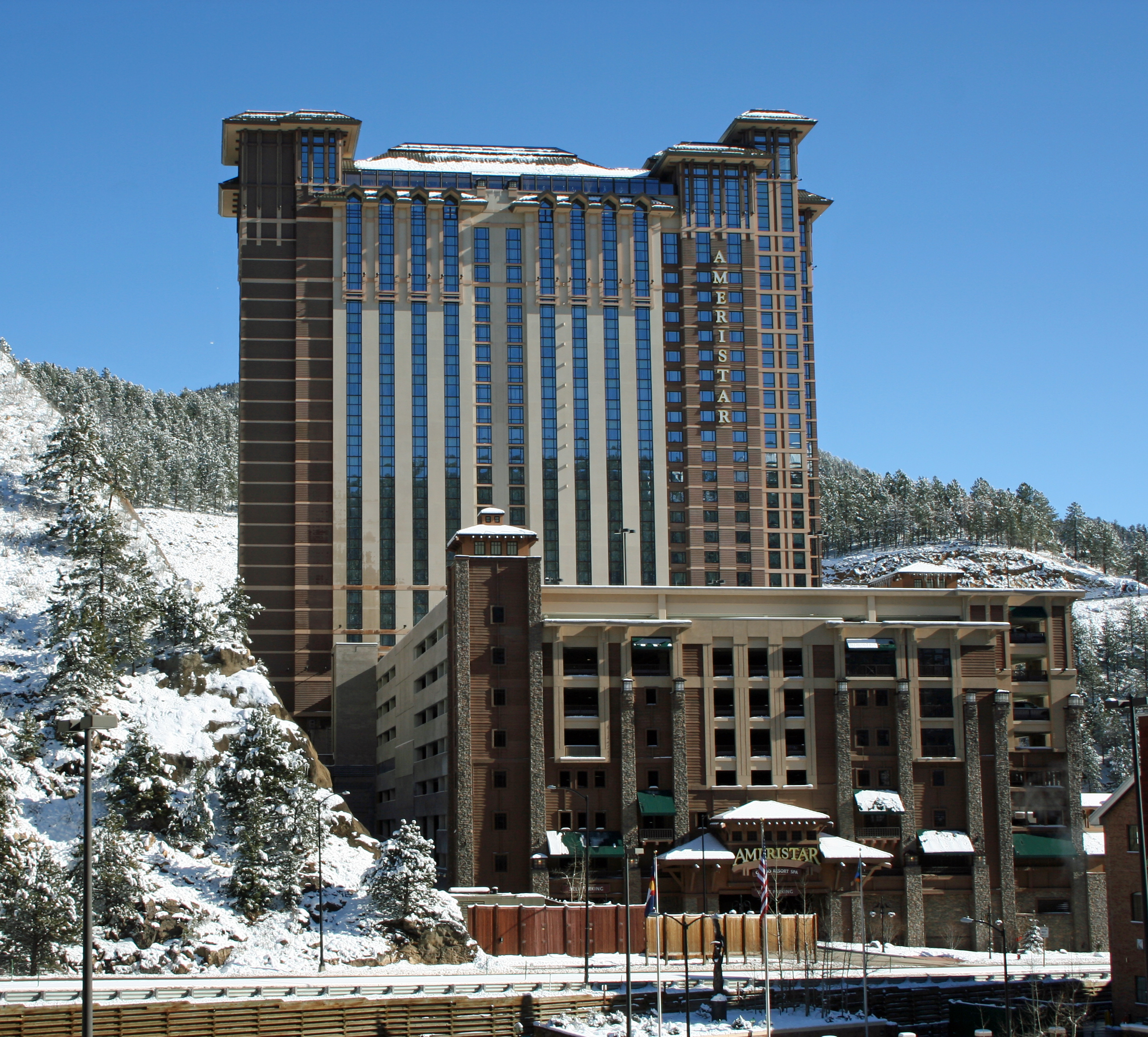
- The property as seen in 2009
- Interactive map of Ameristar Black Hawk
- Location: Black Hawk, Colorado; 111 Richman Street; 39°48′02″N 105°29′33″W
- Opened: December 20, 2001
- No. of rooms: 536
- Gaming space: 57,000 sq ft (5,300 m^{2})
- Casino type: Land-based
- Owner: Gaming and Leisure Properties
- Operating license holder: Penn Entertainment
- Previous names: Black Hawk Casino by Hyatt; Mountain High Casino
- Website: ameristarblackhawk.com

Ameristar Casino Resort Spa Black Hawk is a casino and hotel in Black Hawk, Colorado, owned by Gaming and Leisure Properties and operated by Penn Entertainment.

== History ==
Plans for the casino were revealed in 1997 by Windsor Woodmont, a company formed by several Dallas-based real estate developers. Hyatt Hotels was tapped to manage the casino. Excavation work on the site began in August 1998, but stalled later that year, reportedly because of financing problems related to the arrival of two other large casinos in Black Hawk (the Lodge and the Isle of Capri). Construction resumed in 2000.

The casino opened on December 20, 2001, as the Black Hawk Casino by Hyatt. At opening, it was the largest casino in Colorado, with 57,000 square feet (5,300 m^{2}) of gaming space, containing 1,332 slot machines, 16 blackjack tables and 6 poker tables. The casino was designed as the first phase of a destination resort, with later additions planned to include a 350-suite hotel tower, a convention center, nightclubs, a spa, and a mountaintop recreation park connected to the casino by a gondola lift.

Revenue in the casino's first year fell short of expectations. As a result, Windsor Woodmont defaulted on payments towards $100 million of bonds that had been issued to finance the construction. Bondholders soon moved to foreclose on the casino, forcing the company to file for Chapter 11 bankruptcy protection in November 2002. The next year, Hyatt's management agreement was terminated, the casino's name was changed to the Mountain High Casino, and Windsor Woodmont took over operations. Ameristar Casinos bought the property out of bankruptcy in 2004 for $117 million in cash plus $2.5 million in stock. It was rebranded under the Ameristar name in 2006, following an $80-million renovation.

A hotel tower with 536 rooms was added in 2009 at a cost of $235 million.

Pinnacle Entertainment acquired Ameristar Casinos in 2013. In 2016, Gaming and Leisure Properties bought most of Pinnacle's real estate assets, including Ameristar Black Hawk, in a leaseback transaction. In 2018, Penn National Gaming (now Penn Entertainment) acquired the property's operations as part of its acquisition of Pinnacle. In November 2020, Ameristar opened a Barstool Sportsbook retail kiosk, the first sportsbook branded under the Barstool Sports name, following Penn National acquiring a stake in the sports blog company.

== See also ==
- List of casinos in Colorado
