= Resorts International Holdings =

American casino company (2000–2014)

- Company type: Public
- Industry: Gambling, Hotels, Entertainment
- Founded: 2000
- Defunct: 2014
- Headquarters: Las Vegas, Nevada, United States
- Products: Casinos, Hotels
- Owner: Colony NorthStar

Resorts International Holdings, LLC (RIH), also known as Colony Resorts Holdings (CRH) was an affiliate of Colony NorthStar based in Las Vegas, Nevada. As of 2005, they were the fifth largest gaming company in America under Nick Ribis.

RIH was created by Colony Capital (now known as Colony NorthStar) in 2000 after it purchased Resorts Atlantic City from Sun International for $144 million and continued to grow its portfolio through the acquisition of properties that were in decline. Further acquisitions in partnership with Colony included the Las Vegas Hilton, Bally's Tunica, Resorts Casino Tunica, Ameristar Casino East Chicago and Atlantic City Hilton.

After selling Resorts East Chicago to Ameristar and losing Resorts Atlantic City in bankruptcy, RIH was in decline. It lost its last casino, the Atlantic Club Casino in bankruptcy in 2014.
