= Ameristar Casino Council Bluffs =

Ameristar Casino Hotel Council Bluffs
- Interactive map of Ameristar Casino Hotel Council Bluffs
- Location: Council Bluffs, IA; 2200 River Rd; 41°14′35″N 95°54′36″W
- Opened: January 1996
- No. of rooms: 160
- Gaming space: 38,500 sq ft (3,580 m^{2})
- Casino type: Riverboat
- Owner: Gaming and Leisure Properties
- Operating license holder: Penn Entertainment
- Website: CouncilBluffs.Ameristar.com

Ameristar Casino Hotel Council Bluffs is a riverboat casino in Council Bluffs, Iowa, on the Missouri River directly across from Omaha, Nebraska. It is owned by Gaming and Leisure Properties and operated by Penn Entertainment.

The property includes 38,500 sq. ft. of gaming space with more than 1,500 slot machines and table games, a 160-room hotel tower, and several restaurants.

== History ==
Ameristar Council Bluffs opened for business in January 1996. The plans called for a resort that complemented the local history, thus, the design is reminiscent of an 1800s river town. The riverboat itself is a 272 foot long and 98 foot wide vessel. Due to legal requirements at the time, the riverboat had to make 2-hour cruises down the river during excursion season, which had been April 1 to October 31.

The property had been owned by Ameristar Casinos until the company was acquired by Pinnacle Entertainment in 2013. Pinnacle was then acquired by Pennsylvania-based Penn National Gaming (now Penn Entertainment) in 2018.

It is the only casino in Council Bluffs out of the three that is still on a riverboat. Harrah's scrapped theirs and moved the casino onto land in the same general location in 2013 after a 2007 Iowa law allowed for land-based casinos.
