= Harrah's Casino Tunica =

Defunct resort at Tunica Resorts, Mississippi (1996–2014)

Coordinates: 34.855613°N 90.294544°W

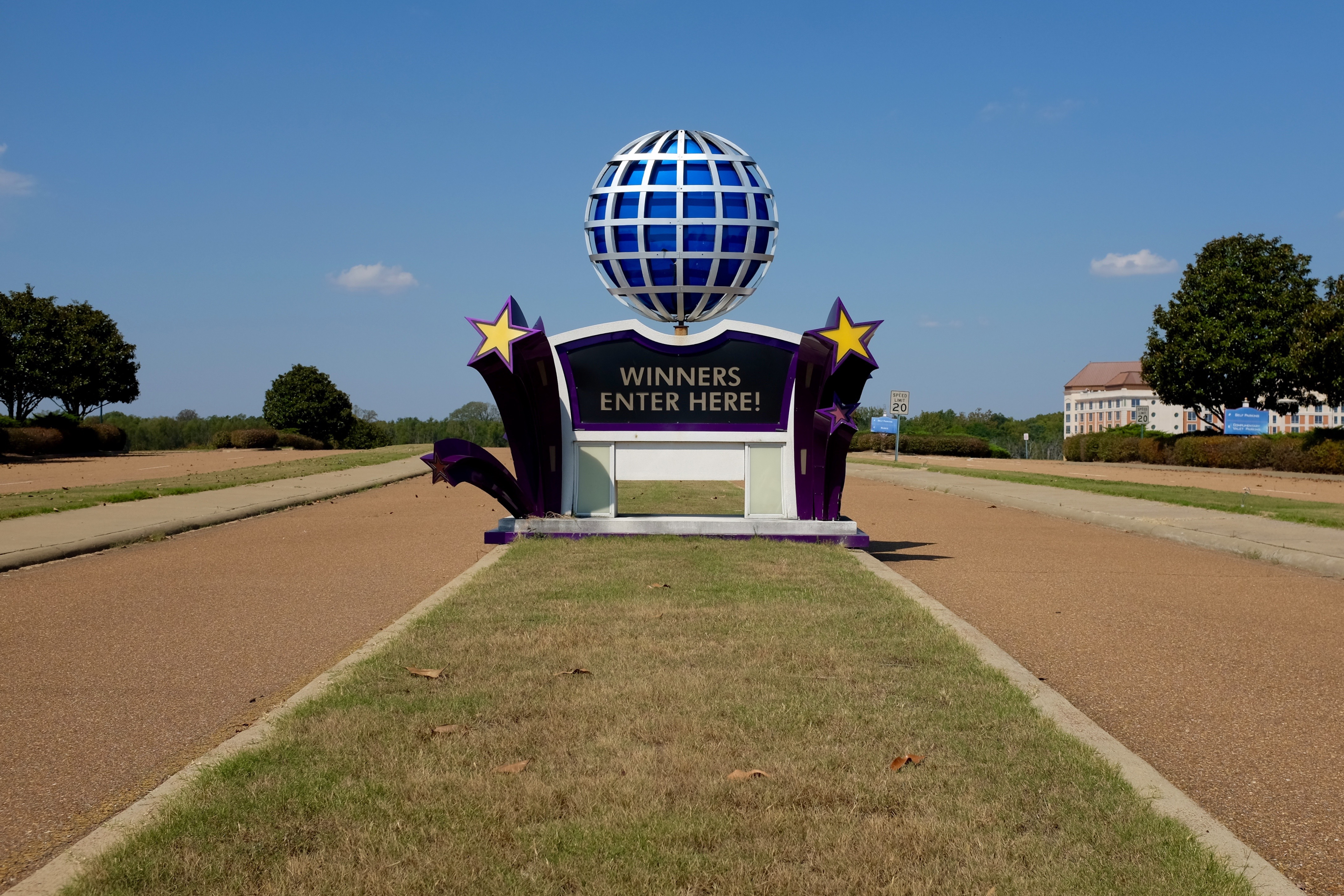
- Entrance to the abandoned Harrah's Casino Tunica
- Interactive map of Harrah's Casino Tunica
- Location: Tunica Resorts, Mississippi; 13615 Old Highway 61 N
- Opened: 1996
- Closed: June 2, 2014
- Theme: Mardi Gras
- No. of rooms: 1,356
- Gaming space: 140,000 sq ft (13,000 m^{2})
- Signature attractions: Bellissimo Spa & Salon
- Notable restaurants: '37 Steakhouse, Toby Keith's I Love This Bar & Grill, Paula Deen's Buffet
- Casino type: Riverboat casino
- Owner: Caesars Entertainment
- Previous names: Grand Casino Tunica (1996–2007)

Harrah's Casino Tunica, formerly Grand Casino Tunica, was a casino and resort located in Tunica Resorts, Mississippi. It was owned and operated by Caesars Entertainment. The casino offered a 140,000 sq ft (13,000 m^{2}) casino and three hotels with a total of 1,356 rooms. There was also an RV park, the Bellissimo Spa & Salon, a convention center, The Willows sporting clays shotgun club, and a 2,500 seat entertainment venue called the Harrah's Event Center.

Citing steadily declining business rates in its last few years, Caesars announced the closure of Harrah's Casino Tunica, along with its hotels, golf course, and events center in March 2014. The casino was closed permanently on June 2, 2014 and was demolished in August 2015. As of December 2020, the three hotel buildings remained standing, but have not operated since the resort's closure in 2014. The golf course and events center were also abandoned. Caesars rented out one hotel and its parking lot to an auction company to have live auctions for farm equipment and other large items.

In 2021 a plan was announced to redevelop the property.

== History ==
=== Grand Casino Tunica (1996-2007) ===
The casino itself was built in 1996. It was the largest casino between Las Vegas and Atlantic City, featuring a large poker room. The Harrah's Casino Hotel was directly connected to the casino and contained 148 rooms and 40 suites. Two additional hotels were situated along a lake approximately ½ mile away. Complimentary shuttle service ran 24 hours a day to take guests to and from the casino. The Veranda Resort Hotel, which opened in 1996 along with the casino, contained 532 rooms and 36 suites. The largest hotel was the Terrace Hotel & Spa, which opened in 1999 and contained 563 rooms and 37 suites.

Grand Casino Tunica's original owner was Grand Casinos, Inc., headed by Lyle Berman, a pioneer in developing resort-style casinos on Native American reservations and in Mississippi.

In 1998, Berman and Grand Casinos, Inc., sold their Tunica, and Biloxi, Mississippi resorts to the gaming division of Hilton Hotels, with the combined assets being spun off to create a new corporation called Park Place Entertainment (later renamed Caesars Entertainment).

In 2005, Caesars Entertainment was acquired by Harrah's Entertainment, which converted back to the Caesars Entertainment name in 2010. In the Tunica market, Caesars also operates Horseshoe Casino Tunica and Tunica Roadhouse Casino & Hotel (formerly Sheraton). The three properties share management and player marketing operations.

=== Harrah's Casino Tunica (2007-2014) ===
In October 2007, Harrah's officials announced that Grand Casino Tunica would undergo a $45 million renovation of its hotels and casinos, which included the resort being renamed Harrah's Casino Tunica. In addition, the company announced that the new Harrah's would feature a new buffet bearing the name of Food Network celebrity chef Paula Deen. Paula Deen's Buffet was reported to be the first celebrity chef-branded buffet at an American casino. It was rebranded in 2013 shortly after she was removed from Food Network.

A Toby Keith's I Love This Bar & Grill owned by Scottsdale, Arizona-based Capri Restaurant Group Enterprises LLC opened in Harrah's in September 2010, replacing the former Replays bar and grill and Murano's Italian Restaurant.

== Previous Harrah's Casinos in Tunica ==
This is the third casino in Tunica Resorts to bear the name Harrah's. The previous Harrah's Tunica was designed by Steelman Partners. The first was located just off Casino Strip Blvd., several miles south of the former Grand, and was the first casino to open in that area in 1993. In 1996, Harrah's acquired the shuttered Southern Belle Casino, approximately 500 yards (450 m) away from the first Harrah's. The company operated both casinos as Harrah's for a short time, calling the second property "Harrah's Mardi Gras." Eventually, Harrah's sold the original property to Isle of Capri Casinos, who operated it as "Isle of Capri Tunica" for a short time before closing it.

With the sale of Caesars to Harrah's in 2004, the combined companies were forced to sell two properties to avoid owning five of the nine casinos in the Tunica market. Harrah's Mardi Gras was sold, along with Bally's Casino Tunica, to Colony Capital, and Harrah's Mardi Gras was renamed Resorts Casino Tunica.

== See also ==
- List of Caesars Entertainment properties
- List of casinos in Mississippi
