= Ameristar Casino East Chicago =

Riverboat casino in East Chicago

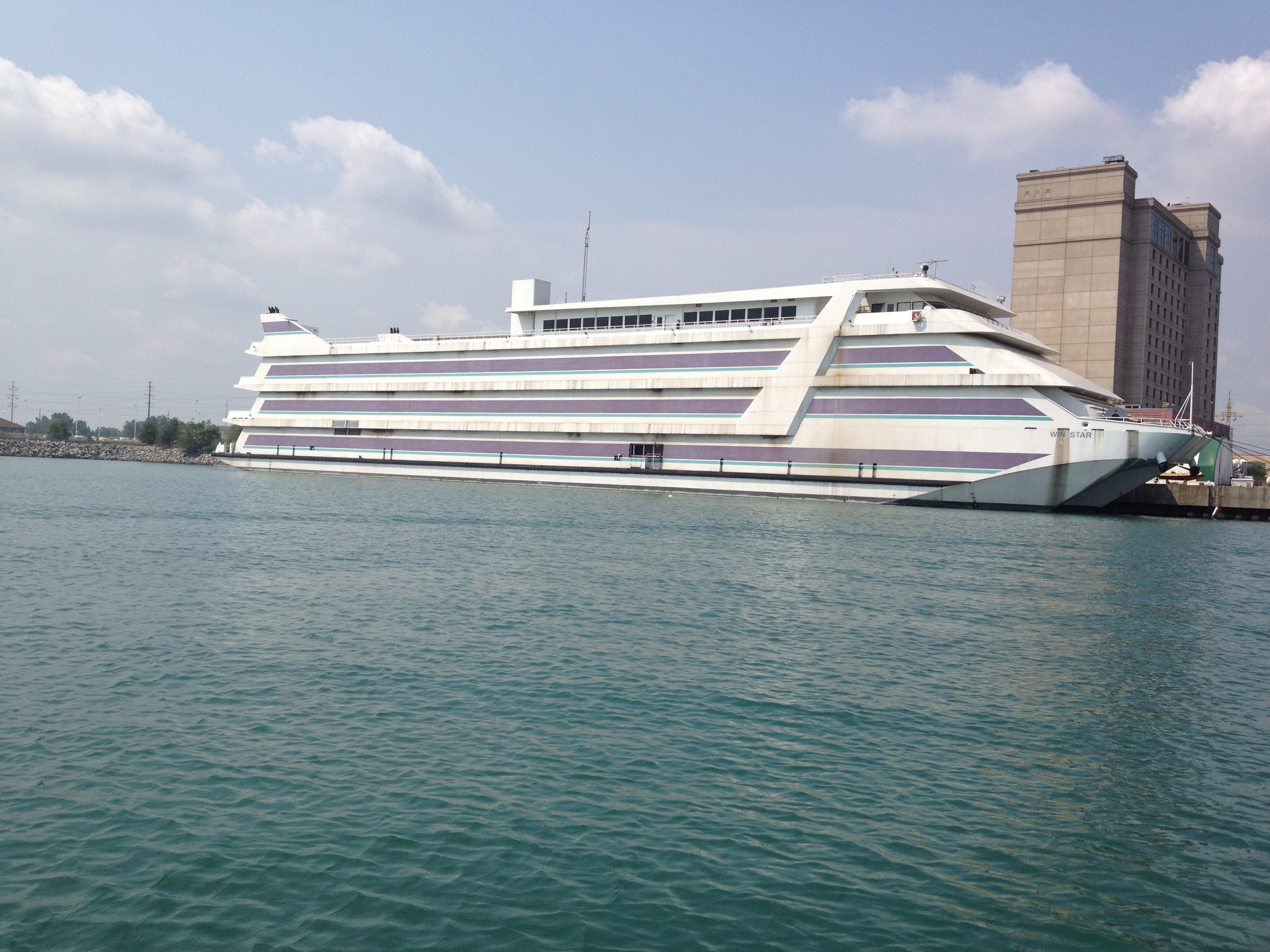
- The Win Star vessel hosts the casino (view from Lake Michigan)
- Interactive map of Ameristar Casino Hotel East Chicago
- Location: East Chicago, Indiana; 777 Ameristar Blvd; 41.652467°N 87.436240°W
- Opened: April 18, 1997
- No. of rooms: 288
- Casino type: Riverboat
- Owner: Gaming and Leisure Properties
- Operating license holder: Penn Entertainment
- Previous names: Showboat Mardi Gras; Harrah's East Chicago; Resorts East Chicago
- Website: ameristareastchicago.com

Ameristar Casino Hotel East Chicago (formerly Showboat Mardi Gras Casino, Harrah's East Chicago, and Resorts East Chicago) is a riverboat casino in East Chicago, Indiana, docked at Indiana Harbor on Lake Michigan. It is owned by Gaming and Leisure Properties and operated by Penn Entertainment.

The property features a 56,000-square-foot casino that offers 1,900 slot machines including reels, video reels and video poker; more than 40 table games; a high limit gaming room that is on land adjacent to the riverboat; and a 288-room hotel.

== History ==
Showboat Mardi Gras Casino opened on April 18, 1997. In 1998, Harrah's Entertainment bought Showboat, Inc. and renamed the property as Harrah's East Chicago. Harrah's later sold it to Resorts International Holdings, and the casino's name was changed, along with the street name to 777 Resort Blvd (similar to the addresses used for some Harrah's branded casinos: 777 Harrah's Blvd). It was later sold in 2007 to Ameristar Casinos and changed its name to Ameristar before the September 2008 deadline.

In August 2013, the property became part of Pinnacle Entertainment when that company acquired Ameristar Casinos. In April 2016, the property was sold to Gaming and Leisure Properties along with almost all of Pinnacle's real estate assets, and leased back to Pinnacle.

In October 2018, Penn National Gaming (now Penn Entertainment) acquired the property's operations as part of its acquisition of Pinnacle.

== Vessel ==
The Win Star is the vessel that hosts the casino. The vessel uses a diesel reduction propulsion system and has a length of 332.2 feet. The boat's gross tons is 2803.0 and net tons measures 1906.0. It was built in 1997 by Atlantic Marine, Inc.
