= Live! Casino & Hotel Maryland =

Resort in Anne Arundel County, Maryland, U.S.

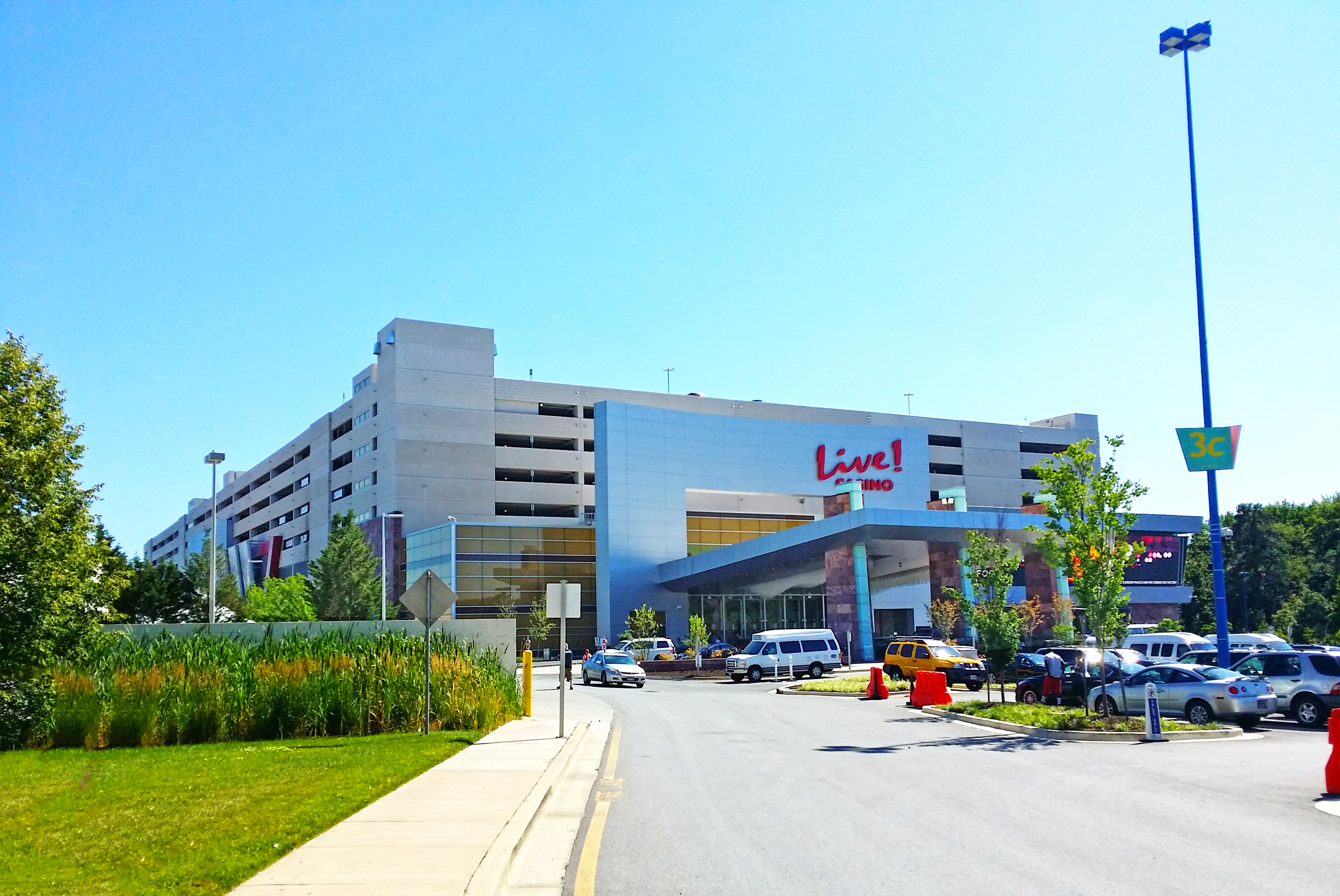
- Exterior view of the Live! Casino & Hotel in July 2014, then known as the Maryland Live! Casino

- Live! Casino & Hotel in Maryland Live! Casino & Hotel Maryland (the United States)
- Interactive map of Live! Casino & Hotel Maryland
- Location: Hanover, Maryland, U.S.; 7002 Arundel Mills Circle, 21076; 39.157226°N 76.727042°W
- Opened: June 6, 2012; 14 years ago (Maryland Live! Casino); June 2018; 8 years ago (Live! Hotel)
- No. of rooms: 318 (Live! Hotel)
- Notable restaurants: The Cheesecake Factory; Bobby's Burger Palace; Phillips Seafood; The Prime Rib
- Casino type: Land-based
- Owner: Gaming and Leisure Properties
- Operating license holder: The Cordish Companies
- Previous names: Maryland Live! Casino (2012–2018)
- Website: livech.com/maryland

Live! Casino & Hotel Maryland, formerly Maryland Live! Casino, is a casino hotel in Hanover, Maryland, United States, adjacent to Arundel Mills Mall. It is owned by Gaming and Leisure Properties and operated by The Cordish Companies. It opened in 2012, and was the first "Live!"-branded casino developed by Cordish. While Seminole Hard Rock Hotel & Casino Hollywood and Seminole Hard Rock Hotel & Casino Tampa are older Cordish casino hotels, they were not Live!-branded.

The casino has over 3,900 slot machines and electronic table games, 189 live table games, and 52 poker tables. There is parking for 5,000 vehicles in a six-story parking garage. At 17 stories, the hotel is the tallest building in Anne Arundel County.

== History ==
=== 2008–2012: Development and opening ===
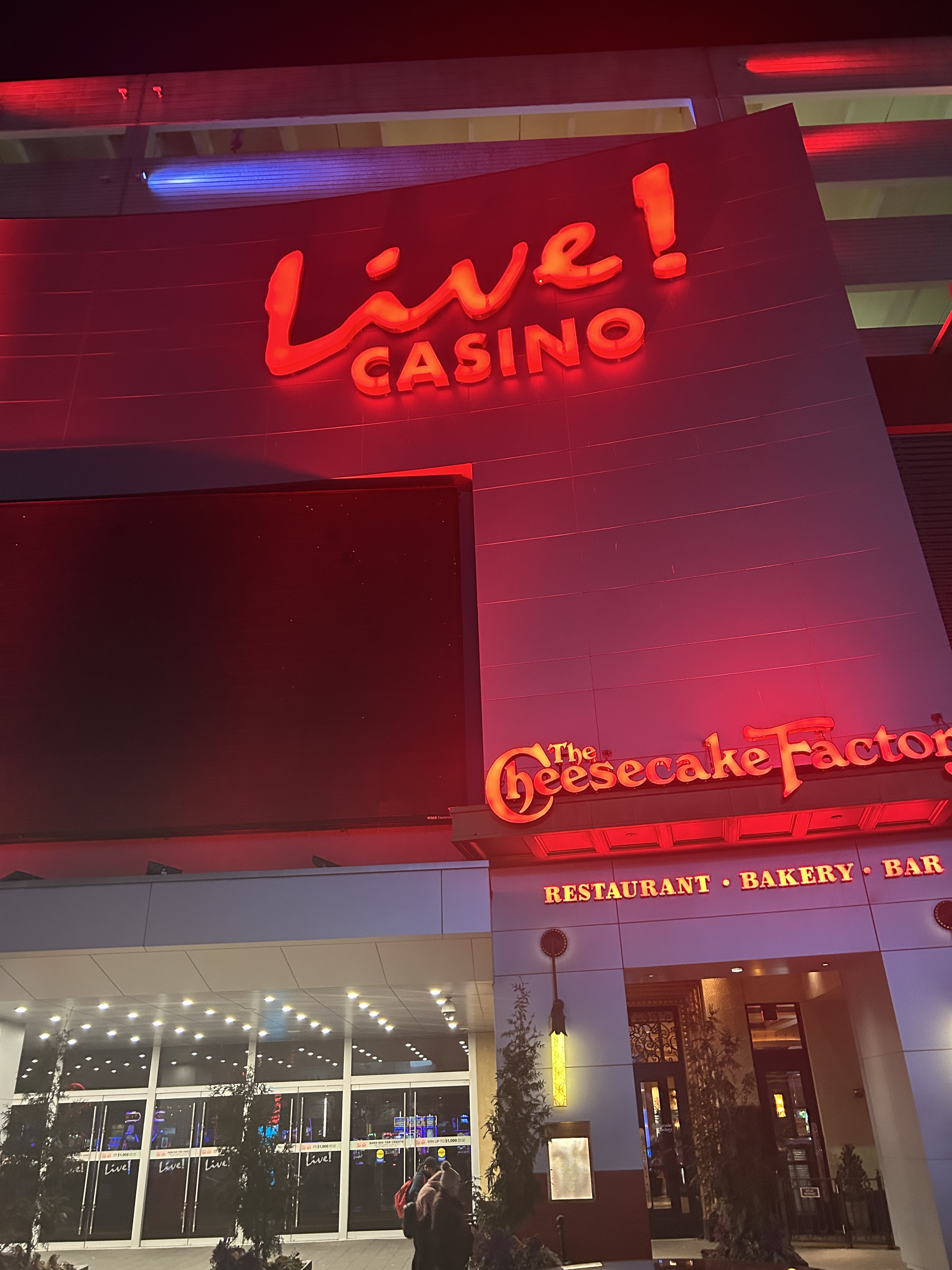
Exterior of the Live! Casino & Hotel at night in March 2026

After Maryland voters approved slot machine gambling in Maryland in 2008, The Cordish Companies planned a slots parlor next to the Arundel Mills mall in partnership with its owners, Simon Property Group. The proposal for slots at Arundel Mills was on the ballot as a referendum in the November 2010 elections; the referendum passed, and construction began on the casino shortly afterward, with the grand opening of its first phase held on June 6, 2012. On its grand opening, Maryland Live! Casino included 3,200 slot machines and electronic table games, and the casino was constructed on a former parking lot.

Live! Casino & Hotel includes several dining options, including The Cheesecake Factory; KOHO Korean BBQ; and a Prime Rib steakhouse. The project was to feature an Obrycki's Crab House and Seafood Restaurant, though the restaurant announced in November 2011 that it would not be opening a location there. Instead, Phillips Seafood opened a location at the site. Live! Casino & Hotel had a live music venue, operated by Annapolis-based Rams Head, which includes fixed seating for approximately 300 in a cabaret-style design with several stepped viewing levels of the stage.

The second phase opened in September 2012, bringing the total to 4,750 machines.

=== After opening ===
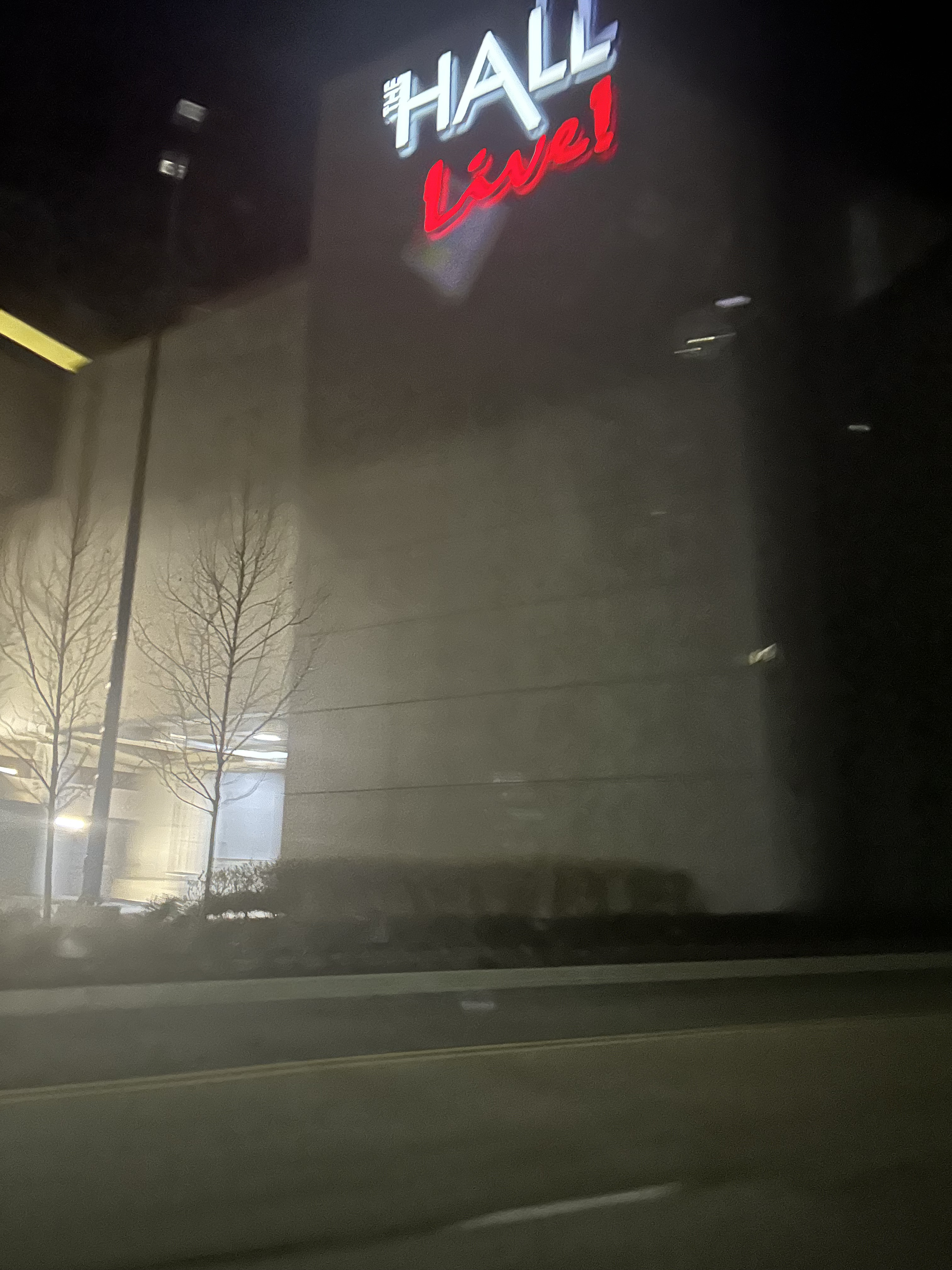
The Hall at Live! in March 2026 at night

Since full completion in September 2012, Live! Casino & Hotel has about 380,000 sq. ft. of floor space and 4,750 gaming slots. Live! Casino & Hotel is a free-standing facility, separated from Arundel Mills by the inner mall ring road.

The casino is within walking distance of the food court entrance. Live! Casino & Hotel includes a 5,000-space parking structure at Arundel Mills with a "smart park" green-and-red-light space availability feature, such as the system used at nearby BWI Airport. Parking is available free of charge during all mall hours for Arundel Mills shoppers.

In December 2012, Maryland Live! transitioned to being open 24 hours a day, 365 days a year. In April 2013, Maryland Live! debuted 122 table games to complement its electronic games and slot machines. A 52-table poker room opened in August 2013.

A 310-room hotel and conference center opened on June 6, 2018, on a site adjacent to the casino building. In 2019, The Hall at Live! concert venue (stylized as The HALL at Live!) officially opened, replacing the Live! Center Stage.

In December 2021, Cordish sold the land and buildings to Gaming and Leisure Properties (GLP) in a leaseback transaction for $1.14 billion in cash, stock, and assumed debt. Cordish would pay $75 million of annual rent for the property. On June 4, 2026, Louis Vuitton sued Cordish for "ripping off" the company's logo on the casino hotel's bags and other merchandise for members earning casino rewards.

== See also ==
- List of casinos in Maryland
