= Hollywood Casino Gulf Coast =

Hotel-casino complex in Mississippi, US

Coordinates: 30°20′7″N 89°21′16″W

- Interactive map of Hollywood Casino Gulf Coast
- Location: Bay St. Louis, Mississippi; 711 Hollywood Blvd.
- Opened: September 30, 1992
- Theme: Hollywood
- No. of rooms: 291
- Gaming space: 39,500 sq ft (3,670 m^{2})
- Permanent shows: Pete Fountain
- Notable restaurants: Bogarts Steakhouse
- Casino type: Water-Based
- Owner: Gaming and Leisure Properties
- Operating license holder: Penn Entertainment
- Previous names: Casino Magic Bay St. Louis
- Renovated in: 2006
- Website: hollywoodgulfcoast.com

Hollywood Casino Gulf Coast (formerly Casino Magic Bay St. Louis) is a casino hotel complex in Bay St. Louis, Mississippi, owned by Gaming and Leisure Properties and operated by Penn Entertainment.

== History ==
Casino Magic Bay St. Louis former logo

The property was first opened by Casino Magic Corp. as Casino Magic Bay St. Louis, which was largely destroyed by Hurricane Katrina. Its gaming barge floated over 7 mi (11 km) away and ended up in a forest. The ballroom at Casino Magic hosted the Heroes of Wrestling pay-per-view in 1999 as well as two Ultimate Fighting Championship (UFC) events UFC 15 and UFC 19.

Penn National Gaming (now Penn Entertainment) bought it from Pinnacle Entertainment in 2002 and renamed it Hollywood in 2006. The casino is popular among locals for its marina, RV park, and award-winning golf course (The Bridges) designed by Arnold Palmer.

Events and tenants
Preceded by Boutwell Memorial Auditorium; Pontchartrain Center	Ultimate Fighting Championship venue UFC 15; UFC 19	Succeeded by Yokohama Arena; Boutwell Memorial Auditorium
