= L'Auberge Baton Rouge =

L'Auberge Casino & Hotel Baton Rouge
- Interactive map of L'Auberge Casino & Hotel Baton Rouge
- Location: Baton Rouge, Louisiana; 14777 River Road; 30.3458°N 91.1513°W
- Opened: September 2012
- Gaming space: 74,000 sq ft (6,900 m^{2})
- Casino type: Dockside
- Owner: Gaming and Leisure Properties
- Operating license holder: Penn Entertainment
- Website: lbatonrouge.com

L'Auberge Casino & Hotel Baton Rouge is a casino in Baton Rouge, Louisiana. The casino opened in September 2012, and has 74,000 square feet (6,900 m^{2}) of gaming space. It is owned by Gaming and Leisure Properties and operated by Penn Entertainment.

The casino has 1,500 slot machines, 50 table games, and a poker room. The hotel has 12 stories, 205 rooms, a rooftop pool, and a fitness center.

In April 2016, Pinnacle Entertainment sold the property to Gaming and Leisure Properties and leased it back, along with almost all of Pinnacle's real estate assets. Penn National Gaming (now Penn Entertainment) acquired Pinnacle in October 2018, including the operations of L'Auberge Baton Rouge.
