= Hollywood Casino Aurora =

Riverboat casino in Illinois, U.S.

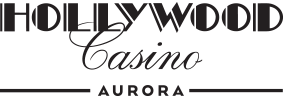

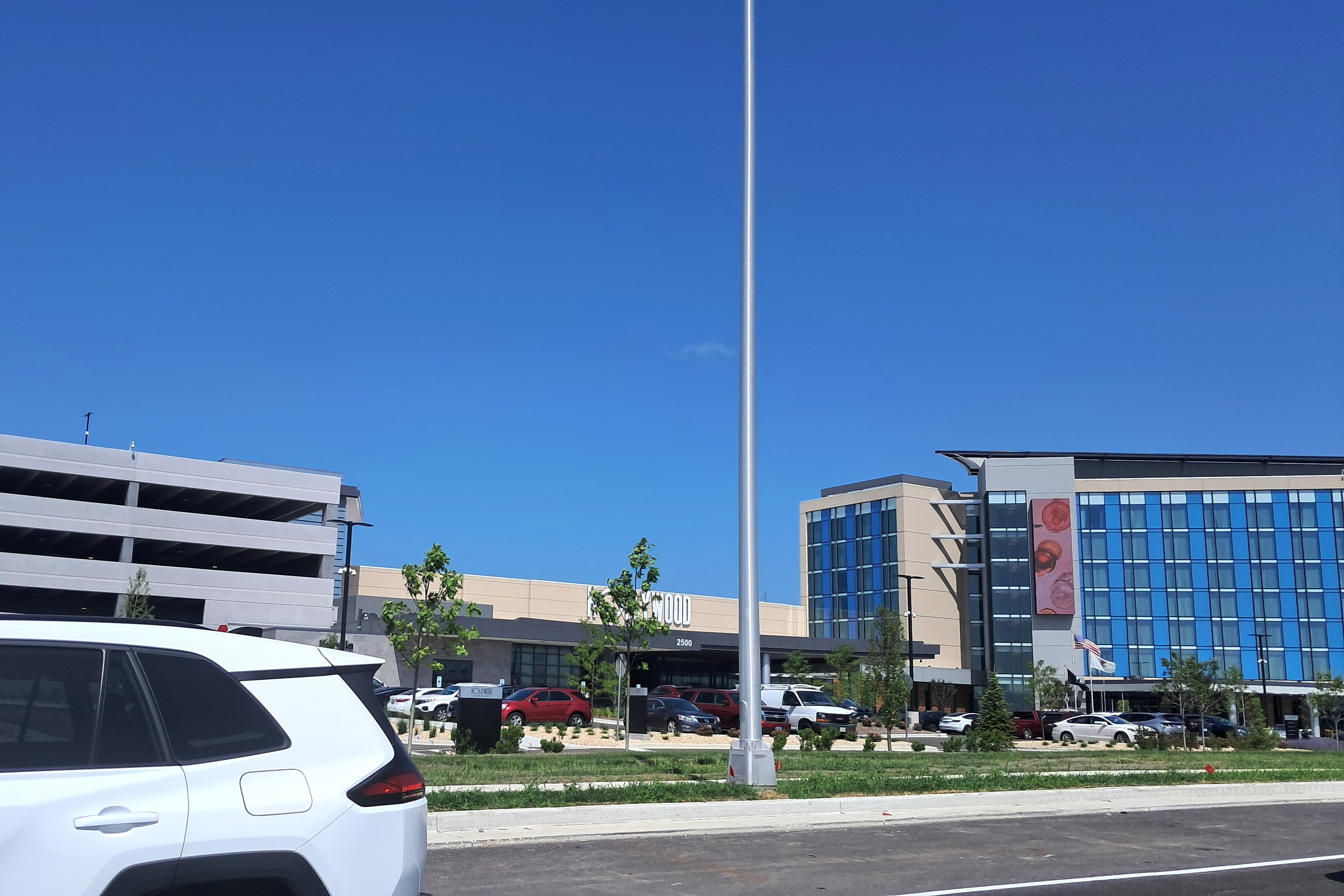
- Hollywood Casino in July 2026.
- Interactive map of Hollywood Casino Aurora
- Location: Aurora, Illinois; 2500 N Farnsworth Ave; 41°48′18″N 88°17′1″W
- Opened: June 17, 1993; 33 years ago (riverboat); June 24, 2026; 3 months ago (land-based)
- Closed: June 10, 2026; 3 months ago (riverboat)
- Owner: Gaming and Leisure Properties
- Operating license holder: Penn Entertainment
- Public transit access: Pace
- Website: pennentertainment.com/hollywood-aurora

Hollywood Casino Aurora is a casino located in Aurora, Illinois, a western suburb of Chicago. The casino opened on June 17, 1993, as a riverboat casino on the Fox River. The riverboat casino was closed on June 10, 2026, in favor of a land-based casino at Farnsworth Avenue, which opened weeks later on June 24, 2026. It is owned by Gaming and Leisure Properties and operated by Penn Entertainment.

== History ==
=== Riverboat casino ===
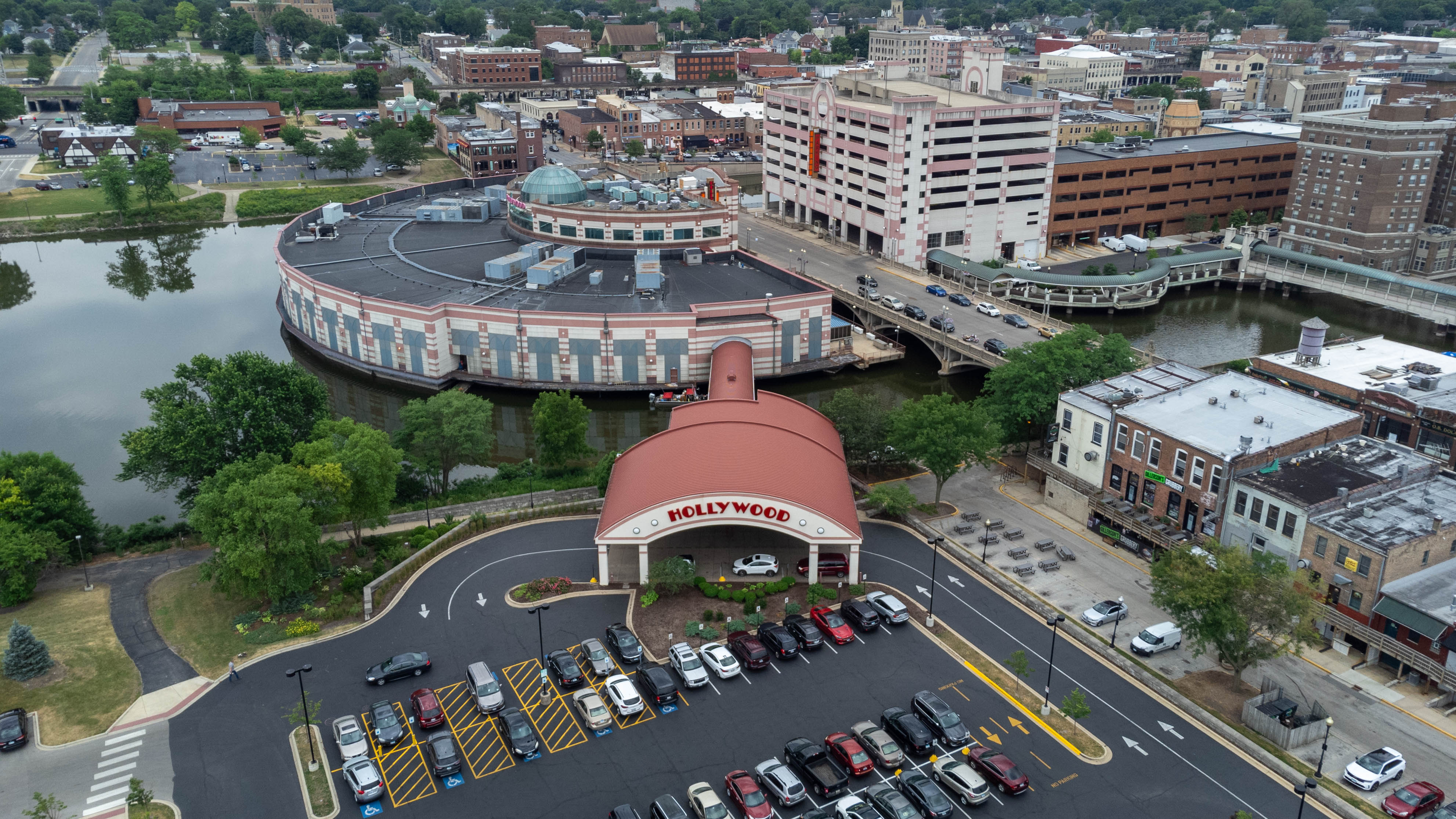
Original location of Hollywood Casino Aurora

Hollywood Casino Aurora opened on June 17, 1993, as the first riverboat casino under Hollywood Casino Corp. Construction of the casino costed $70 million. The casino's ownership transferred to Penn National Gaming (now Penn Entertainment) after its acquisition of Hollywood Casino Corp. in 2003.

The casino originally operated on two riverboats. In 2002, the boats were replaced with a floating, moored, half-circle structure with 70,000 square feet (6,500 m^{2}) of space.

The casino had 53,000 square feet of gaming space and over 1,000 slot machines and 26 table games. There was one restaurant on the property, Fairbanks Steakhouse.

In anticipation for the opening of the new casino at Farnsworth Avenue, the riverboat casino was closed on June 10, 2026.

=== Land-based casino ===
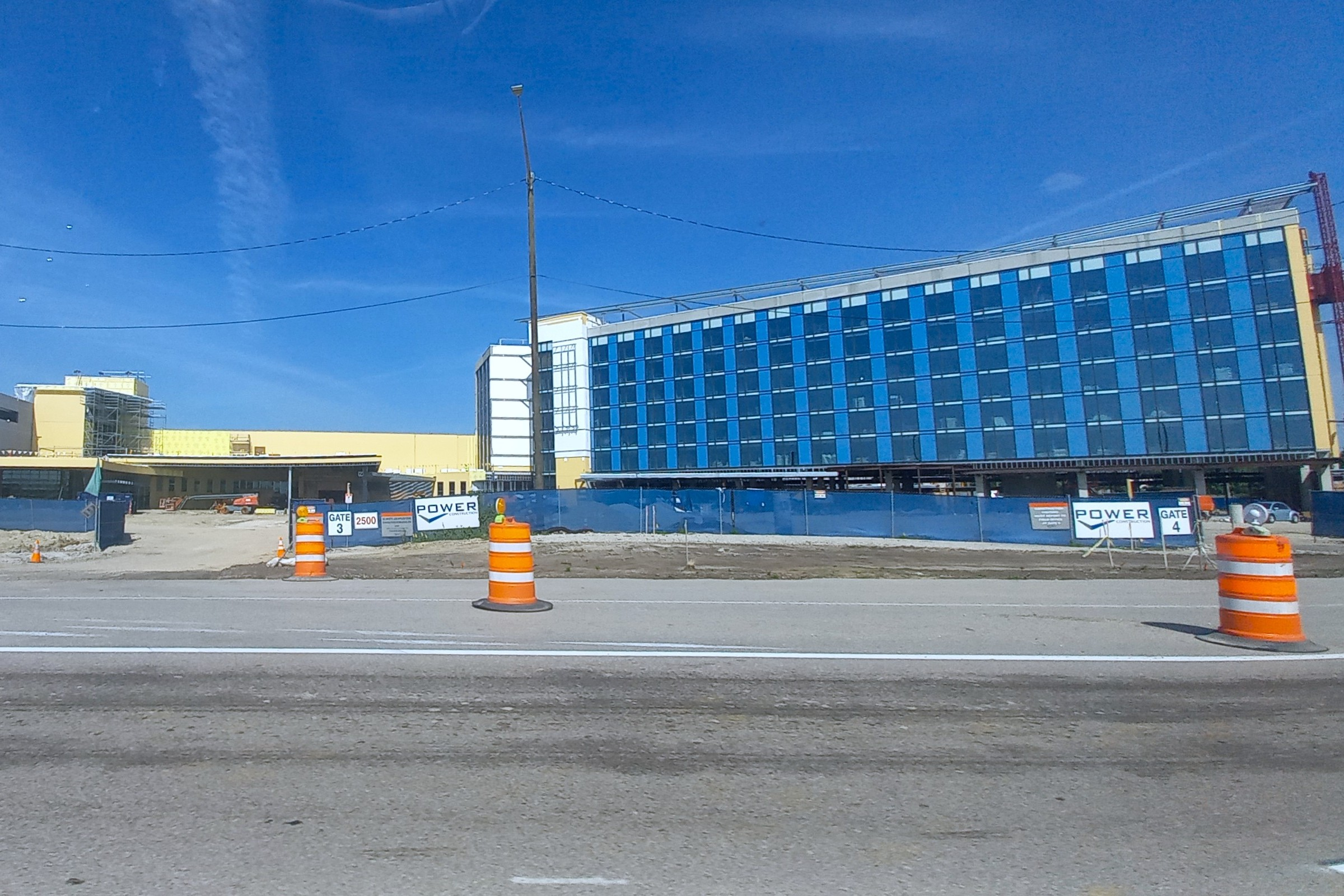
Construction site for the new casino

City officials and Penn National Gaming were pushing for Illinois Senate Bill 516, which would legalize land-based casinos. This push was part of an effort to move the Hollywood Casino Aurora to an area north of Interstate 88 and west of the Chicago Premium Outlets. The provision to legalize land-based casinos, which was under a different bill (Senate Bill 690), was signed on June 28, 2019, as part of Rebuild Illinois. The plan to move Hollywood Casino Aurora was unanimously approved by the Finance Committee of the Aurora City Council on October 13, 2022, and was approved 10–1 by the city council itself on June 27, 2023.

The new casino complex, located on an 18-acre (73,000 m^{2}) area surrounded by Farnsworth Avenue, Corporate Boulevard, Bilter Road, and Church Road, was planned to have over 900 slot machines, 50 table games, and 200 hotel rooms.

A groundbreaking ceremony for the new casino was held on November 29, 2023, at which point the project was expected to cost $360 million. On January 23, 2024, the city council approved 11–1 a 23-year tax increment financing district in the vicinity of the complex except for the Gonella Bread factory.

The new casino opened on June 24, 2026.

== See also ==
- List of casinos in Illinois
