= Argosy Casino Riverside =

Casino in Kansas city

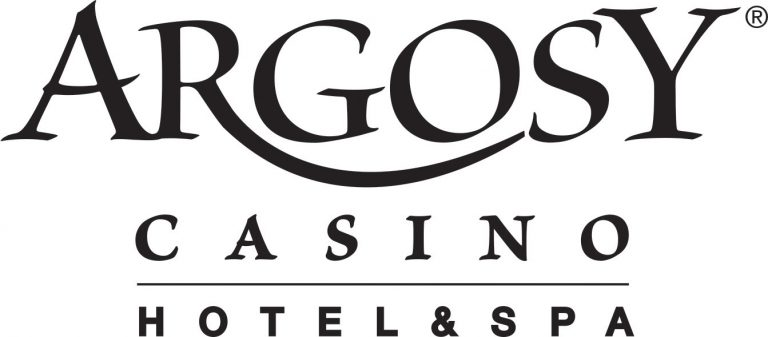
- Interactive map of Argosy Casino Riverside
- Location: Riverside, Missouri; 777 NW Argosy Casino Pkwy; 39°09′37″N 94°37′26″W
- Opened: June 22, 1994 (29 years ago)
- Theme: Mediterranean
- No. of rooms: 258
- Gaming space: 62,000 sq ft (5,800 m^{2})
- Casino type: Riverboat
- Owner: Gaming and Leisure Properties
- Operating license holder: Penn Entertainment
- Previous names: Argosy V
- Website: argosykansascity.com

Argosy Casino Riverside is a riverboat casino located on the Missouri River in Riverside, Missouri, just north of Kansas City. It is one of several casinos in the Kansas City metropolitan area. It is owned by Gaming and Leisure Properties and operated by Penn Entertainment.

== History ==
The casino opened on June 22, 1994 as the Argosy V, Kansas City's first riverboat casino. In 1996, a land-based pavilion was built that included restaurants, bars, and a parking garage. In 2003, the casino was renovated and in 2005 a hotel was added to the property. Penn National Gaming (now Penn Entertainment) acquired the Argosy Gaming Company in 2005.

== Property ==
The casino houses 62,000 square feet (5,800 m^{2}) of gaming space, with 1,500 slot machines and 37 table games. It has a 258-room hotel, several restaurants, and 18,000 square feet (1,700 m^{2}) of meeting space.

== See also ==
- List of casinos in Missouri
