= Argosy Casino Sioux City =

- Interactive map of Argosy Casino Sioux City
- Location: Sioux City, Iowa; 100 Larsen Park Rd; 42°29′22″N 96°25′18″W
- Opened: January 1993
- Closed: July 30, 2014; 11 years ago
- Gaming space: 36,000 sq ft (3,300 m^{2})
- Casino type: Riverboat
- Owner: Penn National Gaming

Argosy Casino Sioux City was a riverboat casino located on the Missouri River in Sioux City, Iowa. It was owned by Penn National Gaming.

== History ==
The first riverboat, the Sioux City Sue, opened in January 1993 after a couple of other licenses for a casino in Sioux City were granted but then later revoked. In 1994, the Sioux City Sue was replaced by the larger Belle of Sioux City. In 2004, the Argosy, which had been in operation for seven years in Kansas City, replaced the Belle of Sioux City. Penn National Gaming acquired the Argosy Gaming Company in October 2005.

On April 17, 2014, the Argosy was ordered to shut down by the Iowa Racing and Gaming Commission because of a violation in state law where the casino failed to partner with a local non-profit group. The Iowa Supreme Court then ordered the casino to close by July 30, 2014. In October 2014, the Argosy IV boat was moved to Wood River, Illinois and docked until 2018, when it was moved to western India to be operated as a casino on the Mandovi River.

== See also ==
- List of casinos in Iowa
