= Tunica Resorts, Mississippi =

Census-designated place in the United States

Tunica Resorts Robinsonville
- Census-designated place
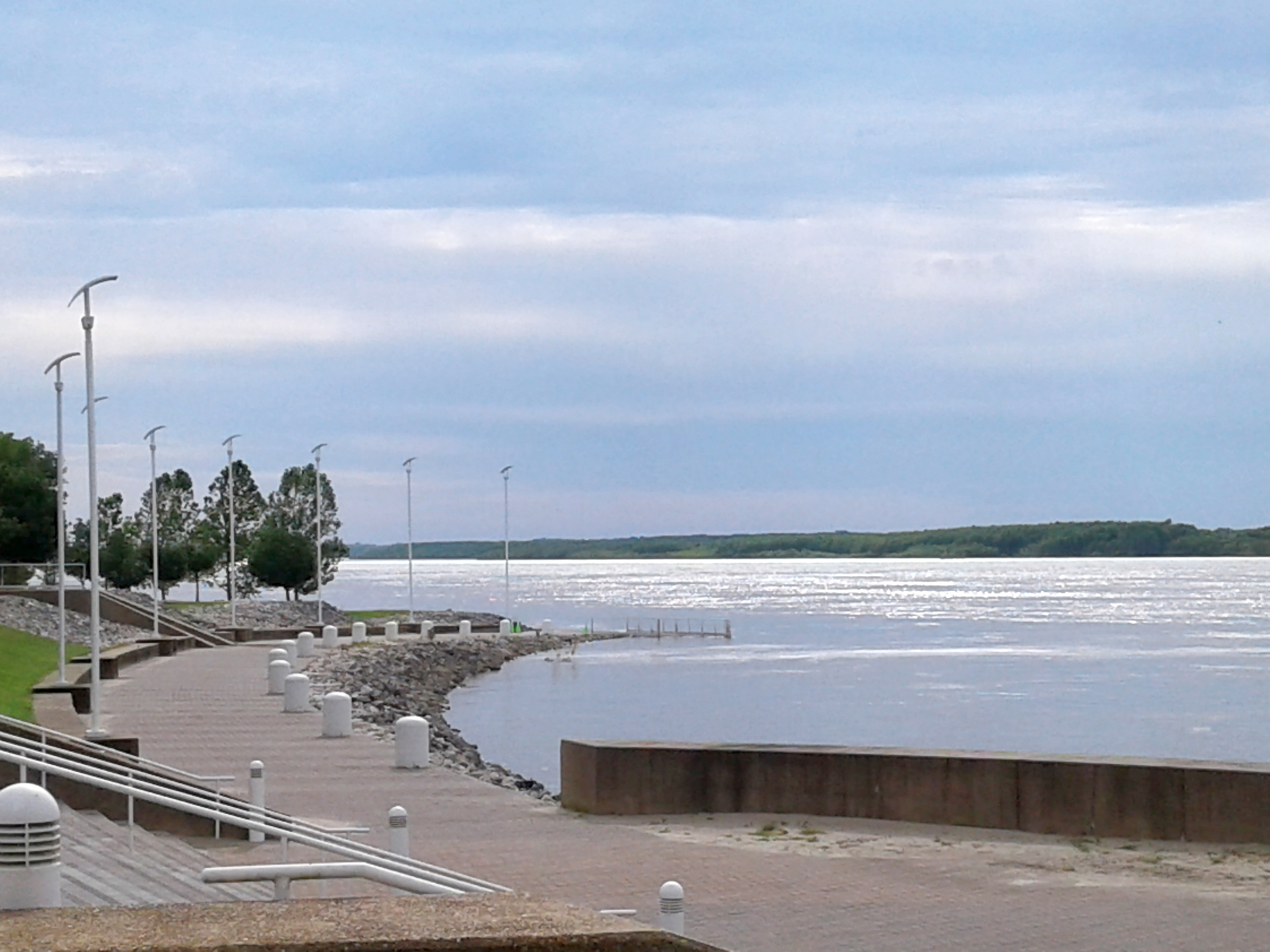
- Tunica County River Park

- Location within the state of Mississippi
- Coordinates: 34°49′48″N 90°18′58″W
- Country: United States
- State: Mississippi
- County: Tunica

Area
  - Total: 29.69 sq mi (76.90 km^{2})
  - Land: 28.69 sq mi (74.30 km^{2})
  - Water: 1.00 sq mi (2.60 km^{2})
- Elevation: 200 ft (61 m)

Population (2020)
  - Total: 2,132
  - Density: 74.3/sq mi (28.69/km^{2})
- Time zone: UTC-6 (Central (CST))
  - Summer (DST): UTC-5 (CDT)
- ZIP code: 38664 (Robinsonville)
- Area code: 662
- FIPS code: 28-74820
- GNIS feature ID: 2586612

Tunica Resorts, formerly known as Robinsonville until 2006, is a census-designated place (CDP) in northern Tunica County, Mississippi, United States, north of the county seat of Tunica. The community is situated mostly between the Mississippi River and U.S. Route 61, along the border with Arkansas. The population as of the 2020 census was 2,132.

Tunica Resorts is the site of six casino resorts, and at one time generated the third largest gambling revenues in the nation, after Las Vegas and Atlantic City, New Jersey, but competition has increased in other locations, including properties owned by Native American tribes and operated on their reservations. The use of the name "Tunica" by the resorts led to the alternative name of Tunica Resorts to make it easier for tourists to find the destination. The unincorporated community of Robinsonville is in the south-central part of the CDP. The Robinsonville post office, with ZIP code 38664, is the mailing address for the entire CDP.

== History ==
In the first half of the 19th century, this area was developed as cotton plantations, part of what was considered the Mississippi Delta extending north to Memphis and south to Vicksburg. It depended on slave labor.

After emancipation, many African Americans continued to work in agriculture in this area. In the early decades of the 20th century, thousands of African Americans migrated north from Mississippi to Chicago and other industrial cities in the Great Migration to leave the violence and oppression of the South, as well as the loss of jobs due to mechanization of agriculture. Population also declined in the county as railroads and highways drew off traffic from the river.

After 1995, gambling casinos and resorts were developed in the unincorporated community of Robinsonville, north of the county seat of Tunica. In a nod to riverboat gambling, to comply with state law, the casinos are built on floating platforms in the Mississippi River.

Lacking the structure of an organized city or town, Tunica Resorts consists mainly of casinos and cotton fields, with few permanent residents living in the community.

Tunica Resorts has ranked as high as the third-largest casino-gambling destination in the United States, as measured by gaming revenue, behind the Las Vegas Strip and Atlantic City, New Jersey. Its casinos attract gamblers mainly from nearby Memphis, but also draw visitors from Mississippi, Tennessee, Arkansas, Alabama, Missouri, Georgia, Illinois and Kentucky. In the second decade of the 21st century, due to increased legalization of gambling in other states, including on Native American reservations, Tunica placed sixth in gaming revenue, after the Las Vegas Strip, Atlantic City, Chicago, Connecticut, and Detroit.

The 2011 Mississippi River floods damaged casino resort buildings and infrastructure in this community. While the casinos float and escaped most damage, the hotels' towers and surrounding businesses are on land. Some of the hotels had major flooding on the lower floors, including the Harrah's Casino Tunica, which was under nearly six feet of water.

== Economy ==
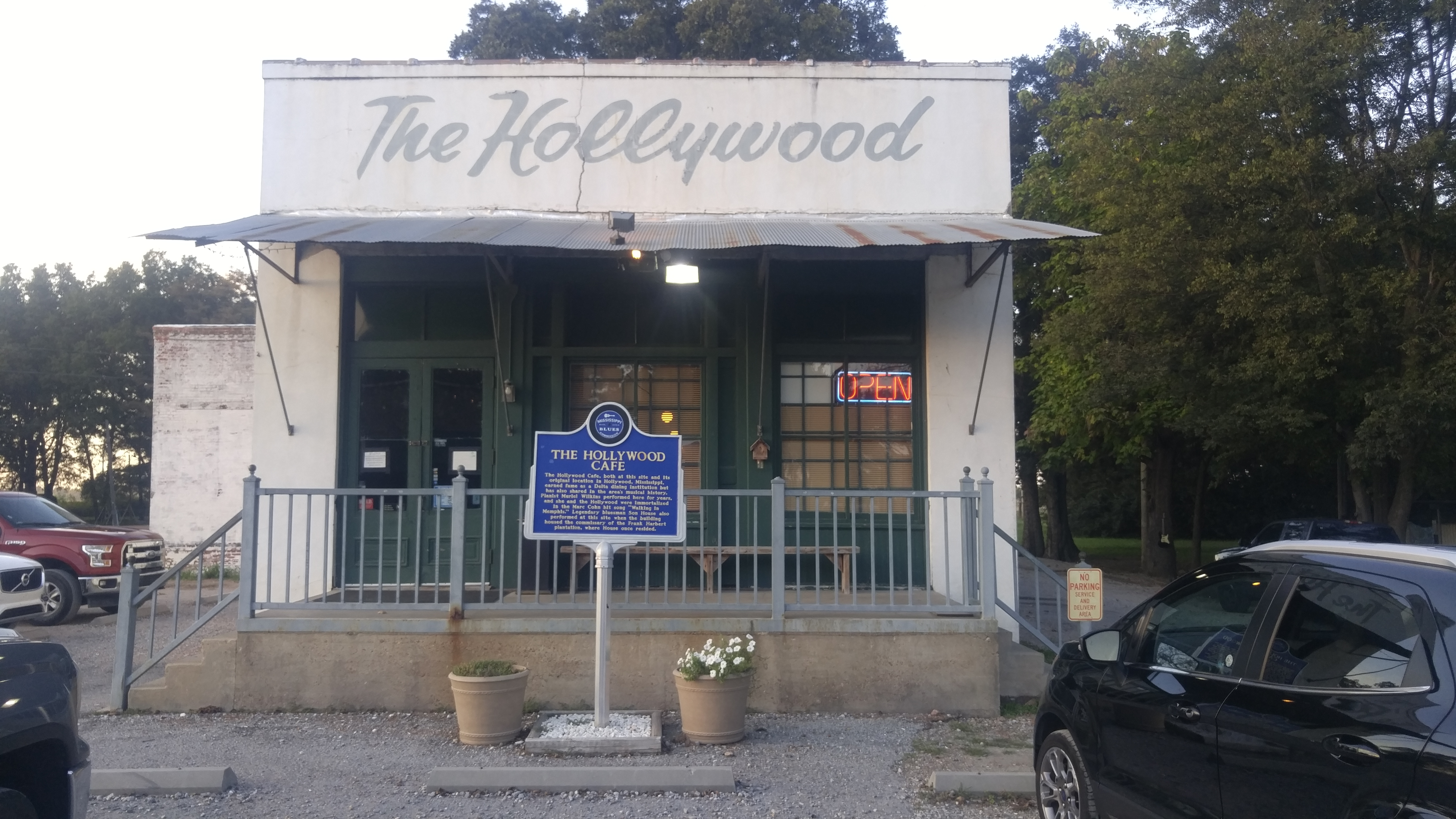
A Mississippi Blues Trail marker at the Hollywood Cafe in Tunica Resorts

As of 2025, the town is home to five casinos:

- 1st Jackpot Casino Tunica
- Fitz Tunica Casino & Hotel
- Gold Strike Tunica
- Hollywood Casino Tunica
- Horseshoe Casino Tunica

At one time, eleven different casinos were operated in the community. Resorts Casino Tunica, Tunica Roadhouse, Treasure Bay Casino, Grand Casino Tunica, Isle of Capri Casino Hotel Tunica (originally the first of three Harrah's locations in the area) and Sam's Town Hotel and Gambling Hall, Tunica all closed.

In the community there is little infrastructure other than that which adjoins the casinos. Businesses other than the casinos include a small number of motels, convenience stores and fast food restaurants, along with an outlet-style shopping center. The community's oldest business is the Hollywood Cafe, a blues club.

Small apartment complexes – many built since 1990 and mainly occupied by casino workers – are among the few dwellings found in Tunica Resorts. Outside of such structures table-flat cotton fields mark much of the area, as was the case before the casinos were built.

== Demographics ==
Historical population
Census	Pop.	Note	%±
2010	1,910		—
2020	2,132		11.6%
U.S. Decennial Census; 2010 2020

Tunica Resorts first appeared as a census designated place in the 2010 U.S. census.

=== Racial and ethnic composition ===
Tunica Resorts CDP, Mississippi – Racial and ethnic composition Note: the US Census treats Hispanic/Latino as an ethnic category. This table excludes Latinos from the racial categories and assigns them to a separate category. Hispanics/Latinos may be of any race.
Race / Ethnicity (NH = Non-Hispanic)	Pop 2010	Pop 2020	% 2010	% 2020
White alone (NH)	634	407	33.19%	19.09%
Black or African American alone (NH)	1,158	1,609	60.63%	75.47%
Native American or Alaska Native alone (NH)	4	2	0.21%	0.09%
Asian alone (NH)	31	14	1.62%	0.66%
Pacific Islander alone (NH)	4	0	0.21%	0.00%
Some Other Race alone (NH)	0	29	0.00%	1.36%
Mixed Race or Multi-Racial (NH)	14	24	0.73%	1.13%
Hispanic or Latino (any race)	65	47	3.40%	2.20%
Total	1,910	2,132	100.00%	100.00%

=== 2020 census ===
As of the 2020 census, Tunica Resorts had a population of 2,132. The median age was 34.0 years. 24.3% of residents were under the age of 18 and 9.4% of residents were 65 years of age or older. For every 100 females there were 93.5 males, and for every 100 females age 18 and over there were 90.0 males age 18 and over.

0.0% of residents lived in urban areas, while 100.0% lived in rural areas.

There were 1,019 households in Tunica Resorts, of which 28.6% had children under the age of 18 living in them. Of all households, 16.3% were married-couple households, 30.3% were households with a male householder and no spouse or partner present, and 41.0% were households with a female householder and no spouse or partner present. About 45.5% of all households were made up of individuals and 8.0% had someone living alone who was 65 years of age or older.

There were 1,209 housing units, of which 15.7% were vacant. The homeowner vacancy rate was 0.7% and the rental vacancy rate was 15.9%.

== Arts and culture ==
In May 2008, the board of directors of the Mid-South Fair announced that the annual event would move to a new site in Robinsonville, on U.S. 61 across from the Tunica Visitors Center. The first fair on the new site was scheduled for 2009. However, mainly because of weather but also because of the poor economy, the fair was instead held at the DeSoto Civic Center, and will continue to be until the new fairgrounds site is ready.

== Government ==
Beginning in 2007, some Robinsonville residents have tried to incorporate their community into a separate town government, rather than exist under the jurisdiction of Tunica County or move toward annexation into the town of Tunica. If Robinsonville incorporates, the new town government would be a direct beneficiary of casino tax revenue, enabling construction of municipal government offices. Depending on population and revenue growth, fire and police stations, a library and other public infrastructure could be other likely additions.

== Education ==
Residents are a part of the Tunica County School District. Zoned schools include Robinsonville Elementary School, Tunica Middle School, and Rosa Fort High School.

== Infrastructure ==
=== Fire department ===
Robinsonville is protected by the North Tunica County Fire Protection District, a career fire department that was created in 1997.

== Notable people ==
Blues musician Robert Johnson spent much of his childhood on a cotton plantation in Robinsonville's Polk Place.

== In popular culture ==
The Hollywood Cafe, a blues club which is Tunica Resorts' oldest business, is prominently mentioned in Marc Cohn's 1991 popular song, "Walking in Memphis".
