= 1st Jackpot Casino Tunica =

Casino and former hotel in Tunica Resorts, Mississippi

Coordinates: 34.845441°N 90.322486°W

- Interactive map of 1st Jackpot Casino Tunica
- Location: Tunica Resorts, Mississippi; 1450 Jackpot Blvd, Robinsonville, MS 38664
- Opened: 1995; 31 years ago
- Gaming space: 46,535 sq ft (4,323.2 m^{2})
- Casino type: Riverboat casino
- Owner: Gaming and Leisure Properties
- Operating license holder: Penn Entertainment
- Previous names: Bally's
- Website: 1stjackpot.com

1st Jackpot Casino Tunica (formerly Bally's) is a casino and former hotel in Tunica Resorts, Mississippi. It is owned by Gaming and Leisure Properties and operated by Penn Entertainment. The casino has 46,535 square feet (4,323.2 m^{2}) of gaming space, with 899 slot machines and 16 table games.

== History ==
Bally's Saloon & Gambling Hall was originally opened on December 6, 1993, at Mhoon Landing by Bally Manufacturing.

In 1994, Lady Luck Gaming opened its Olympia Hotel in Robinsonville, an area 10 miles north of Mhoon Landing which had emerged as a prime casino site because of its closer proximity to Memphis. Lady Luck began construction of a casino to accompany the hotel, but suspended it later that year because of financial difficulties.

In February 1995, Bally and Lady Luck entered into a joint venture agreement, under which Bally would close its casino and move the barge upriver to dock at Lady Luck's hotel. Bally would own 58 percent of the combined venture and manage it, with Lady Luck and a local partner owning the rest. Bally's at Mhoon Landing closed on February 9. The casino reopened at its new location in Robinsonville (now Tunica Resorts) on December 18, 1995.

Hilton Hotels acquired Bally in 1996 and then purchased Lady Luck's share of Bally's Tunica in 1997 for $15 million. Hilton's gaming division, including Bally's, was spun off in 1998 as Park Place Entertainment, later renamed as Caesars Entertainment.

In 2004, Harrah's Entertainment agreed to purchase Caesars. The deal provoked antitrust concerns in some markets, including Tunica, where the combined company would own 5 out of the 9 casinos in the area. To ensure approval of the merger, Harrah's and Caesars agreed to sell four casinos, including Bally's Tunica and Harrah's Mardi Gras, to Colony Capital. The sale was completed in April 2005. The casino continued using the Bally's name under a licensing agreement. The two properties became part of Resorts International Holdings, a newly formed affiliate of Colony Capital.

In 2011, facing a threat of foreclosure, Resorts International Holdings agreed to hand over ownership of Bally's Tunica and Resorts Tunica (formerly Harrah's) to lenders. Foundation Gaming Group, a company based in Gulfport, was retained to manage the two properties.

In January 2014, RIH Acquisitions MS II assumed the management of Bally's Tunica and Resorts Tunica.

In May 2017, Bally's and Resorts Tunica were sold in a joint deal, with Gaming & Leisure Properties acquiring their real estate assets for a total of $83 million, and Penn National Gaming (now Penn Entertainment) purchasing the operating assets for a total of $44 million. The casino was renamed in September 2017 to 1st Jackpot Casino Tunica. The hotel was later demolished.

== See also ==
- List of casinos in Mississippi
