= Hollywood Casino =

Hollywood Casino is a brand owned by Penn National Gaming from its acquisition of Hollywood Casino Corp. It may refer to:

- Hollywood Casino Aurora – Aurora, Illinois
- Hollywood Casino Bangor – Bangor, Maine
- Hollywood Casino Baton Rouge – Baton Rouge, Louisiana
- Hollywood Casino at Charles Town Races – Charles Town, West Virginia
- Hollywood Casino Columbus – Columbus, Ohio
- Hollywood Casino Gulf Coast – Bay St. Louis, Mississippi
- Hollywood Casino at Greektown – Detroit, Michigan
- Hollywood Casino Jamul – San Diego (now Jamul Casino) – Jamul, California
- Hollywood Casino Joliet – Joliet, Illinois
  - Hollywood Casino Amphitheatre (Tinley Park, Illinois)
- Hollywood Casino at Kansas Speedway – Kansas City, Kansas
  - The NASCAR Cup Series at Kansas Speedway, a NASCAR race
- Hollywood Casino Lawrenceburg – Lawrenceburg, Indiana
- Hollywood Casino Morgantown – Morgantown, Pennsylvania
- Hollywood Casino at Penn National Race Course – Grantville, Pennsylvania
- Hollywood Casino Perryville – Perryville, Maryland
- Hollywood Casino St. Louis – Maryland Heights, Missouri
  - Hollywood Casino Amphitheatre (Maryland Heights, Missouri)
- Hollywood Casino Shreveport (now Eldorado Casino) – Shreveport, Louisiana
- Hollywood Casino Toledo – Toledo, Ohio
- Hollywood Casino Tunica – Tunica Resorts, Mississippi
- Hollywood Casino York – York, Pennsylvania
- Hollywood Gaming at Dayton Raceway – Dayton, Ohio
- Hollywood Gaming at Mahoning Valley Race Course – Youngstown, Ohio
