= List of casinos in Ohio =

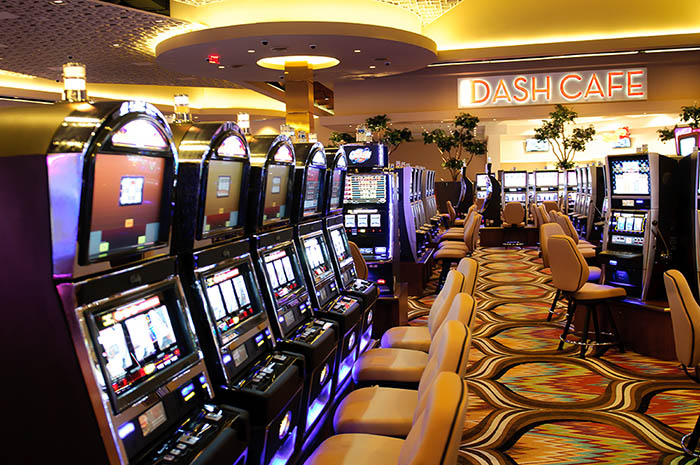

This is a list of casinos in Ohio.

== History ==
Casinos were prohibited in Ohio before 2009, so gamblers instead visited casinos in Indiana, Pennsylvania, West Virginia, and Michigan where they were permitted. In November 2009, Ohio voters approved a measure that would allow for four casinos to be established in the state, one each in Cincinnati, Columbus, Cleveland and Toledo. The casinos were expected to generate $600 million in revenue, with fees collected there to be redistributed to school districts and local governments in the state. It passed by a vote of 53 to 47.

== List of casinos ==
List of casinos in the U.S. state of Ohio
Casino	City	County	State	District	Type	Comments
Belterra Park Cincinnati	Anderson Township	Hamilton	Ohio		Racino	Formerly known as River Downs. Opened May 1, 2014 with 1,600 video lottery terminals. No table games.
Eldorado Gaming Scioto Downs	Columbus	Franklin	Ohio		Racino	Opened June 1, 2012 with 2,100 video lottery terminals. No table games.
Hard Rock Casino Cincinnati	Cincinnati	Hamilton	Ohio		Land-based	Opened March 4, 2013.
Hollywood Casino Columbus	Columbus	Franklin	Ohio		Land-based	Opened October 8, 2012.
Hollywood Casino Toledo	Toledo	Lucas	Ohio		Land-based	Opened May 29, 2012.
Hollywood Gaming at Dayton Raceway	Dayton	Montgomery	Ohio		Racino	Relocation of Raceway Park. Opened August 28, 2014 with 1,000 video lottery terminals. No table games.
Hollywood Gaming at Mahoning Valley Race Course	Austintown	Mahoning	Ohio		Racino	Relocation of Beulah Park. Opened September 17, 2014 with 850 video lottery terminals. No table games.
Jack Cleveland Casino	Cleveland	Cuyahoga	Ohio	Public Square	Land-based	Ohio's first casino opened on May 14, 2012 in the historic former Higbee's Building in Tower City Center on Public Square.
Jack Thistledown Racino	North Randall	Cuyahoga	Ohio		Racino	Opened April 9, 2013 with 1,100 video lottery terminals. No table games.
MGM Northfield Park	Northfield	Summit	Ohio		Racino	Opened December 18, 2013 with 2,300 video lottery terminals. No table games.
Miami Valley Gaming	Turtlecreek Township	Warren	Ohio		Racino	Relocation of Lebanon Raceway. Opened December 12, 2013 with 2,500 video lottery terminals. No table games.

== Gallery ==
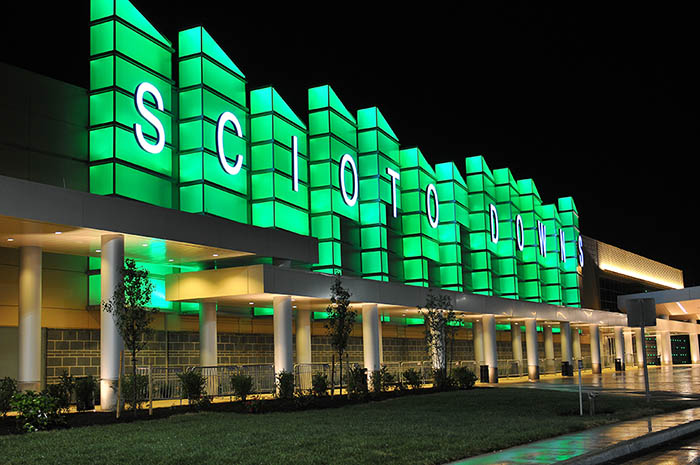

== See also ==
- List of casinos in the United States
- List of casino hotels
