= Perry Ouzts =

American jockey

Personal information
- Born: July 7, 1954 (age 72) Lepanto, Arkansas, U.S.
- Occupation: Jockey

Horse racing career
- Sport: Horse racing
- Career wins: 7,500 ( thru 5/31/2025)

Major racing wins
- selected stakes wins: Cleveland Oaks (1974); Quick Step Handicap (1978); Marfa Stakes (1987); Queen Stakes (1987); Rushaway Stakes (1990); Coney Island Stakes (1996); Magic City Classic Stakes (2002); Ms. Southern Ohio Stakes (2002); Mike Rowland Memorial Handicap (2004); Buckeye Native Stakes (2005); Cradle Stakes (2007); Ohio Freshman Stakes (2009, 2010, 2012); Scarlet and Gray Handicap (2009); Bobbie Bricker Memorial Handicap (2010); Green Carpet Stakes (2010); Vivacious Handicap (2010, 2011, 2012); Forego Stakes (2011); Valedale Stakes (2011); Cincinnatian Stakes (2014, 2016); Hoover Stakes (2014); Joshua Radosevich Memorial Stakes (2015); Loyalty Stakes (2015); A. J. Foyt Stakes (2015); Holiday Inaugural Stakes (2017)

Racing awards
- River Downs Champion Jockey by wins (35 times); Beulah Park Champion Jockey by wins (13 times) Turfway park Champion Jockey by wins (2 times)

Significant horses
- Hy Carol, Old Man Buck, Coax Chad, My Pardner Cal, Indian Ink, Bear Truth, Normandy Crossing, No White Socks

Perry Wayne Ouzts (born July 7, 1954) is an American jockey in Thoroughbred horse racing whose 7,065 wins through March 30, 2020, rank him seventh all-time among jockeys in North America. Through Nov. 9, 2022, Ouzts has ridden 11 horses who earned $100,000 or more in a start. His mounts have earned $52,821,644.

== Riding career ==
Ouzts' career began in 1973 at Beulah Park racetrack in Columbus, Ohio, where his first victory came in March of that year. He would go on to win a record thirty five meet titles at River Downs in Cincinnati, Ohio, two meet titles at Turfway park, and thirteen meet titles at Beulah Park.

Perry Ouzts' career was the subject of the documentary film titled "Ironman Perry Ouzts" that won the 2015 Media Eclipse Award for Television-Feature documentary.

By September 21. 2018 Perry Ouzts became only the ninth jockey in North American racing history to achieve 7,000 career wins.

On July 26, 2025, Ouzts rode his 53,578th race at Belterra Park giving him the all-time mounts record.
