= Camping World RV 400 =

Camping World RV 400 may refer to:

- Camping World RV 400 (Dover), a NASCAR auto race held at Dover International Speedway in 2008.
- Camping World RV 400 presented by Coleman, the 2008 NASCAR race held at Kansas Speedway.
