= Cradle Stakes =

- Location: Belterra Park; Cincinnati, Ohio; United States
- Inaugurated: 1977
- Race type: Thoroughbred - Flat racing

Race information
- Distance: 1 1/16 miles (8.5 furlongs)
- Surface: Turf
- Track: Left-handed
- Qualification: Two-year-olds
- Purse: $125,000

The Cradle Stakes is an American flat Thoroughbred horse race for two-year-olds held at Belterra Park (formerly River Downs) in Cincinnati, Ohio. Open to two-year-olds, it is run over a distance of 1 1/16 miles on the turf.

It was originally created as a dirt race for juveniles in 1977. Miller Genuine Draft sponsored the race from the beginning and, until 2009, it was the longest continuously sponsored Thoroughbred race in the United States. During the 1980s, the Cradle Stakes grew to become the richest race for 2-year-olds in Ohio. One notable winner in that decade was Spend a Buck, who won the 1984 Cradle before going on to win the Kentucky Derby and Horse of the Year honors in 1985.

The Cradle Stakes was moved to the turf in 2007 to serve as a prep for the new Breeders' Cup Juvenile Turf race. River Downs management put the Cradle, and its filly counterpart the Bassinet, on hiatus after 2010 as part of a new contract with horsemen in an effort to maintain daily purses. In July 2022, Belterra management announced that both races would return in September of that year. Both races were cancelled again in August 2022.

== Winners ==
Year	Winner	Jockey	Trainer	Time	Grade
2010	Tanzana	Leandro Goncalves	Garry Simms	1:44.60	
2009‡	Gleam of Hope	Corey Lanerie	Anthony Reinstedler	1:46.80	
2008	Night Action	Victor Lebron	Michael Maker	1:42.40	
2007	Old Man Buck	Perry Ouzts	Kenneth McPeek	1:42.40	
2006	Passport	Corey Lanerie	Frank Brothers	1:46.00	
2005	Laity	Corey Lanerie	Frank Brothers	1:43.60	
2004	Bellamy Road	Abel Castellano Jr.	Michael Dickinson	1:45.00	III
2003	Tiger Hunt	Larry Melancon	W. Elliott Walden	1:49.00	
2002	Lone Star Sky	Mark Guidry	Thomas Amoss	1:46.80	
2001	Harlan's Holiday	Anthony D'Amico	Kenneth McPeek	1:46.40	
2000	Mongoose	Robby Albarado	William Mott	1:46.00	
1999	Deputy Warlock	Fabio Arguello Jr.	Kenneth McPeek	1:47.40	
1998	Mountain Range	Pat Day	D. Wayne Lukas	1:45.80	
1997	Cowboy Dan	Dean Kutz	Danny Hutt	1:47.40	
1996	Haint	Shane Sellers	Frank Brothers	1:46.20	
1995	Devil's Honor	Anthony Black	Cynthia Reese	1:45.00	
1994	Peaks and Valleys	Pat Day	James Day	1:46.60	
1993	Moving Van	Patricia Cooksey	Michael Downing	1:48.60	
1992	Crosswood	James Bruin	Maurice Cobb	1:47.00	III
1991	Wolf Brigade	Sebastian Madrid	James Morgan	1:45.50	III
1990	Wall Street Dancer	Sebastian Madrid	Jesus Suarez		
1989	Table Limit	Herb McCauley	D. Wayne Lukas		
1988	Bravoure	Michael McDowell	John E. Churchman Jr.		
1987	Cannon Dancer	Mike Manganello	Peter W. Salmen Jr.		
1986	Coaxing Chad	Steve Neff	Ronnie G. Warren		
1985	Go For It Matt	Chris Antley	Ronnie G. Warren		
1984	Spend a Buck	Charles Hussey	Cam Gambolati		
1983	Coax Me Chad	Julio Espinoza	William E. Adams		
1982	Spare Card	Glynn Louviere	Richard P. Hazelton		
1981	Ashley's Miss	Eugene J. Sipus Jr.	James B. McKathan Jr.		
1980	Gallant Lt.	Clifton Schwing	Fred Watkins		
1979	Ray's Word	Antonio Costa	Sherman Ingram		
1978	Noon Shadow	J. Harrison	Jacqueline Branham		
1977	Bolero's Orphan	Nick Shuk	James H. Iselin		

- ‡ In 2009, the race was run off the turf.
