= Eldorado Gaming Scioto Downs =

Horse racing track and casino in Columbus, Ohio

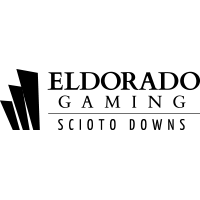

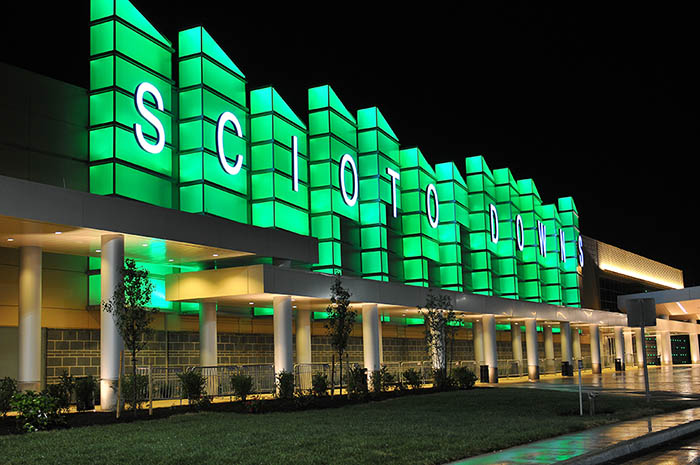
- Interactive map of Eldorado Gaming Scioto Downs
- Location: Columbus, Ohio; 6000 South High Street; 39.8406°N 82.9958°W
- Opened: June 1, 2012
- Gaming space: 117,000 sq ft (10,900 m^{2})
- Casino type: Racino
- Owner: Caesars Entertainment
- Website: www.caesars.com/scioto-downs

Scioto Downs
- Interactive map of Scioto Downs
- Date opened: 1959
- Race type: Standardbred
- Course type: 5/8-mile oval

Eldorado Gaming Scioto Downs, formerly known as Scioto Downs Racino, is a horse racing track and casino in Columbus, Ohio, owned and operated by Caesars Entertainment. The venue opened in 1959, as the Scioto Downs track, and became Ohio's first racino with the addition of video lottery terminals (VLTs) on June 1, 2012. The track was annexed by Columbus from Hamilton Township in 2012. The casino is 117,000 square feet (10,900 m^{2}), with over 2,200 VLTs.

== Information ==
Eldorado Scioto Downs is open 24 hours a day, 365 days a year. In addition to the VLT gaming facility, Scioto Downs includes a year-round horse racing simulcast room and live harness racing from May to September. In May 2013 Scioto Downs started a live outdoor summer music concert series with national acts, primarily in country, rock and blues genres.

== History ==
MTR Gaming Group purchased Scioto Downs in 2003 for $19 million. MTR merged in 2014 with Eldorado Resorts, which then changed its name to Caesars Entertainment in 2020.

Scioto Downs has a long history within the Columbus, Ohio community. In addition to horse racing, Scioto Downs also hosted the annual Ohio High School Athletic Association state cross country running championships, which were generally held in late October or early November, from 1985 to 2010. The meet included Division I, II, and III races for both girls and boys, featuring 950 competitors from 96 teams, and attracted around 10,000 spectators. With the introduction of VLT machines to Scioto Downs (a move shared by other Ohio racetracks) the OHSAA, which is opposed to live gambling, announced that from the 2011 meet the OHSAA championships would move from Scioto to the National Trail Raceway.

In March 2020, Scioto Downs, along with all of Ohio casinos, were shut down due to state mandated COVID-19 restrictions. One year later, Scioto Downs had record breaking revenues in March 2021 after all restrictions were lifted.

== Gallery ==
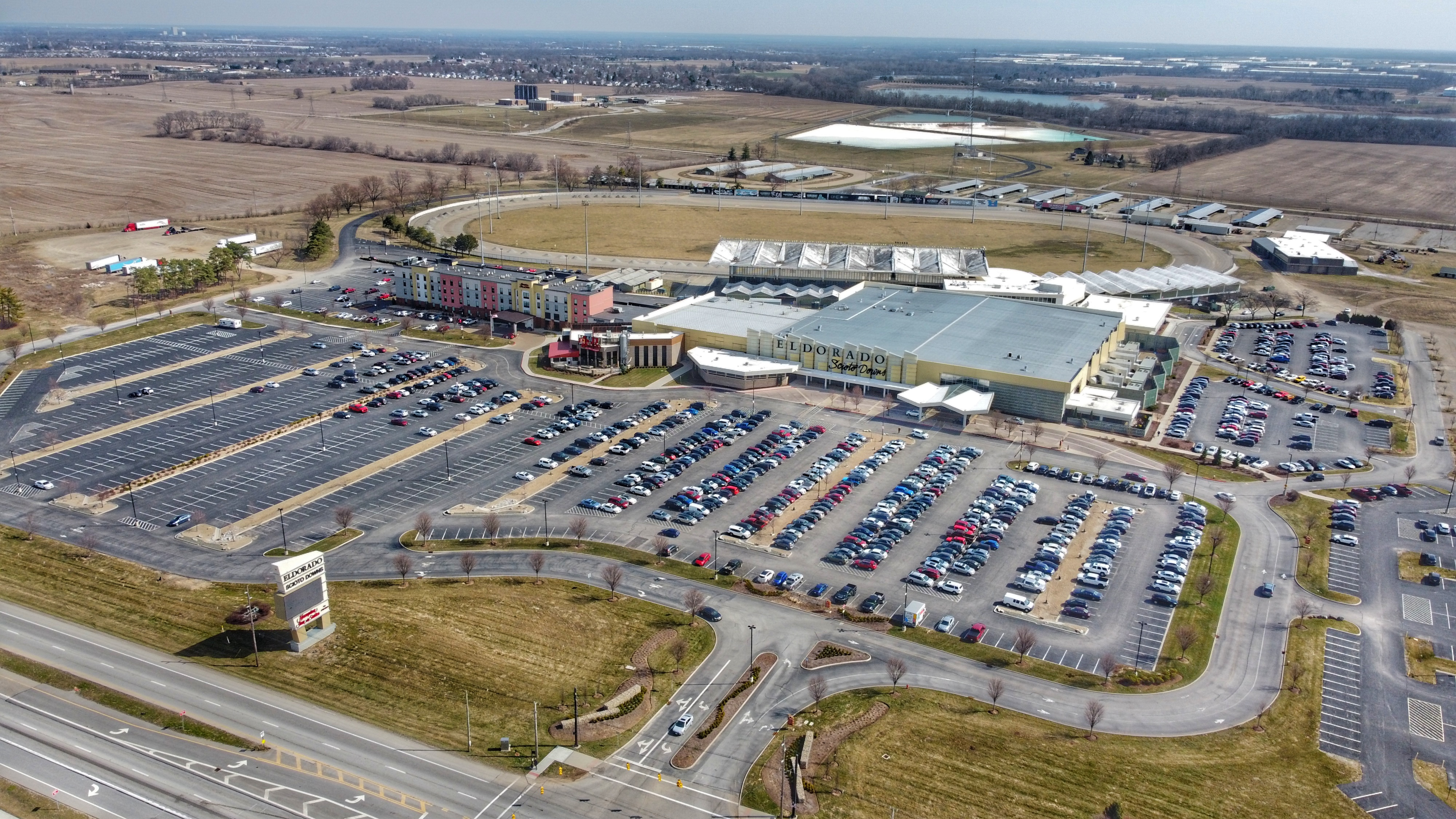
Aerial view

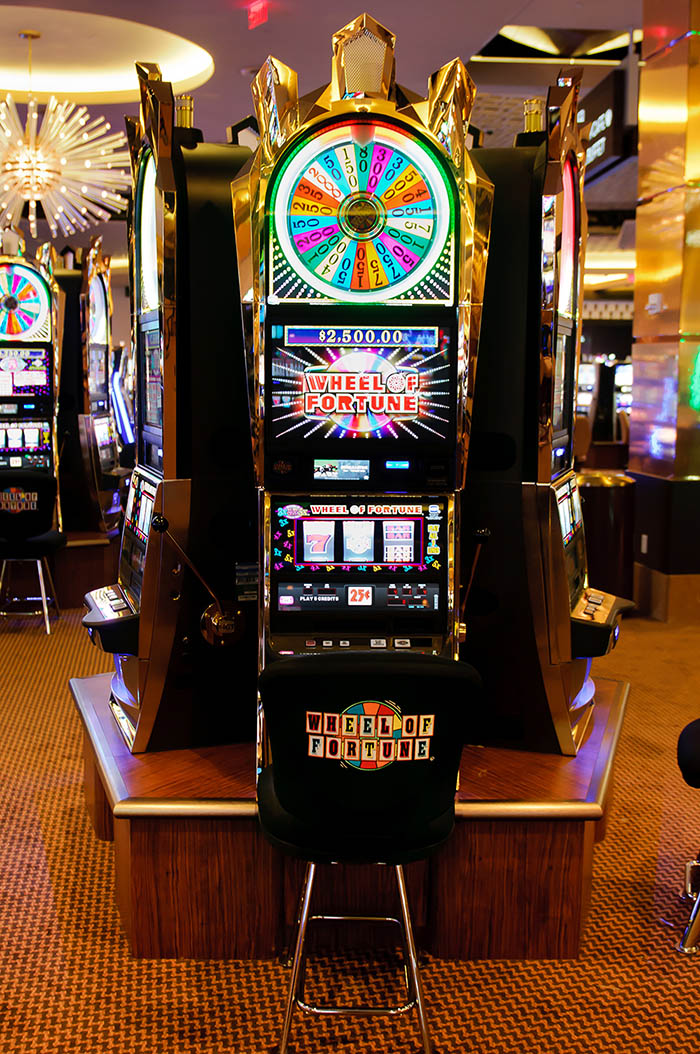
VLT games

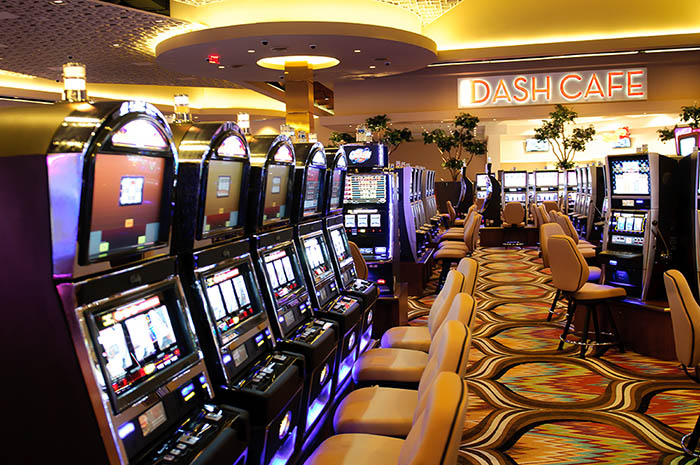
VLT games

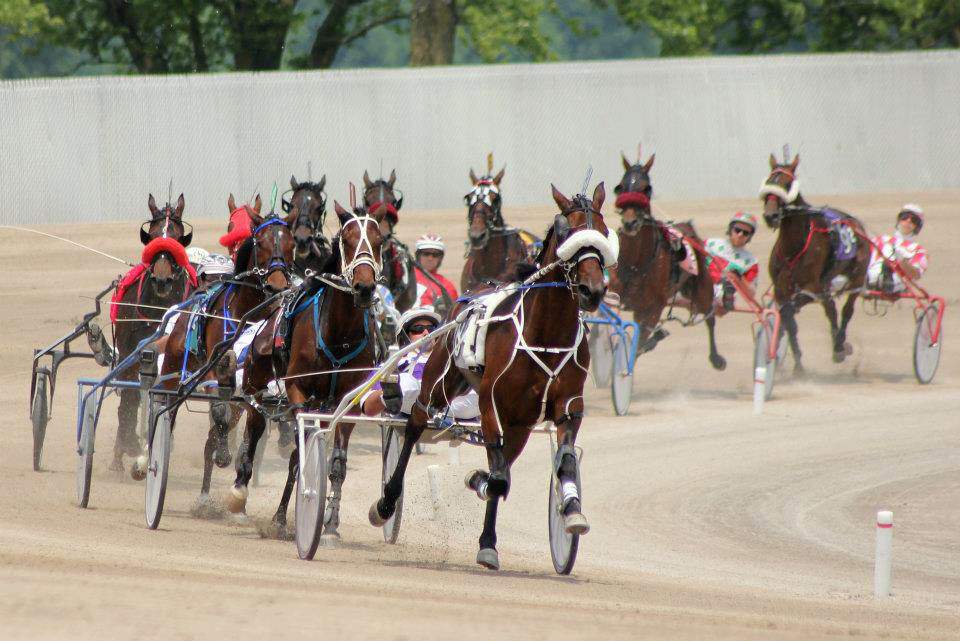
Live race at Scioto Downs

== See also ==
- List of casinos in Ohio
