= Belterra Park Gaming & Entertainment Center =

Racetrack and Casino in Cincinnati, Ohio

Coordinates: 39.050802°N 84.40841°W

- Interactive map of Belterra Park Gaming & Entertainment Center
- Location: Cincinnati, Ohio; 6301 Kellogg Avenue
- Opened: May 1, 2014
- Gaming space: 48,000 sq ft (4,500 m^{2})
- Casino type: Racino
- Owner: Gaming and Leisure Properties
- Operating license holder: Boyd Gaming
- Previous names: River Downs
- Website: belterrapark.com
Belterra Park
- Interactive map of Belterra Park
- Date opened: 1925
- Capacity: 1,200
- Race type: Thoroughbred
- Course type: Flat, Harness Racing
- Notable races: Cane Pace; Cradle Stakes; Bassinet Stakes

Belterra Park, formerly known as River Downs, is a racino located in Anderson Township, Hamilton County, Ohio, just outside the southeast limits of Cincinnati. It is owned by Gaming and Leisure Properties and operated by Boyd Gaming.

== History ==
River Downs opened in Cincinnati, Ohio in 1925 as the Coney Island Race Track. It was opened 15 years after the closing of a previous track in Cincinnati, Old Oakley Race Course. The race track sits right along the banks of the Ohio River, adjacent to the Coney Island water park and Riverbend Music Center.

The famous horse Seabiscuit made two appearances at the track in 1936. His trainer "Silent Tom" Smith shipped the horse in from Detroit with jockey Red Pollard for two consecutive starts. On October 3, 1936, he ran third in the Western Hills Handicap and two weeks later he ran third in the Eastern Hills Handicap.

The track managed to survive the disastrous Cincinnati flood of 1937 and re-opened under the name of "River Downs." Races were and still are held primarily in the summer. The 7-furlong turf course was created in 1956, making River Downs the 13th track in America with a grass racing strip. The infield grass course has drawn rave reviews from horsemen across the country. Hall of Fame jockey Laffit Pincay, Jr. once quoted, "This is the best turf course I've ever ridden on," after he rode Highland Crystal to victory in the Budweiser Breeders' Cup there.

On May 17, 1976, an apprentice jockey won the eighth race at River Downs aboard Red Pipe. It was the race that would launch the career of one of the world's most renowned riders, Steve Cauthen. "The Kid", as he was called, went on to be the leading apprentice and overall rider at River Downs that season. He later rode Affirmed to become the youngest rider to sweep the Triple Crown. He eventually became a champion rider in Europe and may forever be the only jockey ever to win the Irish Derby, French Derby, Italian Derby and England's Epsom Derby in addition to capturing America's "Run for the Roses."

During the 1980s, the Miller Genuine Draft Cradle Stakes grew to become the richest race for 2-year-olds in the state of Ohio. The 1983 winner, Coax Me Chad, went on to a second-place finish behind Swale in the 1984 Kentucky Derby. The 1984 "Cradle" winner did his predecessor one better – he won the 1985 Kentucky Derby. Spend A Buck not only won the Derby, but went on to win ten races and over $4.2 million, eventually being crowned American Horse of the Year.

Over the decades, the wooden grandstand began to strain. River Downs Jockey Club Inc., who purchased the facility in 1975, elected to construct an entirely new grandstand, beginning immediately at the end of the 1988 racing season.

Management kept the style of the traditional open-air grandstand. Wooden benches were replaced with well-spaced stadium seats, a game room was installed next to a new gift shop, and escalators ferry the bettors to an expanded mezzanine level which features numerous concession stands and Finnigans Pub.

In addition to the $16 million grandstand, the paddock was doubled in size, accentuating the River Downs' philosophy that fans like to be close to the horses that they will gamble their money on. Following the 1989 reconstruction of the grandstand, several million dollars were invested in upgrading the Clubhouse. A new air-conditioning unit was installed, over 2500 television monitors were put in place, and the upper Clubhouse was extensively renovated with decor that included cherry wood and Italian marble.

On September 19, 1996, state legislation finally allowed Full Card simulcasting to take place in the state. In a matter of weeks after the live meet ended, the River Downs Clubhouse became the country's most modern simulcasting center – the River Downs RaceBook. Thoroughbred and harness racing from across the nation is broadcast over a 500 set semi-state-of-the-art television system that features over one hundred 40-inch, high-resolution direct-view televisions.

With the advent of increased simulcasting and the Twin Seven Supercard, River Downs installed a 110 channel in-house television system that allows the viewers access to race replays of every race on a single kiosk, advance viewing of upcoming simulcast race conditions and preview shows, and changing odds formats and program changes. River Downs is also the first track to feature a channel showing a "minutes to post" chronological display of all tracks.

Only months after the renovation of the River Downs Racebook, the track fell victim to the Cincinnati flood of 1997. Waters flowed over the banks of the Ohio River in March at a rate that had not been witnessed for over 50 years. The entire lower level of the Clubhouse was flooded, as was the entire first level of the grandstand, office area and barn area. The track lost only 18 days of operation, however, before the upper level of the RaceBook was back in operation. The track was reopened on schedule for live racing in late April. In addition to a completely new lower-level Clubhouse, the backstretch underwent extensive improvements including a newly designed and renovated racing office and kitchen area.

In January 2011, the track was purchased by Pinnacle Entertainment. Under new track management, the two biggest events on the stakes calendar, the Cradle and Bassinet, were canceled in 2011 to save purse money for the horsemen's account. The highlight of the 2011 meet was the $75,000 Queen City Oaks on July 16. The 2011 meet was also reduced to 85 days of racing due to flooding of the Ohio River. The 2013 River Downs meet was moved to Beulah Park as the racing oval and grandstand were torn down to be relocated closer to the barn area. In October 2013, Pinnacle renamed River Downs as Belterra Park.

In October 2018, Boyd Gaming purchased the property from Pinnacle, along with three other casinos. In addition to the price of the operating business, Boyd paid $58 million for Belterra Park's real estate, financed by a loan from Gaming and Leisure Properties (GLP). The sale was required by antitrust regulators as a condition of Pinnacle's acquisition by Penn National Gaming, to preserve competition in the Cincinnati area casino market. In May 2020, ownership of Belterra Park was transferred to GLP in satisfaction of the loan, and it was leased back to Boyd. In December 2020, Belterra was sued in U.S. District Court by the Ohio Horsemen's Benevolent and Protective Association, alleging that the racino neglected to compensate the non profit association millions of dollars in video lottery proceeds that were required by Ohio gaming laws. In February 2021, a motion to dismiss was filed on behalf of Belterra.

== Live racing ==
Up until 2012, racing was typically held at the track from the beginning of April until Labor Day weekend.

For its 2014 reopening Belterra Park applied to race until mid-October, citing an opportunity created when the autumn racing dates at nearby Turfway Park were transferred to Churchill Downs.

In 2017, Belterra Park features live racing beginning on April 29 and ending October 8, with racing held on Fridays, Saturdays, Sundays, most Thursdays, and also Independence Day, Memorial Day and Labor Day. Quarter horse racing will also be featured on September 9 and October 8.

== Physical attributes ==
Prior to the tear-down of the grandstand, Belterra Park's seating capacity was 9,350. The new grandstand has 1,200 permanent stadium-style seats with room to add another 1,000 bleacher-style seats on larger race days.

The racetrack itself was moved slightly to the east as a result of the 2013 rebuild and has two courses, similar to the previous River Downs configuration: the Main Track (dirt) is a 1-mile oval with 6 1/2-furlong and 1 1/4-mile chutes; inside of this is the 7-furlong turf (grass) course. The stable area consists of stalls that can accommodate up to 1,350 horses.

== Races ==
The following are stakes races run at Belterra Park:

Non-graded stakes races:

- Bassinet Stakes
- Buckeye Native Stakes
- Cradle Stakes
- Hoover Stakes
- Miss Southern Ohio Stakes
- Queen City Oaks
- Vivacious Handicap
