= Hollywood Casino Columbus =

Casino in Ohio, United States

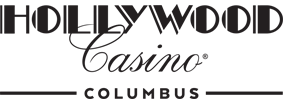

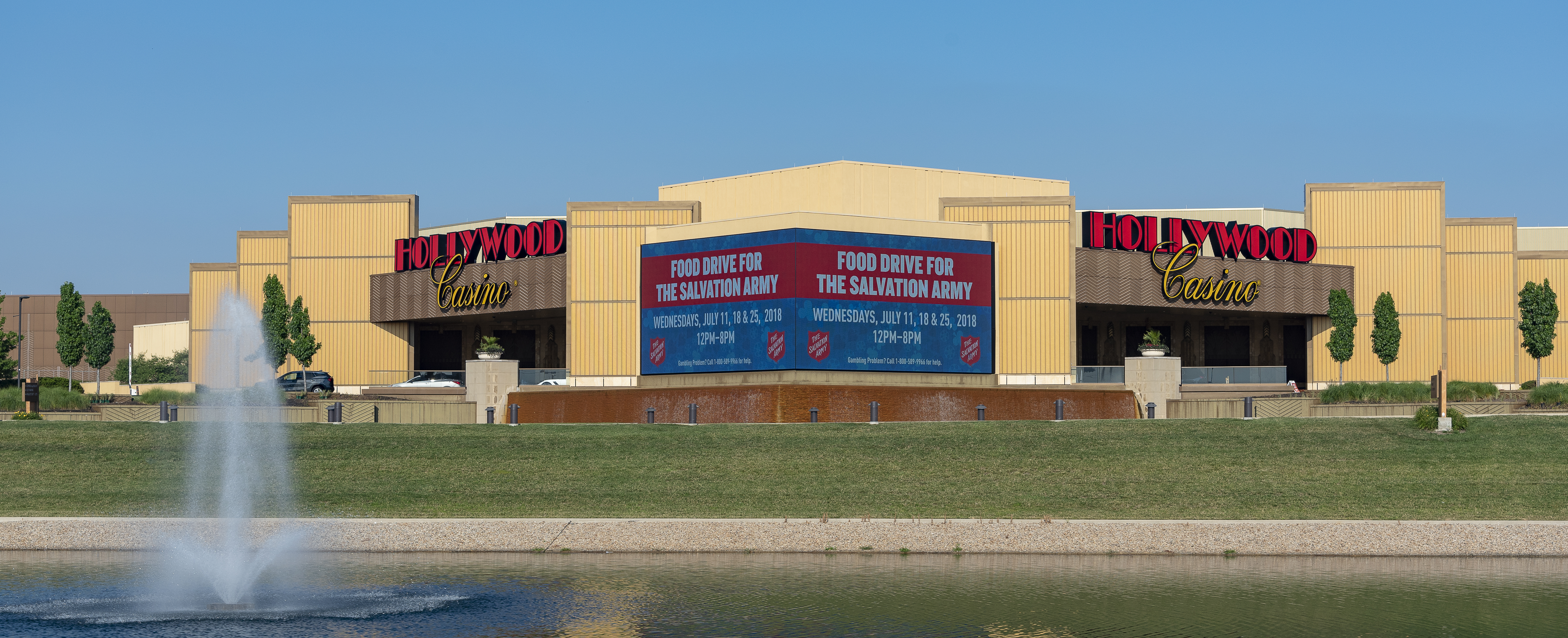
- Interactive map of Hollywood Casino Columbus
- Location: Columbus, Ohio; 200 Georgesville Road; 39°57′2″N 83°6′26″W
- Opened: October 8, 2012
- Gaming space: 160,000 sq ft (15,000 m^{2})
- Casino type: Land-based
- Owner: Gaming and Leisure Properties
- Operating license holder: Penn Entertainment
- Website: hollywoodcolumbus.com

Hollywood Casino Columbus is a casino located in Columbus, Ohio. It opened on October 8, 2012 and is owned by Gaming and Leisure Properties and operated by Penn Entertainment.

== History ==
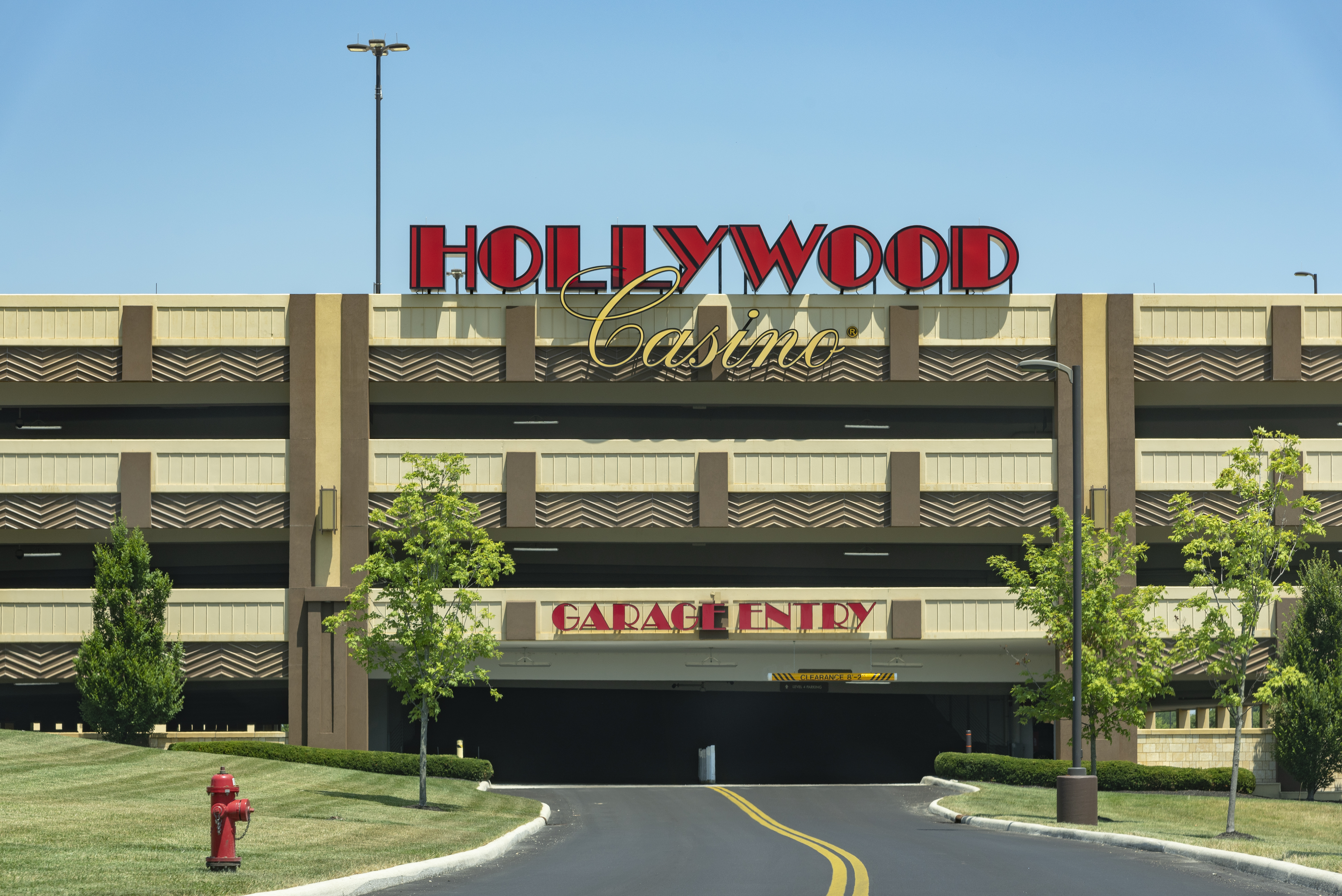
Parking garage

Ohio voters approved a state constitutional amendment in November 2009 authorizing casinos in the state's four largest cities: Cleveland, Cincinnati, Columbus and Toledo. It was the fifth statewide vote to legalize gambling in Ohio over 20 years.

Hollywood Casino Toledo, developed and operated by Penn National Gaming (now Penn Entertainment), opened on May 29, followed by Hollywood Casino Columbus, which opened on October 8, 2012.

Gross casino revenues will be taxed at 33 percent, one of the highest rates in the nation for a resort casino with this level of investment. Portions of the tax revenue are designated for public school districts; the four host cities; all 88 state counties; the Ohio State Racing Commission; law enforcement training; and research and treatment of problem gambling and substance abuse. The bipartisan Ohio Casino Control Commission was created in 2011 to develop rules for casino gaming in Ohio, to license operators and to regulate and ensure the integrity of operations. It is also funded by casino tax revenue.

The casino was built on the site of a former Delphi Automotive auto parts plant that closed in 2007. That plant, in its heyday, employed between 3,900 and 5,000 people.

== See also ==
- List of casinos in Ohio
- Camp Chase Trail
