= 2014 5-hour Energy 400 =

Race details
- Race 11 of 36 in the 2014 NASCAR Sprint Cup Series
- Date: May 10, 2014
- Location: Kansas Speedway, Kansas City, Kansas
- Course: Permanent racing facility
- Course length: 1.5 miles (2.4 km)
- Distance: 267 laps, 400.5 mi (644.5 km)
- Weather: Scattered thunder storms with a temperature around 82 °F (28 °C); wind out of the SSW at 20 mph (32 km/h).
- Average speed: 128.149 mph (206.236 km/h)

Pole position
Driver	Kevin Harvick	Stewart–Haas Racing
- Time: 27.799

Most laps led
Driver	Kevin Harvick	Stewart–Haas Racing
- Laps: 119

Winner
No. 24	Jeff Gordon	Hendrick Motorsports

Television in the United States
- Network: Fox & MRN
- Announcers: Mike Joy, Darrell Waltrip and Larry McReynolds (Television); Joe Moore and Jeff Striegle (Booth); Dave Moody (1 & 2) and Mike Bagley (3 & 4) (Turns) (Radio)
- Nielsen ratings: 3.5/7 (Final); 3.3/6 (Overnight); 5.8 Million viewers

The 2014 5-hour Energy 400 Benefiting Special Operations Warrior Foundation was a NASCAR Sprint Cup Series stock car race that was held on May 10, 2014, at Kansas Speedway in Kansas City, Kansas. Contested over 267 laps on the 1.5 miles (2.4 km) tri-oval, it was the eleventh race of the 2014 NASCAR Sprint Cup Series. Jeff Gordon won the race, his first win of the season and 89th overall, while Kevin Harvick finished second. Kasey Kahne, Joey Logano, and Dale Earnhardt Jr. rounded out the top five. The top rookies of the race were Kyle Larson (12th), Austin Dillon (19th), and Michael Annett (25th).

This was the first time a Sprint Cup race had been held at night at Kansas Speedway. The previous three spring Kansas races had been held as midday races. This was also the Sprint Cup debut of 2023 series champion Ryan Blaney.

== Report ==
=== Entry list ===
The entry list for the 5-hour Energy 400 was released on Monday, May 5, 2014, at 10:23 a.m. Eastern time. Forty-four drivers were entered for the race.

No.	Driver	Team	Manufacturer
1	Jamie McMurray	Chip Ganassi Racing	Chevrolet
2	Brad Keselowski (PC2)	Team Penske	Ford
3	Austin Dillon (R)	Richard Childress Racing	Chevrolet
4	Kevin Harvick	Stewart–Haas Racing	Chevrolet
5	Kasey Kahne	Hendrick Motorsports	Chevrolet
7	Michael Annett (R)	Tommy Baldwin Racing	Chevrolet
9	Marcos Ambrose	Richard Petty Motorsports	Ford
10	Danica Patrick	Stewart–Haas Racing	Chevrolet
11	Denny Hamlin	Joe Gibbs Racing	Toyota
12	Ryan Blaney (i)	Team Penske	Ford
13	Casey Mears	Germain Racing	Chevrolet
14	Tony Stewart (PC3)	Stewart–Haas Racing	Chevrolet
15	Clint Bowyer	Michael Waltrip Racing	Toyota
16	Greg Biffle	Roush Fenway Racing	Ford
17	Ricky Stenhouse Jr.	Roush Fenway Racing	Ford
18	Kyle Busch	Joe Gibbs Racing	Toyota
20	Matt Kenseth (PC5)	Joe Gibbs Racing	Toyota
22	Joey Logano	Team Penske	Ford
23	Alex Bowman (R)	BK Racing	Toyota
24	Jeff Gordon (PC6)	Hendrick Motorsports	Chevrolet
26	Cole Whitt (R)	BK Racing	Toyota
27	Paul Menard	Richard Childress Racing	Chevrolet
31	Ryan Newman	Richard Childress Racing	Chevrolet
32	Travis Kvapil	Go FAS Racing	Ford
33	Timmy Hill	Circle Sport	Chevrolet
34	David Ragan	Front Row Motorsports	Ford
36	Reed Sorenson	Tommy Baldwin Racing	Chevrolet
38	David Gilliland	Front Row Motorsports	Ford
40	Landon Cassill (i)	Circle Sport	Chevrolet
41	Kurt Busch (PC4)	Stewart–Haas Racing	Chevrolet
42	Kyle Larson (R)	Chip Ganassi Racing	Chevrolet
43	Aric Almirola	Richard Petty Motorsports	Ford
44	J. J. Yeley (i)	Xxxtreme Motorsports	Chevrolet
47	A. J. Allmendinger	JTG Daugherty Racing	Chevrolet
48	Jimmie Johnson (PC1)	Hendrick Motorsports	Chevrolet
51	Justin Allgaier (R)	HScott Motorsports	Chevrolet
55	Brian Vickers	Michael Waltrip Racing	Toyota
66	Joe Nemechek (i)	Michael Waltrip Racing	Toyota
77	Dave Blaney	Randy Humphrey Racing	Ford
78	Martin Truex Jr.	Furniture Row Racing	Chevrolet
83	Ryan Truex (R)	BK Racing	Toyota
88	Dale Earnhardt Jr.	Hendrick Motorsports	Chevrolet
98	Josh Wise	Phil Parsons Racing	Chevrolet
99	Carl Edwards	Roush Fenway Racing	Ford
Official entry list

Key	Meaning
(R)	Rookie
(i)	Ineligible for points
(PC#)	Past champions provisional

== Practice ==
=== First practice ===
Kyle Larson was the fastest in the first practice session with a time of 28.560 and a speed of 189.076 mph (304.288 km/h).

Pos	No.	Driver	Team	Manufacturer	Time	Speed
1	42	Kyle Larson (R)	Chip Ganassi Racing	Chevrolet	28.560	189.076
2	43	Aric Almirola	Richard Petty Motorsports	Ford	28.629	188.620
3	15	Clint Bowyer	Michael Waltrip Racing	Toyota	28.643	188.528
Official first practice results

=== Final practice ===
Tony Stewart was the fastest in the final practice session with a time of 28.007 and a speed of 192.809 mph (310.296 km/h).

Pos	No.	Driver	Team	Manufacturer	Time	Speed
1	14	Tony Stewart	Stewart–Haas Racing	Chevrolet	28.007	192.809
2	15	Clint Bowyer	Michael Waltrip Racing	Toyota	28.078	192.321
3	48	Jimmie Johnson	Hendrick Motorsports	Chevrolet	28.090	192.239
Official final practice results

== Qualifying ==
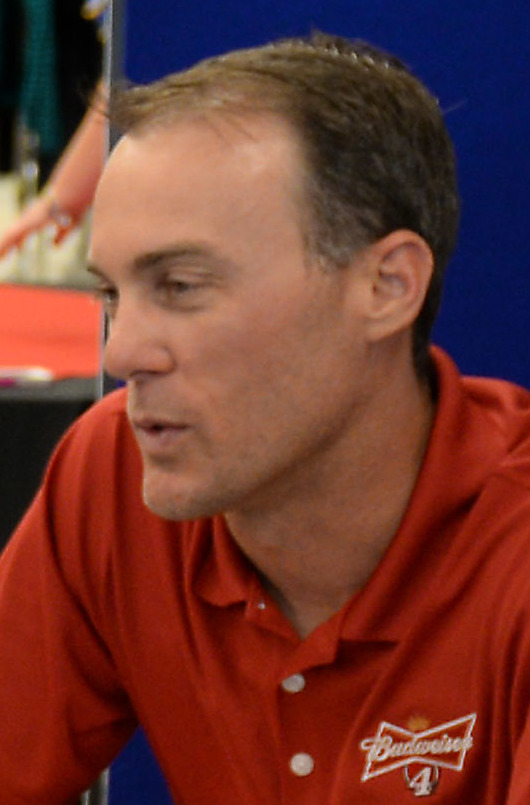
Kevin Harvick won the pole position, setting a new track record.

Kevin Harvick won the pole with a time of 27.799 and a speed of 194.292 mph (312.683 km/h). He also broke the previous track record in round two set last year by Matt Kenseth who started 28th. "Now, we just have to put it all together (Saturday) night when it counts," Harvick said following his record pole run. "It makes life a lot easier when you can have pit stall one. Hopefully, we can have a good night. The weekend has gone well. We had a great test here a few weeks ago and everything has carried right over." "We made the right adjustments and my car was really good through (Turns) one and two in the third round," Joey Logano said of his No. 22 Team Penske Ford. "It's a good starting spot. If you count out the restrictor-plate stuff, we're the only car to make it through every session this season. I'm proud of that and ready to go for another win." "I'm most disappointed in the first run because I thought I had a good lap but obviously didn't push it hard enough," Jeff Gordon said, "...didn't drive it well enough to get us in that first time. And when we had to go back out and put extra laps on the tires and extra heat in the tires, it affected us from that point forward. I'm disappointed that we didn't go faster." Dave Blaney was the only driver who failed to qualify for the race, while his son, Ryan Blaney made his Sprint Cup debut.

=== Qualifying results ===
Pos	No.	Driver	Team	Manufacturer	R1	R2	R3
1	4	Kevin Harvick	Stewart–Haas Racing	Chevrolet	27.983	27.741	27.799
2	22	Joey Logano	Team Penske	Ford	27.996	27.876	27.848
3	2	Brad Keselowski	Team Penske	Ford	28.076	27.929	27.906
4	99	Carl Edwards	Roush Fenway Racing	Ford	27.962	27.897	27.952
5	42	Kyle Larson (R)	Chip Ganassi Racing	Chevrolet	27.947	27.921	27.972
6	41	Kurt Busch	Stewart–Haas Racing	Chevrolet	27.891	27.895	27.973
7	31	Ryan Newman	Richard Childress Racing	Chevrolet	28.091	27.910	28.006
8	14	Tony Stewart	Stewart–Haas Racing	Chevrolet	27.984	27.857	28.045
9	10	Danica Patrick	Stewart–Haas Racing	Chevrolet	28.087	27.944	28.059
10	16	Greg Biffle	Roush Fenway Racing	Ford	27.961	27.928	28.128
11	1	Jamie McMurray	Chip Ganassi Racing	Chevrolet	28.041	27.940	28.157
12	43	Aric Almirola	Richard Petty Motorsports	Ford	28.110	27.887	28.372
13	24	Jeff Gordon	Hendrick Motorsports	Chevrolet	28.095	27.950	—
14	48	Jimmie Johnson	Hendrick Motorsports	Chevrolet	28.022	27.973	—
15	55	Brian Vickers	Michael Waltrip Racing	Toyota	28.092	27.976	—
16	27	Paul Menard	Richard Childress Racing	Chevrolet	28.063	27.995	—
17	5	Kasey Kahne	Hendrick Motorsports	Chevrolet	27.971	28.005	—
18	51	Justin Allgaier (R)	HScott Motorsports	Chevrolet	28.067	28.007	—
19	3	Austin Dillon (R)	Richard Childress Racing	Chevrolet	28.083	28.024	—
20	17	Ricky Stenhouse Jr.	Roush Fenway Racing	Ford	28.012	28.032	—
21	12	Ryan Blaney	Team Penske	Ford	28.004	28.033	—
22	88	Dale Earnhardt Jr.	Hendrick Motorsports	Chevrolet	28.066	28.089	—
23	15	Clint Bowyer	Michael Waltrip Racing	Toyota	28.101	28.153	—
24	18	Kyle Busch	Joe Gibbs Racing	Toyota	28.116	28.463	—
25	9	Marcos Ambrose	Richard Petty Motorsports	Ford	28.128	—	—
26	78	Martin Truex Jr.	Furniture Row Racing	Chevrolet	28.160	—	—
27	13	Casey Mears	Germain Racing	Chevrolet	28.172	—	—
28	20	Matt Kenseth	Joe Gibbs Racing	Toyota	28.197	—	—
29	47	A. J. Allmendinger	JTG Daugherty Racing	Chevrolet	28.258	—	—
30	11	Denny Hamlin	Joe Gibbs Racing	Toyota	28.265	—	—
31	83	Ryan Truex (R)	BK Racing	Toyota	28.322	—	—
32	98	Josh Wise	Phil Parsons Racing	Chevrolet	28.399	—	—
33	23	Alex Bowman (R)	BK Racing	Toyota	28.440	—	—
34	7	Michael Annett (R)	Tommy Baldwin Racing	Chevrolet	28.520	—	—
35	44	J. J. Yeley	Xxxtreme Motorsports	Chevrolet	28.542	—	—
36	26	Cole Whitt (R)	BK Racing	Toyota	28.550	—	—
37	36	Reed Sorenson	Tommy Baldwin Racing	Chevrolet	28.567	—	—
38	34	David Ragan	Front Row Motorsports	Ford	28.580	—	—
39	38	David Gilliland	Front Row Motorsports	Ford	28.649	—	—
40	40	Landon Cassill	Circle Sport	Chevrolet	28.744	—	—
41	32	Travis Kvapil	Go FAS Racing	Ford	28.784	—	—
42	33	Timmy Hill	Circle Sport	Chevrolet	28.848	—	—
43	66	Joe Nemechek	Michael Waltrip Racing	Toyota	28.973	—	—
Did not qualify
44	77	Dave Blaney	Randy Humphrey Racing	Ford	28.656	—	—
Qualifying Results

== Race ==
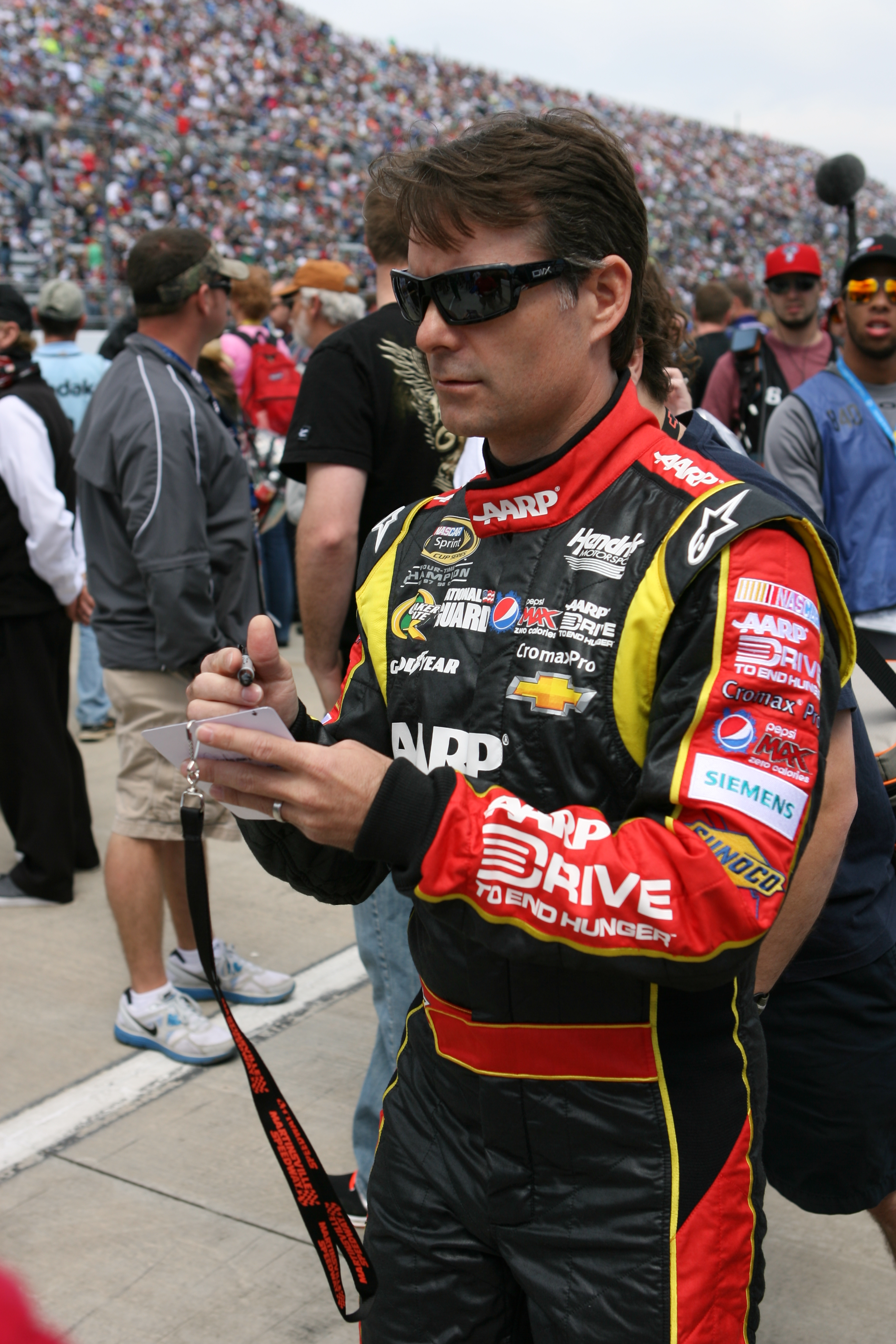
Jeff Gordon won the race.

The race was set to start at 7:46 p.m. Eastern time, but the start of the race was delayed due to the weather. The cars started rolling off a few minutes after 8:00 p.m. but then rain started to pick up again. The race finally went green at 8:23 p.m. with Kevin Harvick leading the way.

Harvick surrendered the lead on lap 42 to make his first stop of the night. Joey Logano assumed the position.

Logano hit pit road the next lap and gave the lead to Carl Edwards.

Edwards ducked onto pit road and handed the lead to Jeff Gordon.

Gordon gave up the lead to pit on lap 45 and Brad Keselowski took the top spot.

The first caution of the race flew on lap 47 when Clint Bowyer got loose exiting turn 2, overcorrected and spun out on the backstretch. Because this took place during a cycle of green flag stops, everyone but Keselowski was trapped a lap down. Kevin Harvick got the lucky dog and restarted second. The rest of the cars took the wave-around and got their lap back.

The race restarted on lap 53 and Harvick shot out back to the lead.

The second caution of the race flew on lap 60 for a vicious four car wreck when David Ragan got loose, slid in front of Ryan Truex, turned to the right into Landon Cassill and destroyed the left-front of his car. Michael Annett suffered damage spinning through the infield grass.

The race restarted on lap 67.

The third caution of the race flew on lap 71 when Denny Hamlin got loose exiting turn 2 and spun out.

The race restarted on lap 75.

Kevin Harvick hit pit road on lap 102 and handed the lead to Carl Edwards.

Edwards ducked onto pit road on lap 103 and surrendered the lead to Joey Logano.

The fourth caution of the race flew on lap 110 when Marcos Ambrose got loose and spun out through the grass exiting turn 4. Dale Earnhardt Jr. exited pit road as the leader by taking just two tires. During the caution period, the Musco backstretch lights outside the track turned off for unknown reasons. The lights inside the track were still working. The drivers told race control that the backstretch was illuminated enough to continue racing.

The race restarted on lap 119.

Joey Logano took back the lead on lap 122.

Kasey Kahne took the lead on lap 139.

The fifth caution of the race flew on lap 150 when Jamie McMurray slammed the wall hard in turn 3 following a cut right-front tire.“I’m not 100 percent sure,” said McMurray when asked what caused the accident. “I just entered turn three and I heard a small pop and then just lost all the steering and got into the fence and then knocked the oil lines and everything off which caused the fire. I’m not sure we didn’t really have any tire issues all weekend. Keith (Rodden, crew chief) had been kind of reporting to me what the tires looked like after each stop and hadn’t seen any really wear issues at all. I don’t know if it was just a bad tire or if I ran over something. Just lost all the air and ended up crashing.” Kasey Kahne traded the lead with Joey Logano on pit road with the former stall being behind the start/finish line, but he exited as the leader. The backstretch lights that went out the previous caution period came back on to full power.

The race restarted on lap 161.

Joey Logano returned to the lead on lap 162.

The sixth caution of the race flew with 88 laps to go when Kurt Busch got loose exiting turn 4 and destroyed his splitter sliding through the grass. Jimmie Johnson opted not to pit and took over the lead.

The race restarted with 83 laps to go and Kyle Busch led a lap before Johnson took back the lead.

The seventh caution of the race flew with 81 laps to go for a multi-car wreck on the front stretch that collected six cars. Exiting turn 4, A. J. Allmendinger got loose, hooked Justin Allgaier who went straight into the path of David Gilliland and both slammed the wall hard before the start/finish line. Allmendinger continued through the grass. Casey Mears also slid through the grass trying to avoid the wrecking cars. “I am okay,” said Gilliland after he left the track's infield care center for examination. “I don’t know what happened. It looked like the 47 (Allmendinger) and 51 (Allgaier) got together and the 51 came back up the track and I hit him and from there a lot of stuff happened. We are alright though. Just a little sore obviously. That is one of the hardest hits I have had in awhile. Hopefully it will be the hardest one for a while to come too. I am find though, just ready to get on with it.” With so much debris on the front stretch and Gilliland's destroyed car needing to be removed, the pace car brought the field down pit road.

The race restarted with 73 laps to go and Joey Logano made his way back to the front.

The eighth caution of the race flew with 65 laps to go when Kurt Busch popped the left-rear tire and spun out exiting turn 2.

The race restarted with 60 laps to go and Kevin Harvick made his way back to the head of the field.

Harvick hit pit road to make his final stop of the race with 30 laps to go and Carl Edwards moved to the lead.

Edwards surrendered the lead to make his last stop with 26 laps to go and Matt Kenseth assumed the lead.

Kenseth ducked onto pit road for the final time with 25 laps to go and Jimmie Johnson assumed the lead.

Johnson dropped onto pit road for the final time with twelve laps to go and Brad Keselowski took over the lead.

Keselowski made his final stop with nine laps to go and the lead cycled back to Jeff Gordon.

Jeff Gordon held off Kevin Harvick in the closing laps to score the victory. “I don’t know what it is about this team, this ’24’ car and us here at Kansas on inaugural days, but I love this place,’’ Gordon said. “What an incredible job ... by this race team. They have been giving me the best racecars all year long. I’m going to be 43 this year, but I feel like I’m 25.’’ “What put us in second is I just didn’t get down pit road very good,’’ Harvick said. “I was paying attention to the fuel pressure gauge instead of the pit lights.’’

=== Race results ===
Pos	No.	Driver	Team	Manufacturer	Laps	Points
1	24	Jeff Gordon	Hendrick Motorsports	Chevrolet	267	47
2	4	Kevin Harvick	Stewart–Haas Racing	Chevrolet	267	44
3	5	Kasey Kahne	Hendrick Motorsports	Chevrolet	267	42
4	22	Joey Logano	Team Penske	Ford	267	41
5	88	Dale Earnhardt Jr.	Hendrick Motorsports	Chevrolet	267	40
6	99	Carl Edwards	Roush Fenway Racing	Ford	267	39
7	10	Danica Patrick	Stewart–Haas Racing	Chevrolet	267	37
8	43	Aric Almirola	Richard Petty Motorsports	Ford	267	36
9	48	Jimmie Johnson	Hendrick Motorsports	Chevrolet	267	36
10	20	Matt Kenseth	Joe Gibbs Racing	Toyota	267	35
11	31	Ryan Newman	Richard Childress Racing	Chevrolet	267	33
12	42	Kyle Larson (R)	Chip Ganassi Racing	Chevrolet	267	32
13	2	Brad Keselowski	Team Penske	Ford	267	32
14	55	Brian Vickers	Michael Waltrip Racing	Toyota	267	30
15	18	Kyle Busch	Joe Gibbs Racing	Toyota	267	30
16	16	Greg Biffle	Roush Fenway Racing	Ford	267	28
17	27	Paul Menard	Richard Childress Racing	Chevrolet	266	27
18	11	Denny Hamlin	Joe Gibbs Racing	Toyota	266	26
19	3	Austin Dillon (R)	Richard Childress Racing	Chevrolet	266	25
20	14	Tony Stewart	Stewart–Haas Racing	Chevrolet	266	24
21	78	Martin Truex Jr.	Furniture Row Racing	Chevrolet	266	23
22	17	Ricky Stenhouse Jr.	Roush Fenway Racing	Ford	265	22
23	15	Clint Bowyer	Michael Waltrip Racing	Toyota	264	21
24	9	Marcos Ambrose	Richard Petty Motorsports	Ford	264	20
25	7	Michael Annett (R)	Tommy Baldwin Racing	Chevrolet	264	19
26	13	Casey Mears	Germain Racing	Chevrolet	264	18
27	12	Ryan Blaney	Team Penske	Ford	263	0
28	26	Cole Whitt (R)	BK Racing	Toyota	263	16
29	41	Kurt Busch	Stewart–Haas Racing	Chevrolet	263	15
30	47	A. J. Allmendinger	JTG Daugherty Racing	Chevrolet	262	14
31	66	Joe Nemechek	Michael Waltrip Racing	Toyota	262	0
32	36	Reed Sorenson	Tommy Baldwin Racing	Chevrolet	261	12
33	98	Josh Wise	Phil Parsons Racing	Chevrolet	261	11
34	32	Travis Kvapil	Go FAS Racing	Ford	258	10
35	23	Alex Bowman (R)	BK Racing	Toyota	257	9
36	51	Justin Allgaier (R)	HScott Motorsports	Chevrolet	186	8
37	38	David Gilliland	Front Row Motorsports	Ford	184	7
38	34	David Ragan	Front Row Motorsports	Ford	171	6
39	1	Jamie McMurray	Chip Ganassi Racing	Chevrolet	149	5
40	33	Timmy Hill	Circle Sport	Chevrolet	137	4
41	44	J. J. Yeley	Xxxtreme Motorsports	Chevrolet	136	0
42	40	Landon Cassill	Circle Sport	Chevrolet	63	0
43	83	Ryan Truex (R)	BK Racing	Toyota	57	1
Race Results

=== Race statistics ===
- Lead changes: 25 among different drivers
- Cautions/Laps: 8 for 47
- Red flags: 0
- Time of race: 3 hours, 7 minutes and 31 seconds
- Average speed: 128.149 miles per hour (206.236 km/h)

== Media ==
=== Television ===
Fox Sports
Booth announcers	Pit reporters
Lap-by-lap: Mike Joy; Color-commentator: Larry McReynolds; Color commentator: Darrell Waltrip	Matt Yocum; Steve Byrnes; Krista Voda; Jeff Hammond

=== Radio ===
MRN Radio
Booth announcers	Turn announcers	Pit reporters
Lead announcer: Joe Moore; Announcer: Jeff Striegle	Turns 1 & 2: Dave Moody; Turns 3 & 4: Mike Bagley	Winston Kelly; Steve Post; Alex Hayden; Pete Pistone

== Standings after the race ==
Drivers' Championship standings

	Pos	Driver	Points
	1	Jeff Gordon	394
	2	Matt Kenseth	379 (−15)
	3	Kyle Busch	373 (−21)
	4	Dale Earnhardt Jr.	368 (−26)
	5	Carl Edwards	367 (−27)
	6	Joey Logano	346 (−48)
	7	Jimmie Johnson	340 (−54)
1	8	Ryan Newman	332 (−62)
1	9	Greg Biffle	328 (−66)
	10	Brian Vickers	327 (−67)
	11	Brad Keselowski	326 (−68)
	12	Denny Hamlin	318 (−76)
	13	Kyle Larson (R)	318 (−76)
	14	Austin Dillon (R)	306 (−88)
4	15	Kevin Harvick	302 (−92)
4	16	Kasey Kahne	294 (−100)

Manufacturers' Championship standings

Pos	Manufacturer	Points
1	Chevrolet	489
2	Ford	474 (−15)
3	Toyota	444 (−30)

- Note: Only the first sixteen positions are included for the driver standings.

Previous race: 2014 Aaron's 499	Sprint Cup Series; 2014 season	Next race: 2014 NASCAR Sprint All-Star Race
