= Buckaroo (horse) =

American Thoroughbred racehorse

- Sire: Buckpasser
- Grandsire: Tom Fool
- Dam: Stepping High
- Damsire: No Robbery
- Sex: Stallion
- Foaled: February 13, 1975
- Country: United States
- Colour: Bay
- Breeder: Greentree Stud
- Owner: Greentree Stable
- Trainer: John Gaver
- Record: 18: 5-5-1
- Earnings: $138,604

Major wins
- Peter Pan Stakes (1978); Saranac Stakes (1978)

Awards
- Leading sire in North America (1985)

Buckaroo (February 13, 1975 – July 30, 1996) was an American Thoroughbred racehorse, best known as the sire of Horse of the Year Spend a Buck. Buckaroo was the Leading sire in North America of 1985.

== Background ==
Buckaroo was bred in Kentucky by Greentree Stud and raced for Greentree Stable as a homebred. He was sired by Buckpasser, a Hall of Fame racehorse whose immense influence on the breed came mainly as a broodmare sire. Buckaroo's dam, Stepping High, was a stakes-placed daughter of No Robbery.

== Racing career ==
Buckaroo made three starts at age two, earning one win in a maiden special weight race at Belmont Park. He made ten starts at age three, recording four wins including the Grade II Saranac Stakes and Grade III Peter Pan Stakes. He was also second in the Dwyer and Whitney Handicaps. At age four, he finished out of the money in five starts.

== Stud record ==
In 1980, Buckaroo was retired to stud at Greentree Stud in Kentucky. For the 1985 breeding season, he was relocated to Happy Valley in Florida. He was subsequently moved to the Florida Stallion Station for the 1991 season, and finished his breeding career at Bridlewood Farm.

Buckaroo sired 539 named foals, of which 350 (64.9%) were winners and 29 (5.4%) were stakes winners. Spend a Buck, winner of the Kentucky Derby winner, was his most successful offspring, and helped him become the leading sire in North America of 1985. His most successful sons at stud were Spend a Buck and Montbrook. In 2004, he was designated as a brilliant/intermediate chef-de-race.

He died in July 1996 due to kidney failure.

== Pedigree ==
Pedigree of Buckaroo, bay stallion foaled February 13, 1975
Sire Buckpasser bay 1963	Tom Fool b. 1949	Menow	Pharamond (GB)
Sire Buckpasser bay 1963	Tom Fool b. 1949	Menow	Alcibiades
Sire Buckpasser bay 1963	Tom Fool b. 1949	Gaga	Bull Dog (FR)
Sire Buckpasser bay 1963	Tom Fool b. 1949	Gaga	Alpoise
Sire Buckpasser bay 1963	Busanda blk. 1947	War Admiral	Man o' War
Sire Buckpasser bay 1963	Busanda blk. 1947	War Admiral	Brushup
Sire Buckpasser bay 1963	Busanda blk. 1947	Businesslike	Blue Larkspur
Sire Buckpasser bay 1963	Busanda blk. 1947	Businesslike	La Troienne (FR)
Dam Stepping High bay 1969	No Robbery d. 1960	Swaps	Khaled
Dam Stepping High bay 1969	No Robbery d. 1960	Swaps	Iron Reward
Dam Stepping High bay 1969	No Robbery d. 1960	Bimlette	Bimelech
Dam Stepping High bay 1969	No Robbery d. 1960	Bimlette	Bloodroot
Dam Stepping High bay 1969	Bepop II (FR) b. 1957	Prince Bio (FR)	Prince Rose (GB)
Dam Stepping High bay 1969	Bepop II (FR) b. 1957	Prince Bio (FR)	Biologie
Dam Stepping High bay 1969	Bepop II (FR) b. 1957	Capellina (FR)	Le Capucin
Dam Stepping High bay 1969	Bepop II (FR) b. 1957	Capellina (FR)	Bellina (FR) (Family 11-g*)

- Buckaroo is shown as descending from family 11-g. However, the mitochondrial DNA of female descendants of his granddam Bebop is inconsistent with that of other members of this family. This indicates there was an error in the pedigree at some point before Bebop.
