= Jameela Stakes =

- Class: Restricted State-bred Stakes
- Location: Laurel Park Racecourse, Laurel, Maryland, United States
- Inaugurated: 1983
- Race type: Thoroughbred – Flat racing
- Website: www.laurelpark.com

Race information
- Distance: 6 furlongs
- Surface: Turf
- Track: Left-handed
- Qualification: Three-year-olds & Up fillies and mare
- Weight: Assigned
- Purse: $75,000

The Jameela Stakes is an American Thoroughbred horse race held annually in August at Laurel Park Racecourse in Laurel, Maryland. It is open to fillies and mare three years old and up and is raced on turf. For 2016, the distance is 6 furlongs.

The race was named in honor of Jameela, whose name is Arabic for "beautiful." Jameela was the first Maryland-bred horse to go over the $1,000,000.00 in earnings. Jameela was the daughter of Rambuntious and Asbury Mary and was foaled in 1976. She was retired after four seasons with career earnings of $1,038,704. She finished fourth or better in 52 of her 58 starts. She was raced during part of her career by her breeder, Betty Worthington of Bel Air, Maryland. Jameela was sold to Peter Brant in 1981 for $804,0000. The two-time Maryland-bred Horse of the Year (1981 and 1982) won 16 stakes races, including Grade 1 victories in the Maskette Stakes, the Ladies Handicap and the Delaware Handicap.

Jameela was retired after the 1982 season. She produced two foals for Brant, both by Mr. Prospector before she died of colic in 1985. Her very first foal, Gulch, earned over $3 million, won the Breeders' Cup Sprint (Grade 1) and was named the Eclipse-Award-winning sprinter of the year. Gulch went on to become one of the nation's most respected sires. His sons included champion 3 year-old Thunder Gulch and Preakness Stakes winner and Horse of the Year winner Point Given.

The Jameela Stakes was run on the main track between 1983–2004 and in 2011. The race was run exclusively for 3 year-old fillies from 1986 to 2004. The Jameela Stakes was run at Pimlico Race Course from 1983 to 1985 and in 2001.

== Records ==
Speed record:

- 6 furlongs – 1:07.20 – Jazzy Idea (2012)
- 7 furlongs – 1:24.40 – Silmaril (2004) & Boxer Girl (2003)
- 1 1/16 mile – 1:44.00 – Sham Say (1988)

Most wins by a horse

- 2 – Madame Giry (2013 & 2014)

Most wins by a jockey:

- 3 – Rick Wilson (1994, 1995 & 2001)
- 3 – Mario Pino (1987, 1997 & 2002)

Most wins by a trainer:

- 2 – Cam Gambolati (2013 & 2014)
- 2 – Carlos A. Garcia (1994 & 1995)

== Winners of the Jameela Stakes since 1983 ==
Year	Winner	Age	Jockey	Trainer	Owner	Distance	Time	Purse
2021	Ellation	5	Victor Carrasco	Michael J. Trombetta	Dark Hollow Farm	5 fur.	58.59	$75,000
2019–20	No Races	-	No Races	No Races	No Races	no races	0:00.00	no races
2018	Rocky Policy	6	Daniel Centeno	Dale Capuano	Richard Vermillion	6 fur.	1:08.78	$75,000
2017	Daylight Ahead	4	Katie Davis	Hugh McMahon	Winners Circle Partn.	6 fur.	1:09.13	$75,000
2016	Loveable Lady	5	Horacio Karamanos	Mary Eppler	Samuel Rogers Trust	6 fur.	1:11.14	$75,000
2015	Monster Sleeping	6	Forest Boyce	Dale Capuano	Charles Reed	6 fur.	1:09.52	$60,000
2014	Madame Giry	5	Eddie Castro	Cam Gambolati	Nutmeg Stable	6 fur.	1:08.20	$100,000
2013	Madame Giry	4	Cornelio Velásquez	Cam Gambolati	Nutmeg Stable	6 fur.	1:08.20	$75,000
2012	Jazzy Idea	3	Luis Garcia	Edwin Merryman	Edwin W. Merryman	6 fur.	1:07.20	$100,000
2011	Comet of Love	4	Ricardo Chiappe	Thomas Iannotti	Elkstone Group	6 fur.	1:10.40	$60,000
2010	Fascinatin' Rhythm	5	Rosemary Homeister	Richard W. Small	Buckingham Farm	6 fur.	1:11.00	$60,000
2005–09	No Races	-	No Races	No Races	No Races	no races	0:00.00	no races
2004	Silmaril	3	Able Castellano	Christopher Grove	Stephen E. Quick	7 fur.	1:24.40	$75,000
2003	Boxer Girl	3	Rick Wilson	Michael Zwiesler	Bayard Sharp	7 fur.	1:24.40	$60,000
2002	Bronze Abe	3	Mario Pino	Grover Delp	Samuel F. Bayard	7 fur.	1:27.00	$60,000
2001	Gigi's Magic	3	Rick Wilson	Kelly Breen	Henry T. Rathbun	6 fur.	1:10.10	$60,000
2000	Case of the Blues	3	Mark T. Johnston	Hamilton Smith	Skeedattle, II	6 fur.	1:11.00	$60,000
1999	Potomac Bend	3	Mark T. Johnston	Vincent Blengs	Mark Hayden	6 fur.	1:11.30	$60,000
1998	Cosmo Topper	3	Greg Hutton	John J. Robb	Tulip Hill Farm	6 fur.	1:13.040	$60,000
1997	Weather Vane	3	Mario Pino	Richard W. Delp	Par Four Racing Stab	6 fur.	1:10.40	$60,000
1996	Secret Prospect	3	Carlos H. Marquez Jr.	John J. Tammaro	Conover Stable	6 fur.	1:11.40	$60,000
1995	White Cliffs	3	Rick Wilson	Carlos A. Garcia	Ralph S. O'Connor	6 fur.	1:11.00	$60,000
1994	Prospective Joy	3	Rick Wilson	Carlos A. Garcia	Fourbros Stable	6 fur.	1:11.10	$50,000
1993	Cormorant's Flight	3	Mike Luzzi	Ronald Cartwright	Double Seuz Partners	6 fur.	1:10.20	$50,000
1992	Land Running	3	Clarence J. Ladner III	Berkley Kern	Walter F. Murray	1 1/16 m.	1:46.30	$60,000
1991	Wide Country	3	Santos Chavez	Robert W. Camac	Thomas Tanner	1 1/16 m.	1:45.40	$75,000
1990	Run Smartly	3	Mario Pino	n/a	Ryehill Farm	1 1/16 m.	1:44.30	$75,000
1989	Misty Ivor	3	Clarence J. Ladner III	W. Meredith Bailes	William R. Harris	1 1/16 m.	1:45.40	$75,000
1988	Sham Say	3	B. Feliciano	William B. Cox	Eugene Ford Sr.	1 1/16 m.	1:44.00	$55,000
1987	Angelina County	3	Mario Pino	n/a	Carey K. Miller	1 mile	1:39.30	$60,000
1986	Ann's Bid	3	Alberto Delgado	Henry L. Carroll	Joseph O. Morrisey	7 fur.	1:25.30	$40,000
1985	Alden's Ambition	4	Jesse Davidson	John J. Robb	Hal C. Clagett	6 fur.	1:09.10	$30,000
1984	Dancing Dot	4	John K. Adams	John M. Bosley	Elisabeth J. Todd	6 fur.	1:10.120	$30,000
1983	Sweet Chrissy	5	Alberto Delgado	Richard M. Weiss	A. E. Verdi	6 fur.	1:11.20	$30,000
