= 1985 Kentucky Derby =

Horse race

111th Kentucky Derby
- Kentucky Derby
- Location: Churchill Downs
- Date: May 4, 1985
- Winning horse: Spend a Buck
- Jockey: Ángel Cordero Jr.
- Trainer: Cam Gambolati
- Owner: Hunter Farm
- Conditions: Fast
- Surface: Dirt
- Attendance: 108,573

The 1985 Kentucky Derby was the 111th running of the Kentucky Derby. The race took place on May 4, 1985, with 108,573 people in attendance.

== Full results ==
Finished	Post	Horse	Jockey	Trainer	Owner	Time / behind
1st	9	Spend a Buck	Ángel Cordero Jr.	Cam Gambolati	Hunter Farm	2:00.20
2nd	5	Stephan's Odyssey	Laffit Pincay Jr.	Woody Stephens	Henryk de Kwiatkowski	
3rd	3	Chief's Crown	Don MacBeth	Roger Laurin	Star Crown Stable	
4th	12	Fast Account	Chris McCarron	Patricia L. Johnson	William R. Hawn	
5th	10	Proud Truth	Jorge Velásquez	John M. Veitch	Darby Dan Farm	
6th	11	Skywalker	Eddie Delahoussaye	Michael C. Whittingham	Oak Cliff Stable	
7th	4	Tank's Prospect	Gary Stevens	D. Wayne Lukas	Mr. & Mrs. E. Klein	
8th	8	Floating Reserve	Sandy Hawley	Joseph A. Manzi	Robert E. Hibbert	
9th	1	Rhoman Rule	Jacinto Vásquez	Angel A. Penna Jr.	Brownell Combs II	
10th	6	Encolure	Ronald Ardoin	Tommie T. Morgan	Fred Porter Estate	
11th	2	Irish Fighter	Pat Day	Billy S. Borders	Izzie Proler	
12th	1a	Eternal Prince	Richard Migliore	John J. Lenzini Jr.	Hurst, Steinbrenner, Post & Spendthrift Farm	
13th	7	I Am the Game	Darrel McHargue	King T. Leatherbury	Leatherbury & Mandjuris	

== Payout ==
Post	Horse	Win	Place	Show
9	Spend a Buck	US$10.20	5.40	3.40
5	Stephan's Odyssey		10.20	5.00
3	Chief's Crown			2.80
