= Cam Gambolati =

American racehorse trainer

Cam M. Gambolati
Personal information
- Born: September 29, 1949 (age 77) Manchester, Connecticut, U.S.
- Occupation: Trainer

Horse racing career
- Sport: Horse racing
- Career wins: 392+ (ongoing)

Major racing wins
- Arlington-Washington Futurity Stakes (1984); Cradle Stakes (1984); Gallorette Stakes (1984); Young America Stakes (1984); Florida Oaks (1985); Jersey Derby (1985); Monmouth Handicap (1985); Princess Rooney Stakes (1997); Smile Sprint Stakes (1997); Regret Stakes (2006); Storm Cat Stakes (2006); Just Smashing Stakes (2007); Spectacular Bid Stakes (2007); Appleton Stakes (2008); Red Bank Stakes (2008); Rutgers University Stakes (2010); Hal's Hope Stakes (2011); Majestic Light Stakes (2011); Franklin County Stakes (2012); Jameela Stakes (2013, 2014); Smart N Fancy Stakes (2013) U.S. Triple Crown wins: Kentucky Derby (1985)

Significant horses
- Buffalo Man, Madame Giry, Soaring Empire, Spend a Buck

Cam M. Gambolati (born September 29, 1949, in Manchester, Connecticut) is an American Thoroughbred racehorse trainer best known for winning the 1985 Kentucky Derby with Spend A Buck.

Gambolati worked as a Laundromat operator and as a statistician for the Tampa Bay Buccaneers of the National Football League. He has had a long association with racehorse owner and University of Louisville basketball coach Rick Pitino who heads a racing partnership competing as the Ol Memorial Stable.
