= Beulah Park racetrack =

Ohio's first thoroughbred racetrack and premier event center

Coordinates: 39°53′20.69″N 83°5′53.32″W

Beulah Park
- Location: Grove City, Ohio; United States
- Owned by: Penn National Gaming
- Date opened: 1923
- Course type: Flat/Thoroughbred
- Notable races: Scarlet & Gray Handicap; Glacial Princess Stakes.

Beulah Park was Ohio's first thoroughbred racetrack and premier event center, offering live thoroughbred racing from October through to early May. The track also offered Quarter Horse racing on select days throughout the season, with the most notable races occurring in mid-October with three AQHA graded stakes. Located seven miles outside Columbus, Beulah Park was open seven days a week for simulcast wagering. It was also known for the Beulah Park Twins (Katie and Jenna), who were the simulcast hosts from 1997 to 2009.

== History ==
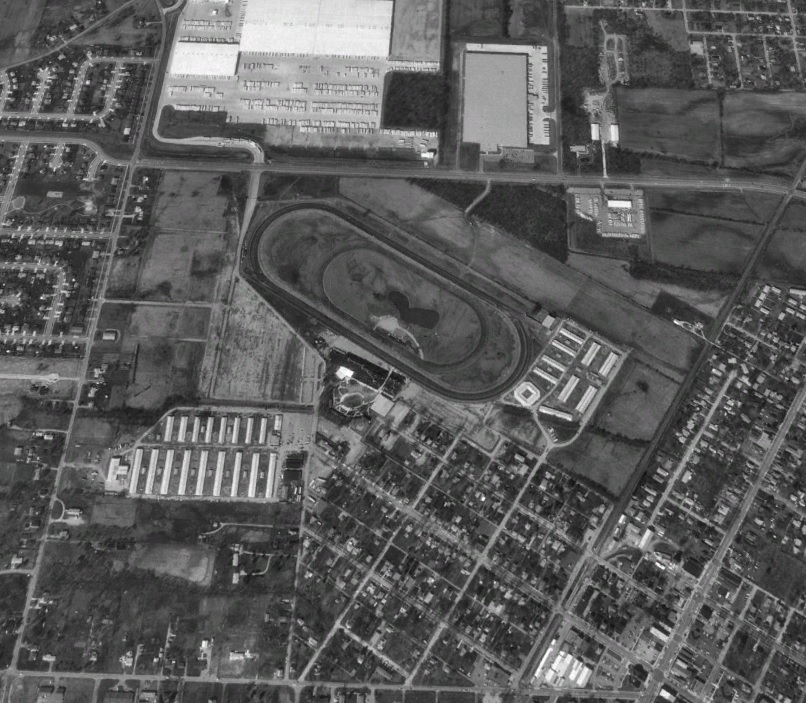
Aerial view of the facility in 1994

Beulah Park opened in Grove City, Ohio, a suburb of Columbus, in 1923. It was the first thoroughbred racetrack in Ohio. At its close it was one of only three tracks in Ohio to offer live thoroughbred racing, the others being Thistledown in North Randall and River Downs in Cincinnati. In 1983, Beulah Park was the first Ohio track to offer simulcast wagering on the Kentucky Derby.

Beulah Park was owned in part or whole from 1923 to May 1983, sixty years, by the Robert Dienst Family. Robert J. Dienst owned and operated the track until his death on August 19, 1959. Robert J. Dienst was most famous for the 1956 and 1957 American Champion Sprint Horse, Decathlon. Robert J. was a bit of a showboat and made gambling fun to the public. After his death, his son, Robert Y. Dienst who was conservative, took over and rebuilt the track, especially the backside when a fire broke out circa 1959. He poured the profits right back into the track, making it a showplace, not just for the general public but for the horsemen. Around 1959, an all wood barn with 40 horses perished in a night time blaze. Because of this, Robert Y. Dienst built almost all concrete block with tin roof barns from then on—having a full-time construction crew just for that purpose. Horsemen and Horsewomen appreciated the care that was taken towards their horses. He had a small stable, River Divide Farm, of about a dozen horses that he raced with the guidance of Trainer & Starter Don Rose up until his death on Nov. 7, 1996 (when Robert Y. was hours shy of his 80th birthday). Robert Y. Dienst's son, "Bob M." Dienst, left working at Beulah in the Spring of 1981 because of a management style disagreement with the then general manager, Mr. Houser (this was during 1981). Bob M. Dienst now resides in Albuquerque, New Mexico doing real estate. Robert Y. Dienst's son-in-law, Thomas E. Heinl worked in charge of Parimutuels (from 1975 to 1986) -- computerizing the Totalization equipment, the first to do so in the eastern part of the United States. Tom Heinl revolutionized the way parimutuel tickets are sold even today.

The track was sold to George Gaulding in May 1983 for about $4.5 million. The name was changed to Darby Downs for two years, and it appeared that some interesting things happened under that new regime: for example like two decades of racing records disappeared. In 1985 the track was resold to Charles Ruma, a building developer, (for just over $6.5 Million) and the name was returned to Beulah Park. Ruma poured millions into the track making it better for the general public. The track was resold to Penn National in May 2010 for approximately 37 million dollars, about four million shy of what Penn National paid also at the same time for Thistledown (Race Track) in Cleveland.

In 2011, Penn National Gaming, the owner of Beulah Park, announced plans to relocate the track and all operations to Dayton, Ohio. The new track would come at a cost of $200 million and create over 1,500 jobs in Dayton. Construction was contingent on video slot machine approval by the state. Penn National decided to transfer the license of Raceway Park in Toledo to the new Dayton facility instead.

In 2013, the transfer of the Beulah Park license was approved for a new facility in Austintown, Ohio, a suburb of Youngstown. The $125 million facility will be called Hollywood Gaming at Mahoning Valley Race Course, and will create approximately 1,000 jobs. As with the Dayton facility, video lottery terminals were approved. The new racino was scheduled to open in 2014.

Starting in May, 2013, Beulah Park served as the temporary home for River Downs 2013 horse racing season while a new casino/race track was constructed at River Downs Cincinnati location. The facility will close after 2013 as River Downs returns to Cincinnati, and the Beulah Park license transfers to Youngstown. The final day of live racing at Beulah Park was May 3, 2014.

Beulah Park was bought by developer, Pat Kelley of Falco, Smith & Kelley Ltd.. The plans include single households, condos, apartments, townhouse-style condos and a 102-unit senior luxury independent living facility and 75-unit assisted living building. The plans will also include office and retail space and a 60-acre park or green space.

Grove City Planning Commission gave the development plans a green light at their Dec. 4, 2017 meeting.

Kelley plans groundbreaking in the spring of 2018. In 2021, the first residents began occupying the 220 acre development that was previously Beulah Park.

== Other events ==
During the off-season, Beulah Park is home to concerts and fireworks displays. The park is the host to the second largest Mud Volleyball tournament in the world, with more than thirty courts. The Epilepsy Foundation annually hosts the event on the Beulah Park grounds.
