= Hollywood Casino at Kansas Speedway =

Casino in Kansas, United States

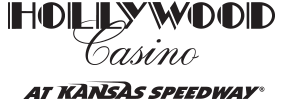

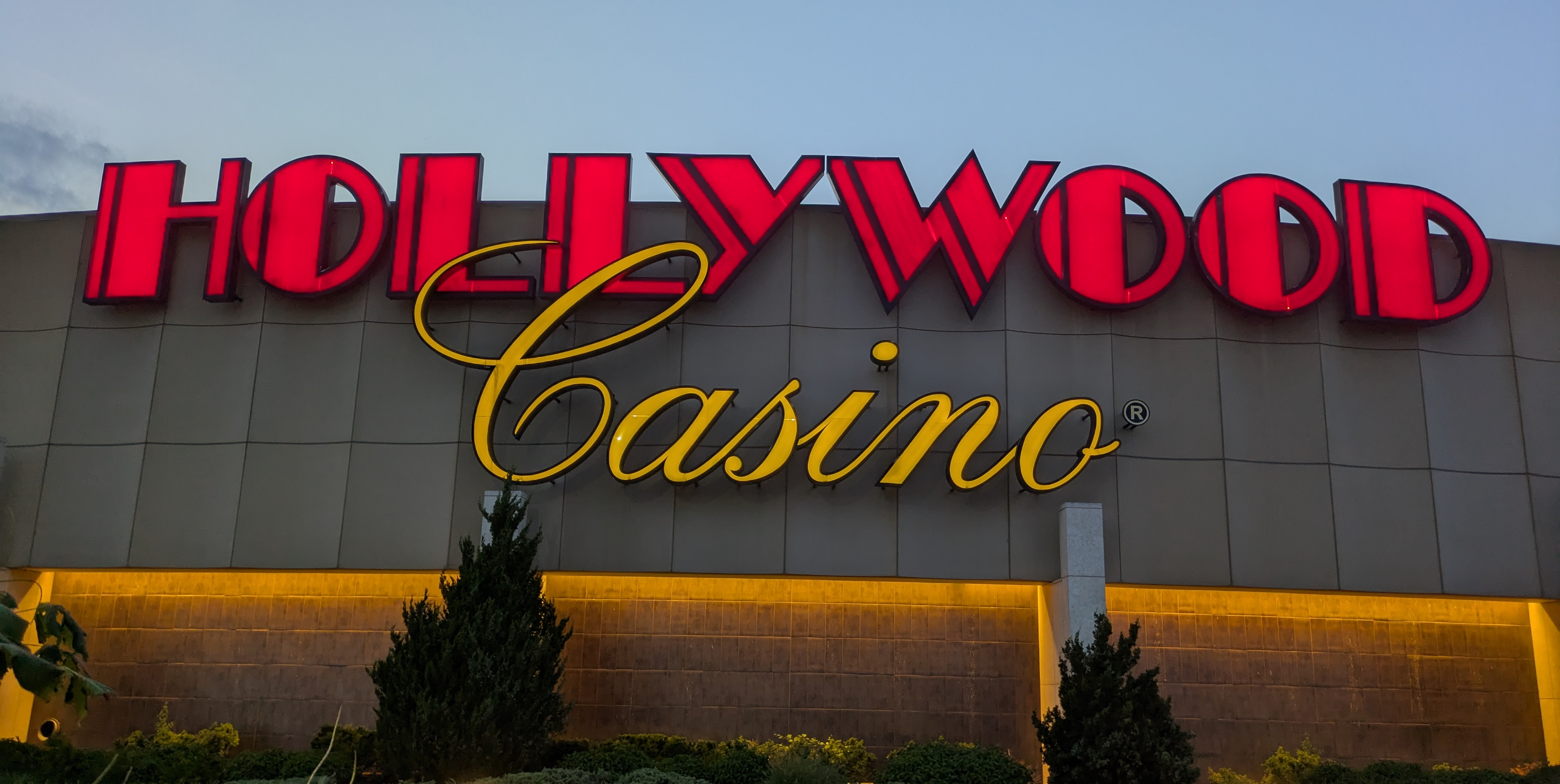
- Interactive map of Hollywood Casino at Kansas Speedway
- Location: Kansas City, Kansas; 777 Hollywood Casino Boulevard; 39.1113°N 94.8274°W
- Opened: February 3, 2012
- Casino type: Land-based
- Operating license holder: Penn Entertainment
- Website: www.hollywoodcasinokansas.com

Hollywood Casino at Kansas Speedway is a casino located adjacent to the Kansas Speedway in the Village West area of Kansas City, Kansas. It opened on February 3, 2012 with it currently being operated by Penn Entertainment.

== History ==
=== Battle for state-owned casino bid ===
Starting in 2004, proposals by the Kickapoo tribe and the Sac and Fox Nation to build a state-regulated casino at a budget of $210 million west of the track were made to the Kansas Legislature. The proposal to allow state-run casinos faced heavy opposition from several businessmen and lobbying groups, stating that the casino's revenue under the bill was too low along with chances of potential government corruption. By March 2005, Doug Mays, speaker of the Kansas House of Representatives, declared that the tribes' compact was killed in the current session unless they allowed the state to inspect slot machines.

Within the next two years, four more proposals were made. In 2007, another proposal was made in a joint venture by the track and The Cordish Companies to compete with five other proposals that planned to build near the area, including competition from Las Vegas Sands and Pinnacle Entertainment. With this, the Unified Government opted to hear all proposals by the end of the year, with all proposals having varying budgets. The track later stated that their 500-room hotel and casino would cost around $600 million. In October, a seventh proposal was added, along with the track proposal stating that no eminent domain land would be used. By December, the government heard three proposals. The project later received criticism from government watchdog group Americans For Prosperity-Kansas for being too related and being funded by revenue bonds or prior tax financing; something the group argued was illegal under Kansas law. By March 2008, the group filed a lawsuit in the Kansas Supreme Court against the state-owned Kansas Lottery claiming that the project would "create an illegal tax"; however, the law itself was viewed itself as "extremely murky" by Kansas City Star writer Rick Alm on whether the law's wording was retroactive. The next month, Las Vegas Sands opted to submit their proposal despite Kansas Lottery refusing to hear it.

=== Seminole Hard Rock Hotel & Casino Kansas City proposal ===
In May, Kansas Lottery approved five proposals in Wyandotte County. On June 27, the Kansas Supreme Court ruled that state-owned casinos were constitutional, resuming the bid for a casino near the track. Two months later, Lesa France Kennedy endorsed the track's bid, adding the promise of a second NASCAR Cup Series race weekend if the Kansas government chose the track's proposal. The next month, the track promised the addition of an infield road course if they were selected. Three days before the decision, Pinnacle withdrew their proposal as part of consequences of Unified Government officials appearing in a promotional video along with stagnation in the United States' economy. On September 19, Kansas Lottery gave the track and The Cordish Companies their approval to build a $705 million casino branded under the Hard Rock Hotel & Casino name.

=== Casino delays ===
The first phase of opening was slated for a June 2009 date; however, this was later slated to sometime later in the year. In addition, The Cordish Cos. threatened to end their partnership due to a local Kansas City proposed law banning indoor smoking, but they later backtracked the threat; the city later gave exemptions to the casino for smoking. However, in December, as part of consequences due to the Great Recession, the partnership backed out, with the partnership hoping to reapply in the near future when the economy rose. In January, the partnership announced plans to resubmit their proposal by April 1. On March 31, the decision was confirmed, with the partnership now having to go against two other proposals: one from Penn Entertainment and one from Golden Heartland. By May, the Kansas Speedway partnership and Penn Entertainment's proposals managed to advance further into the planning stages. Due to the Great Recession and its effects, both proposals, which initially had budgets of over $600 million, were cut to around $350 million for both proposals.

In September, the two proposals essentially merged into one when Penn Entertainment bought out The Cordish Cos. As a result of the buyout, the Hard Rock branding was scrapped in favor of a Hollywood-themed casino, with an approval decision for the new $521 million proposal to come in December. Despite being the only proposal left, the Kansas Lottery stated that they would not become a "rubber stamp" for the proposal despite renewed promises of a second NASCAR Cup Series race weekend. On December 1, the Kansas Lottery approved the proposal without the hotel at a budget of $386 million, with a planned opening date in early 2012. The project was given the final go-ahead in February 2010, when the Kansas Racing and Gaming Commission signed off licensing background checks.

=== Construction of Hollywood Casino, schedule changes ===
Boreger stepped down from track leadership to run Kansas Entertainment and the casino, promoting the track's vice president of marketing and sales, Patrick Warren, to run the track in March 2010. Warren announced a desire to rebound from effects from the Great Recession. On April 28, the final casino plan was announced, calling for around 2,300 slot machines, around 1,050 employees, and a 300-room hotel expansion on a 268,000 square foot plot of land. Groundbreaking on the Hollywood Casino commenced on April 30, 2010. As a result of France Kennedy's promise of a second Cup Series race weekend if the casino was built, the future of the IndyCar Series at the track was left uncertain due to scheduling conflicts. In July, ISC petitioned for the track to get a second Cup Series race weekend, and by August 7, the Kansas City Star reported that the track would get a second race weekend. On August 10, NASCAR officially confirmed the second NASCAR race weekend, along with the track announcing the addition of lights for night racing. The next month, IndyCar announced their departure from the track. The casino's topping out ceremony was performed on March 23, 2011, with the casino opening to the public on February 3, 2012.

The facility opened a renovated sportsbook beneath the Turn2 Sports Bar and Restaurant in December 2023, which was rebranded as ESPN Bet in August 2024.

== Facility ==
Hollywood Casino at Kansas Speedway's gaming area contains over 1,500 slot machines, 35 table games, and a sportsbook.

=== Dining ===
Four restaurants are located within the facility. Final Cut Steakhouse is a fine-dining steakhouse offering steaks, seafood, pasta, and desserts. Marquee Café is a casual dining establishment serving American-style dishes for breakfast, lunch, and dinner. Turn 2 Sports Bar & Restaurant is a sports bar with views of the second turn of Kansas Speedway and the casino floor. Pit Stop is a quick-service restaurant offering sandwiches, salads, and pizza by the slice.

== See also ==
- List of casinos in Kansas
- Hollywood Casino 400
