= Jamul Casino =

Native American casino

Coordinates: 32.702778°N 116.870833°W

Jamul Casino Resort
- Interactive map of Jamul Casino Resort
- Location: 14145 Campo Road Jamul, California 91935
- Opened: October 2016
- Notable restaurants: Prime Cut, Loft 94, Tony Gwynn's Sports Pub
- Owner: Jamul Indian Village
- Website: http://www.jamulcasino.com

Jamul Casino Resort is a Native American gambling enterprise run by the Jamul Indian Village on their 6-acre reservation in Jamul, California. The casino has 1,700 slot machines and 40 table games. It is located 20 miles east of downtown San Diego. It was formerly the Hollywood Casino Jamul-San Diego. The president and general manager is Mary Cheeks.

== History ==
In 1999, the Tipai Band of Kumeyaay Indians, with 64 members living on 6 acres (24,000 m^{2}) of sovereign land in the Jamul area designated the "Jamul Indian Village," announced their intent to develop a new hotel and casino. The original plan, which required the US government to annex 81 acres (330,000 m^{2}) of surrounding land to complete the project, met with strong opposition from local residents. After the annexation effort was denied, the casino plan was revised to fit the 6-acre (24,000 m^{2}) reservation grounds. Despite continuing opposition from townspeople, a ceremonial groundbreaking took place on December 10, 2005.

The $200 million project was financed by Lakes Entertainment of Minnesota. The casino's original concept was to be developed according to the State of California's gambling compact. Proponents emphasize increased revenue for the state and the tribe, as well as 2,000 new jobs for all members of the community, while opponents fear strain on its police and fire services, a major impact on the local water supply, and argue that a 15-story building would permanently change the town's character. The chief concern is the increased traffic on the main road through the town, Highway 94. The proposed casino location is such that all the traffic to and from would likely pass through the middle of the town.

On February 7, 2003, the U.S. Bureau of Indian Affairs held a meeting to discuss the environmental impact report produced by the Jamul Indian Tribe in support of the casino project. Hundreds of Jamul residents showed up to express almost unanimous opposition to the casino.

On September 13, 2006, casino organizers held a meeting with the townspeople on site to address their concerns. The casino plan was further clarified, with an artist's conception of the proposed six-story casino and 12-story hotel complex on display. A court reporter was on hand to receive comments for or against the proposal, and of the 40 who did so, three were in favor. Most of the negative comments were in regard to increased traffic on California State Route 94, which narrows to a two-lane road at the proposed site of casino.

On March 10, 2007, the tribe evicted three residents (not tribal members) who had been living on the Indian Village land but who opposed the casino: Karen Toggery and her son and Walter Rosales. Locals gathered to protest the evictions. The Tribe hired a local security company and "deputized" them as "Jamul Tribal Police." These guards then utilized pepper spray and metal batons on some of the protestors who trespassed onto Tribal property and refused to leave. Tribal chairman Leon Acebedo signed an agreement witnessed by local Board of Supervisors member Dianne Jacob that stipulated that the homes of the evicted would not be destroyed for at least seven days. Their homes were demolished two days later, leading to considerable controversy in the community. An unrelated statement was released that same day stating that the tribal leaders no longer wished to negotiate with the state regarding the casino and were planning a casino with Class II games only, which do not include slot machines, as casinos with only Class II games are not governed by compacts with the State of California.

On October 1, 2008, the tribe sued Caltrans after months of unsuccessful negotiations. The tribe claimed their sovereignty gives them the right to use the land that they see fit. Caltrans maintained that they represent the public's safety and that they would not approve the permits to put a stoplight in the middle of State Route 94 unless more environmental impact studies (EIR) were performed. The tribe continued to maintain that Caltrans’ preferred, safe alternative of building a driveway off a side road, Melody Lane, was “improper meddling by the state”. In the article cited above, a member of the tribe's Executive Council, Carlene Chamberlain, stated “The Minnesota company backing the casino, Lakes Entertainment, can't get funding for design and construction until it's clear that gamblers will be able to get to the slot machines.”

During Lakes Entertainment's review of their 2008 results on March 12, 2009, they indicated that the Jamul Indian Tribe and Caltrans' had reached an understanding and that the Jamul Indian Tribe had agreed to create an EIR for the revised project. Lakes indicated also that the project would be re-evaluated in light of the financial environment and would be monitored closely. Although Lakes did say they would not abandon the project completely, they reduced the "fair market value" of the project by 80%. In addition, Lakes revised their estimate of when the project could be completed to 2014.

On March 13, 2012, Lakes Entertainment cancelled their development contract with the Jamul Indian Tribe. Immediately following that, the tribe announced plans to work with the community to design a smaller facility that addressed many of the Jamul resident's concerns. Finding a new partner for this development was made more difficult because of the $57 million the tribe owed Lakes from the previous development as well as the fact that the tribe only had authorization to run a Class II gaming facility from the government, having turned down the terms and conditions of a Class III gaming facility from the state.

Penn National Gaming became the developer, lender and manager of the $400 million Hollywood Casino in collaboration with the Jamul Indian Village. Hollywood Casino Jamul – San Diego opened on October 10, 2016. The casino includes a three-story gaming and entertainment facility of approximately 200,000 square feet, featuring over 1,700 slot machines, 40 live table games, multiple restaurants, bars and lounges and an enclosed below grade parking structure with approximately 1,800 spaces.

In May 2018, the Penn National Gaming Corp., which owns the Hollywood casinos chain of 27 gambling properties, deflagged the casino and handed over management of it to the Jamul Indian Village Development Corp.
