= Hollywood Gaming at Mahoning Valley Race Course =

Horse racing venue and casino in Ohio

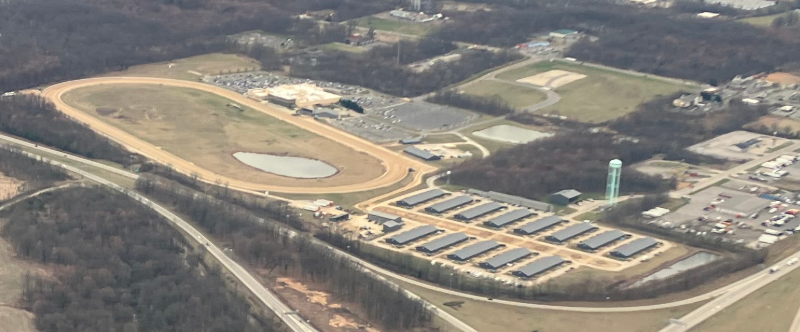
- Interactive map of Hollywood Gaming at Mahoning Valley Race Course
- Location: Austintown, Ohio, U.S.; 655 North Canfield Niles Road, Youngstown, Ohio, U.S.; 41°07′01″N 80°45′42″W
- Opened: September 17, 2014
- Gaming space: 100,000 sq ft (9,300 m^{2})
- Casino type: Racino
- Owner: Gaming and Leisure Properties
- Operating license holder: Penn Entertainment
- Website: hollywoodmahoningvalley.com

Hollywood Gaming at Mahoning Valley Race Course is a thoroughbred racino in Austintown, Ohio, United States. It is owned by Gaming and Leisure Properties and operated by Penn Entertainment.

== History ==
Construction on Mahoning Valley Race Course, located on Ohio Route 46, began on May 30, 2013. Mahoning Valley Race Course opened on September 17, 2014. The facility features a one-mile dirt course with grandstand, and a gaming area that displays nearly 1,000 video lottery terminals.

The track replaces Beulah Park Racetrack in Columbus, Ohio. Racing operations at Mahoning Valley began on November 24, 2014.

== Physical attributes ==
The track features a one-mile oval racetrack over which the thoroughbreds race. The track is 80 feet wide, and is banked at 3% in the stretches and 6% in the turns. The stretch run is 1,000 feet long.

There are two (2) main wagering areas – 1st floor, and the Simulcast Teletheater on the 2nd Floor. Wagering machines are available on both levels.

The backstretch consists of 13 barns with stabling for up to 988 horses, and a receiving barn which has 54 stalls. The receiving barn is used by horses that will be coming in the day of the race from another track or farm to race. Dormitories are available for employees of the horse trainers, the building has 84 rooms that can house 2 (two) people in each room, capacity of 168. There is no charge to horsemen for barn stall space but they will be charged for the dormitory space. The dormitory will have a lounge and vending machines available for horseman.

== Racing ==
In its second season of racing, Mahoning Valley Racecourse has seen gains in both wagering and overnight purses. In March, 2015, overnight purses raised by 5%. The average daily purse at the end of the 2015 winter/spring meet was $76,000. Prior to the second racing season, officials at Mahoning Valley announced another purse increase, during the 2015-16 meet, overnight purses averaged more than $106,000. This number competes aggressively with both Thistledown Racino in nearby North Randall and Mountaineer Racetrack in nearby West Virginia. MVRC announced at the end of 2017 a 5-7% purse increase. Purses for maiden special weights increased from $21,000 to $22,100 and allowance races will be as high as $29,000.

During the 2015-16 racing season, Mahoning Valley Racecourse announced two open stakes races added to its stakes schedule. The $200,000 Steel Valley Sprint Stakes, a six-furlong dash for 3-year-old horses, became the tracks signature race. At the conclusion of the 2018 spring meet, the track announced a $50,00 increase in the sprint, making the total purse $250,000. The $75,000 Hollywood Gaming Mahoning Distaff, also a six-furlong dash, was also added. These two races become part of a 23-race, $5.35 million Penn Gaming Racing Challenge.

Notable Jockey's who have ridden at Mahoning Valley include Corey Lanerie, Florent Geroux, Irad Ortiz, Jr., Trevor McCarthy, Ricardo Santana, Jr., Jose Valdivia Jr., Paco Lopez, Channing Hill, Javier Castellano and Deshawn Parker.

== Stakes schedule ==
The 2026 racing schedule features 18 stakes races, three (3) open stakes and eleven (11) Ohio State bred stakes races. Also in 2026, Mahoning Valley Racecourse will host five (5) Best Of Ohio Day Ohio bred stakes races.

Open Stakes Races

- $300,000 Steel Valley Sprint
- $200,000 Cheryl C. White Memorial Stakes
- $100,000 Mahoning Valley Distaff Sprint

Ohio Bred Stakes Races

- $75,000 Southern Park Stakes
- $75,000 Howard B. Noonan Stakes
- $75,000 Glacial Princess Stakes
- $75,000 Cardinal Stakes
- $75,000 First Lady Stakes
- $75,000 Leona's Reward Stakes
- $75,000 Ruff/Kirchberg Memorial Stakes
- $75,000 Joshua Radosevich Memorial Stakes
- $75,000 Bobbie Bricker Memorial Stakes

Best of Ohio Day

- $100,000 The Best of Ohio Distaff Stakes
- $100,000 The Best of Ohio Endurance Stakes
- $100,000 The Best of Ohio Sprint Stakes
- $100,000 John W. Galbreath Stakes
- $100,000 Juvenile Stakes

== See also ==
- List of casinos in Ohio
