= Spend a Buck =

American-bred Thoroughbred racehorse

Spend A Buck
- Sire: Buckaroo
- Grandsire: Buckpasser
- Dam: Belle de Jour
- Damsire: Speak John
- Sex: Stallion
- Foaled: 1982
- Country: United States
- Color: Brown
- Breeder: C. Rowe Harper, Irish Hill Farm
- Owner: Hunter Farm (Dennis Diaz)
- Trainer: Cam Gambolati
- Record: 15: 10–3–2
- Earnings: $4,220,689

Major wins
- Arlington-Washington Futurity Stakes (1984); Cherry Hill Mile Stakes (1985); Garden State Stakes (1985); Jersey Derby (1985); Monmouth Handicap (1985) U.S. Triple Crown series: Kentucky Derby (1985)

Awards
- U.S. Champion 3-Yr-Old Colt (1985); United States Horse of the Year (1985)

Honors
- Calder Race Course Hall of Fame (1995); Spend a Buck Stakes at Monmouth Park; Spend a Buck Handicap at Calder Race Course
- Last updated on February 8, 2007

Spend a Buck (May 15, 1982 in Daviess County, Kentucky – November 24, 2002, in Brazil) was an American Thoroughbred racehorse who won the 1985 Kentucky Derby.

== Background ==
Spend a Buck was sired by Buckaroo out of the dam Belle de Jour. Through his son Einstein (BRZ), he is now the primary source for the Buckpasser sire line in the United States. Spend a Buck is inbred 5x5 to Prince Rose and is line bred 5x8x8x6 to Man o' War, while his sire Buckaroo is inbred 4x5 to Blue Larkspur and La Troienne.

== Racing career ==
On May 4, 1985, Spend a Buck won the Kentucky Derby by 5-3/4 lengths over Stephan's Odyssey under jockey Angel Cordero Jr. His 2:00 1/5 time is the fourth fastest as of 2023. He paid $10.20, $5.40, and $3.40. It was his trainer Cam Gambolati's first attempt to win the Derby, a feat not matched again until 2003 when Barclay Tagg saddled Funny Cide for his win.

Earlier in the season, Spend a Buck had won two races at the newly reopened Garden State Park Racetrack in Cherry Hill, New Jersey: the Cherry Hill Mile Stakes on April 6 and the Garden State Stakes on April 20. Before the season began, Garden State Park owner Robert Brennan had put up a $2-million bonus to the horse that won the two April preparatory races, the Kentucky Derby, and the May 27 Jersey Derby, Garden State's signature race.

Spend a Buck's owner, Dennis Diaz, opted to skip the Preakness Stakes and the Belmont Stakes and thus trade Spend a Buck's chance to win the Triple Crown for a shot at the bonus. Cordero, Spend a Buck's regular jockey, was committed to another race that day, so Hall of Fame jockey Laffit Pincay Jr. rode Spend a Buck at Garden State. Spend a Buck won the Jersey Derby by a neck over eventual Belmont winner Creme Fraiche, capturing a $2.6-million prize, the then largest single purse in American racing history. That record stood for 19 years, until Smarty Jones won the 2004 Kentucky Derby.

Because Spend a Buck skipped the last two legs of the Triple Crown, the Triple Crown races put up a bonus of their own to encourage participation in the series.

Spend a Buck set a track record of 146.80 for a mile and an eighth in winning the 1985 Monmouth Handicap (now known as the Philip H. Iselin Stakes), which stood for 37 years until broken in 2022.

== Honors and awards ==
Spend a Buck was voted the 1985 Eclipse Award for Horse of the Year and Champion Three-Year-Old Colt.

Several races were named for Spend a Buck, including the Spend a Buck Stakes at Monmouth Park and the Grade III Spend a Buck Handicap at Calder Race Course.

== Stud career ==
Spend a Buck had a successful post-racing career standing stud, siring 27 stakes winners with earnings of over $16 million. He died on November 24, 2002, at Haras Bage do Sul in Brazil following an anaphylactic reaction to penicillin.

== Pedigree ==
Pedigree of Spend a Buck
| Sire Buckaroo | Buckpasser | Tom Fool | Menow |
| Sire Buckaroo | Buckpasser | Tom Fool | Gaga |
| Sire Buckaroo | Buckpasser | Busanda | War Admiral |
| Sire Buckaroo | Buckpasser | Busanda | Businesslike |
| Sire Buckaroo | Stepping High | No Robbery | Swaps |
| Sire Buckaroo | Stepping High | No Robbery | Bimlette |
| Sire Buckaroo | Stepping High | Bebop II | Prince Bio |
| Sire Buckaroo | Stepping High | Bebop II | Cappellina |
| Dam Belle de Jour | Speak John | Prince John | Princequillo |
| Dam Belle de Jour | Speak John | Prince John | Not Afraid |
| Dam Belle de Jour | Speak John | Nuit de Folies | Tornado |
| Dam Belle de Jour | Speak John | Nuit de Folies | Folle Nuit |
| Dam Belle de Jour | Battle Dress | Jaipur | Nasrullah |
| Dam Belle de Jour | Battle Dress | Jaipur | Rare Perfume |
| Dam Belle de Jour | Battle Dress | Armorial | Battlefield |
| Dam Belle de Jour | Battle Dress | Armorial | Tellaris |
