= NASCAR Cup Series at Kansas Speedway =

Annual NASCAR Cup Series races at Kansas Speedway

NASCAR Cup Series
- Venue: Kansas Speedway
- Location: Kansas City, Kansas, United States

Circuit information
- Surface: Asphalt
- Length: 1.5 mi (2.4 km)
- Turns: 4

Stock car racing events in the NASCAR Cup Series have been held annually at the Kansas Speedway in Kansas City, Kansas, since 2001.

Kansas received a second date beginning in 2011 part of a NASCAR schedule realignment. Both races are 267 laps and 400.5 miles (644.542 km) each.

== Spring race ==
AdventHealth 400
- Corporate sponsor: AdventHealth
- First race: 2011
- Distance: 400.5 miles (644.542 km)
- Laps: 267; Stage 1: 80; Stage 2: 85; Final stage: 102
- Previous names: STP 400 (2011–2013); 5-Hour Energy 400 (2014); SpongeBob SquarePants 400 (2015); Go Bowling 400 (2016–2017); KC Masterpiece 400 (2018); Digital Ally 400 (2019); Super Start Batteries 400 presented by O'Reilly Auto Parts (2020); Buschy McBusch Race 400 (2021)
- Most wins (driver): Denny Hamlin (3)
- Most wins (team): Joe Gibbs Racing (6)
- Most wins (manufacturer): Toyota (9)

The AdventHealth 400 is the current name for the NASCAR Cup Series' spring race at the track. Tyler Reddick is the defending winner, having won the event in 2026.

=== History ===
On August 18, 2010, the final calendar for the 2011 season was revealed, having a second date for Kansas in the Spring. Like the other race at Kansas, the distance of the race was 400.5 miles (644.542 km). The inaugural race was held on June 5, 2011. Brad Keselowski won the inaugural running of the race The next year, in order to complete the track's reconfiguration, the race was moved to April.

In 2014, the race swapped dates with the Southern 500 and was held in May under the lights for the first time.

The race has undergone various name changes throughout its history. After being known as the STP 400 from 2011 to 2013, it was renamed the "5-hour Energy 400 Benefiting Special Operations Warrior Foundation" in 2014. Nickelodeon sponsored the 2015 race via the SpongeBob SquarePants television show, followed by GoBowling.com from 2016 to 2017. KC Masterpiece and Digital Ally respectively assumed naming rights in 2018 and 2019, followed by O'Reilly Auto Parts' Super Start Batteries brand in 2020.

In 2020, the race was moved to a Sunday afternoon time and the weekend after the Coca-Cola 600 at Charlotte, but the COVID-19 pandemic resulted in it being postponed to July 23 as a Thursday night event.

In 2021, Busch Beer, one of NASCAR's premier partners announced that they would be sponsoring the race as the "Busch Name This Race 400", as the company announced that fans would have the opportunity to choose another name for the race through a contest on their website. Fans paid $1 to participate, which went to the non-profit charity Farm Rescue. The winning name was "Buschy McBusch Race 400".

In 2022, AdventHealth became the new title sponsor of the Cup and Truck Series spring races at Kansas. The Cup Series race was titled the "AdventHealth 400". The 2024 edition played host to the closest finish in NASCAR Cup Series history at 0.001 seconds between the winner, Kyle Larson, and Chris Buescher, who finished 2nd.

=== Past winners ===
Year	Date	No.	Driver	Team	Manufacturer	Race distance		Race time	Average speed (mph)	Report	Ref
Year	Date	No.	Driver	Team	Manufacturer	Laps	Miles (km)	Race time	Average speed (mph)	Report	Ref
2011	June 5	2	Brad Keselowski	Penske Racing	Dodge	267	400.5 (644.542)	2:55:10	137.184	Report	
2012	April 22	11	Denny Hamlin	Joe Gibbs Racing	Toyota	267	400.5 (644.542)	2:46:44	144.122	Report	
2013	April 21	20	Matt Kenseth	Joe Gibbs Racing	Toyota	267	400.5 (644.542)	2:59:51	133.611	Report	
2014	May 10	24	Jeff Gordon	Hendrick Motorsports	Chevrolet	267	400.5 (644.542)	3:07:31	128.149	Report	
2015	May 9–10*	48	Jimmie Johnson	Hendrick Motorsports	Chevrolet	267	400.5 (644.542)	3:11:50	125.265	Report	
2016	May 7	18	Kyle Busch	Joe Gibbs Racing	Toyota	267	400.5 (644.542)	2:49:20	141.909	Report	
2017	May 13	78	Martin Truex Jr.	Furniture Row Racing	Toyota	267	400.5 (644.542)	3:24:16	117.64	Report	
2018	May 12	4	Kevin Harvick	Stewart–Haas Racing	Ford	267	400.5 (644.542)	2:53:38	128.395	Report	
2019	May 11	2	Brad Keselowski	Team Penske	Ford	271*	406.5 (654.198)	3:06:09	131.023	Report	
2020	July 23*	11	Denny Hamlin	Joe Gibbs Racing	Toyota	267	400.5 (644.542)	3:17:14	121.835	Report	
2021	May 2	18	Kyle Busch	Joe Gibbs Racing	Toyota	267	400.5 (644.542)	3:05:21	129.647	Report	
2022	May 15	45	Kurt Busch	23XI Racing	Toyota	267	400.5 (644.542)	3:13:03	124.476	Report	
2023	May 7	11	Denny Hamlin	Joe Gibbs Racing	Toyota	267	400.5 (644.542)	3:24:24	117.564	Report	
2024	May 5	5	Kyle Larson	Hendrick Motorsports	Chevrolet	268*	402 (646.956)	3:10:42	126.481	Report	
2025	May 11	5	Kyle Larson	Hendrick Motorsports	Chevrolet	267	400.5 (644.542)	3:05:13	129.74	Report	
2026	April 19	45	Tyler Reddick	23XI Racing	Toyota	274*	411 (661.44)	2:48:39	146.22	Report	
2027	May 8									Report	

Notes

- 2015: Race started on Saturday and finished shortly after midnight on Sunday due to rain delays.
- 2019, 2024, and 2026: Race was extended due to a NASCAR overtime finish.
- 2020: Race was postponed from May 31 to July 23 due to the COVID-19 pandemic.

==== Multiple winners (drivers) ====
# Wins	Driver	Years won
3	Denny Hamlin	2012, 2020, 2023
2	Brad Keselowski	2011, 2019
2	Kyle Busch	2016, 2021
2	Kyle Larson	2024–2025

==== Multiple winners (teams) ====
# Wins	Team	Years won
6	Joe Gibbs Racing	2012–2013, 2016, 2020–2021, 2023
4	Hendrick Motorsports	2014–2015, 2024–2025
2	Team Penske	2011, 2019
2	23XI Racing	2022, 2026

==== Manufacturer wins ====
# Wins	Manufacturer	Years won
9	Toyota	2012–2013, 2016–2017, 2020–2023, 2026
4	Chevrolet	2014–2015, 2024–2025
2	Ford	2018–2019
1	Dodge	2011

== Fall race ==
Hollywood Casino 400
- Corporate sponsor: Hollywood Casino at Kansas Speedway
- First race: 2001
- Distance: 400.5 miles (644.54 km)
- Laps: 267; Stages 1/2: 80 each Final stage: 107
- Previous names: Protection One 400 (2001–2002); Banquet 400 Presented by ConAgra Foods (2003–2006); LifeLock 400 (2007); Camping World RV 400 presented by Coleman (2008); Price Chopper 400 presented by Kraft Foods (2009–2010)
- Most wins (driver): Joey Logano (3)
- Most wins (team): Hendrick Motorsports (8)
- Most wins (manufacturer): Chevrolet (14)

The Hollywood Casino 400 is the current name for the NASCAR Cup Series' fall race at the track. This is the fourth of ten races in the NASCAR Chase. Kyle Larson is the defending winner of the event, having won it in 2026.

=== History ===
As part of the oval track construction boom in the 1990s, in December 1996, the International Speedway Corporation (ISC) announced preliminary plans to find a location to build a $100 million, 120,000-seat capacity track. An official for ISC, John Story, mentioned that the Kansas City metropolitan area was a suitable area that the company was looking at. At the end of negotiations in October 1997, the plot of land near I-70 and I-435 was chosen, with initial plans stating to sit 75,000 with room to expand to 150,000. The track's budget stated amounted to almost $200 million. The track's construction was scheduled to start in the spring of 1998 and was scheduled to be finished sometime in 2000.

Guarantee of a NASCAR Winston Cup race weekend was not given, with the NASCAR Winston Cup Series schedule experiencing growth in the 1990s; a "radical plan" was predicted to be needed in order to get a Winston Cup race weekend. Although construction had started several months earlier in September 1999, the project was delayed to the point where chances of an opening date in 2000 were "very small" according to ISC's Grant Lynch.

In September 2001, the track was able to hold its first Winston Cup Series race, with Jeff Gordon winning the inaugural event. The race would be held during the Chase/playoffs.

The race has had multiple sponsorships including: Protection One, LifeLock, Camping World and Price Chopper.

In 2011, the Hollywood Casino at Kansas Speedway took over the naming rights for the race. The race was also known as for sponsorship reasons as the Hollywood Casino 400 presented by ESPN BET. Today, the race is still a part of "The Chase".

=== Past winners ===
Year	Date	No.	Driver	Team	Manufacturer	Race distance		Race time	Average speed (mph)	Report	Ref
Year	Date	No.	Driver	Team	Manufacturer	Laps	Miles (km)	Race time	Average speed (mph)	Report	Ref
2001	September 30	24	Jeff Gordon	Hendrick Motorsports	Chevrolet	267	400.5 (644.542)	3:37:19	110.576	Report	
2002	September 29	24	Jeff Gordon	Hendrick Motorsports	Chevrolet	267	400.5 (644.542)	3:21:16	119.394	Report	
2003	October 5	12	Ryan Newman	Penske Racing	Dodge	267	400.5 (644.542)	3:17:34	121.63	Report	
2004	October 10	01	Joe Nemechek	MB2 Motorsports	Chevrolet	267	400.5 (644.542)	3:07:39	128.058	Report	
2005	October 9	6	Mark Martin	Roush Racing	Ford	267	400.5 (644.542)	2:54:25	137.774	Report	
2006	October 1	20	Tony Stewart	Joe Gibbs Racing	Chevrolet	267	400.5 (644.542)	3:17:22	121.753	Report	
2007	September 30	16	Greg Biffle	Roush Fenway Racing	Ford	210*	315 (506.943)	3:00:02	104.981	Report	
2008	September 28	48	Jimmie Johnson	Hendrick Motorsports	Chevrolet	267	400.5 (644.542)	2:59:56	133.549	Report	
2009	October 4	14	Tony Stewart	Stewart–Haas Racing	Chevrolet	267	400.5 (644.542)	2:55:13	137.144	Report	
2010	October 3	16	Greg Biffle	Roush Fenway Racing	Ford	267	400.5 (644.542)	2:54:02	138.077	Report	
2011	October 9	48	Jimmie Johnson	Hendrick Motorsports	Chevrolet	272*	408 (656.612)	2:58:27	137.181	Report	
2012*	October 21	17	Matt Kenseth	Roush Fenway Racing	Ford	267	400.5 (644.542)	3:28:48	115.086	Report	
2013	October 6	29	Kevin Harvick	Richard Childress Racing	Chevrolet	267	400.5 (644.542)	3:29:10	114.884	Report	
2014	October 5	22	Joey Logano	Team Penske	Ford	267	400.5 (644.542)	2:49:17	141.951	Report	
2015	October 18	22	Joey Logano	Team Penske	Ford	269*	403.5 (649.37)	2:58:22	135.732	Report	
2016	October 16	4	Kevin Harvick	Stewart–Haas Racing	Chevrolet	267	400.5 (644.542)	3:00:28	133.155	Report	
2017	October 22	78	Martin Truex Jr.	Furniture Row Racing	Toyota	267	400.5 (644.542)	3:11:57	125.189	Report	
2018	October 21	9	Chase Elliott	Hendrick Motorsports	Chevrolet	267	400.5 (644.542)	2:38:02	152.713	Report	
2019	October 20	11	Denny Hamlin	Joe Gibbs Racing	Toyota	277*	415.5 (668.682)	3:02:39	136.491	Report	
2020	October 18	22	Joey Logano	Team Penske	Ford	267	400.5 (644.542)	2:53:43	138.329	Report	
2021	October 24	5	Kyle Larson	Hendrick Motorsports	Chevrolet	267	400.5 (644.542)	3:03:49	130.728	Report	
2022	September 11	45	Bubba Wallace	23XI Racing	Toyota	267	400.5 (644.542)	3:10:03	126.44	Report	
2023	September 10	45	Tyler Reddick	23XI Racing	Toyota	268*	402 (646.956)	3:12:38	125.212	Report	
2024	September 29	1	Ross Chastain	Trackhouse Racing	Chevrolet	267	400.5 (644.542)	3:14:54	123.294	Report	
2025	September 28	9	Chase Elliott	Hendrick Motorsports	Chevrolet	273*	409.5 (659.026)	3:19:35	123.106	Report	
2026	September 27	5	Kyle Larson	Hendrick Motorsports	Chevrolet	267	400.5 (644.542)	2:52:41	136.156	Report	
2027	October 3									Report	

Notes

- 2007: The race was shortened due to darkness after two rain delays.
- 2011, 2015, 2019, 2023, and 2025: Races were extended due to NASCAR overtime.

==== Multiple winners (drivers) ====
# wins	Driver	Years won
3	Joey Logano	2014–2015, 2020
2	Jeff Gordon	2001–2002
2	Tony Stewart	2006, 2009
2	Greg Biffle	2007, 2010
2	Jimmie Johnson	2008, 2011
2	Kevin Harvick	2013, 2016
2	Chase Elliott	2018, 2025
2	Kyle Larson	2021, 2026

==== Multiple winners (teams) ====
# wins	Team	Years won
8	Hendrick Motorsports	2001, 2002, 2008, 2011, 2018, 2021, 2025, 2026
4	RFK Racing	2005, 2007, 2010, 2012
4	Team Penske	2003, 2014–2015, 2020
2	Stewart–Haas Racing	2009, 2016
2	Joe Gibbs Racing	2006, 2019
2	23XI Racing	2022–2023

==== Manufacturer wins ====
# wins	Manufacturer	Years won
14	Chevrolet	2001–2002, 2004, 2006, 2008–2009, 2011, 2013, 2016, 2018, 2021, 2024–2026
7	Ford	2005, 2007, 2010, 2012, 2014–2015, 2020
4	Toyota	2017, 2019, 2022–2023
1	Dodge	2003

Previous race: Würth 400	NASCAR Cup Series; AdventHealth 400	Next race: Ecosave 400

Previous race: Dollar Tree 301	NASCAR Cup Series; Hollywood Casino 400	Next race: South Point 400
