= Hollywood Casino Toledo =

Casino in Ohio, United States

Coordinates: 41°37′15″N 83°32′44″W

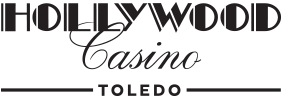

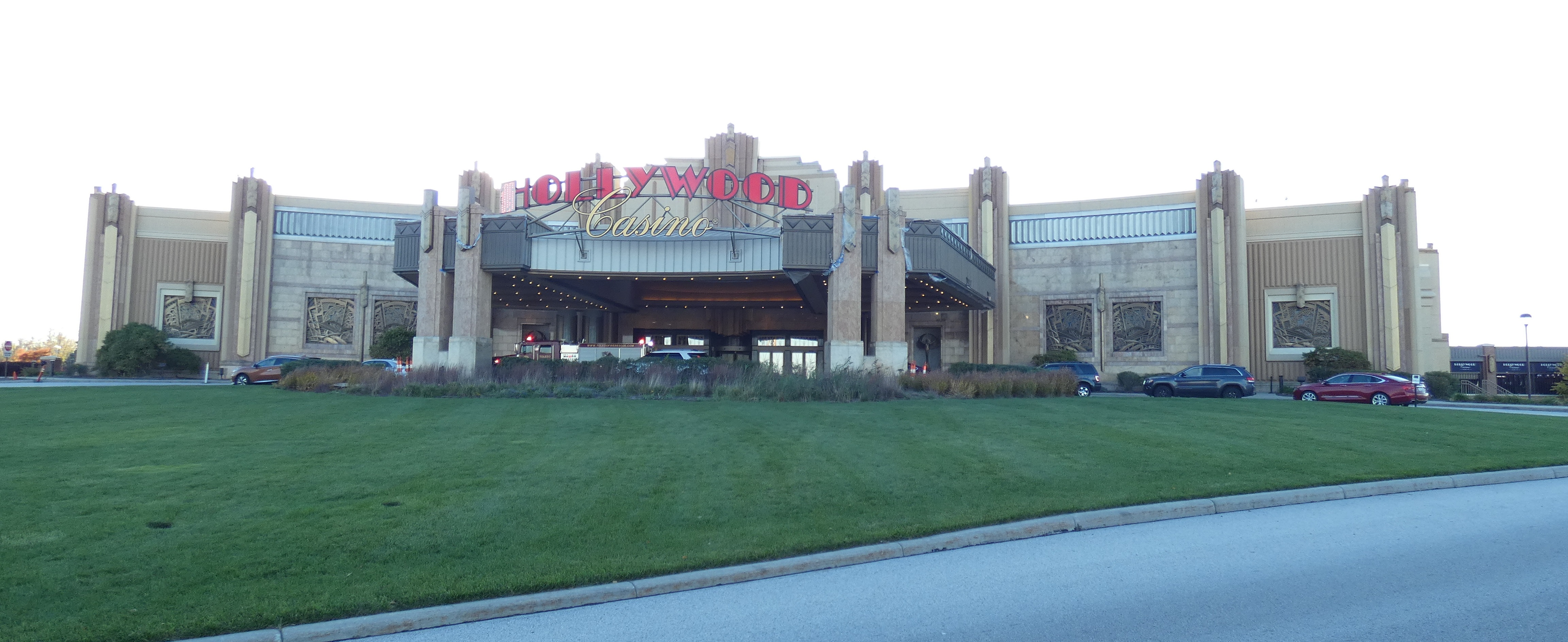
- Interactive map of Hollywood Casino Toledo
- Location: Toledo, Ohio; 777 Hollywood Boulevard
- Opened: May 29, 2012
- Gaming space: 125,000 sq ft (11,600 m^{2})
- Casino type: Land-based
- Owner: Gaming and Leisure Properties
- Operating license holder: Penn Entertainment
- Website: hollywoodcasinotoledo.com

Hollywood Casino Toledo is a casino in Toledo, Ohio, that opened on May 29, 2012. The casino is owned by Gaming and Leisure Properties and operated by Penn Entertainment, and has 125,000 square feet (11,600 m^{2}) of gaming space, with 2,002 slot machines, 60 table games, and 20 poker tables.

== History ==
After four failed attempts since 1990 to legalize casinos in Ohio, a fifth proposal was placed on the ballot in 2009 to allow casinos at four specific sites, one in each of the state's largest cities. The major backers were Penn National Gaming (now Penn Entertainment), which would build the casinos in Toledo and Columbus, and Cleveland Cavaliers owner Dan Gilbert, who would develop the Cleveland and Cincinnati properties. Critics charged that Penn National did not truly intend to build the Toledo casino, which would face stiff competition from Detroit casinos, and only wanted to generate support from local voters. Nevertheless, the measure passed, with 53 percent support both in Lucas County and the state as a whole.

Days before the election, Penn National had struck a deal with Lakes Entertainment, a Minnesota-based gaming operator whose 2008 Ohio casino proposal Penn had fought hard to defeat. Lakes paid for 10 percent of the referendum campaign, and received an option to invest in up to 10 percent of the Toledo and Columbus casinos. Penn National bought out Lakes's interest in the projects for $25 million before construction began, after Lakes had paid $1.9 million.

After the measure passed, Penn National exercised its option to buy the 44-acre property on the Maumee River at Interstate 75, site of a former Pilkington glass plant, for $2.5 million. Construction began in August 2010.

In 2011, Governor John Kasich agreed to allow video lottery terminals at Ohio's seven racetracks, including Penn National's Raceway Park in Toledo. To avoid having its own racino compete with the Hollywood Casino, Penn sought state approval to move Raceway Park to the Youngstown area.

In 2015, Hollywoodcasino.com was introduced as the digital casino for all Hollywood properties.
