= Hollywood Gaming at Dayton Raceway =

Racino in Dayton, Ohio

Coordinates: 41.6581°N 83.5594°W

- Interactive map of Hollywood Gaming at Dayton Raceway
- Location: Dayton, Ohio; 777 Hollywood Boulevard
- Opened: August 28, 2014
- Gaming space: 186,000 sq ft (17,300 m^{2})
- Casino type: Racino
- Owner: Gaming and Leisure Properties
- Operating license holder: Penn Entertainment
Dayton Raceway
- Interactive map of Dayton Raceway
- Date opened: 1959
- Race type: Standardbred
- Course type: 5/8 mile oval
- Notable races: Dayton Pacing Derby

Hollywood Gaming at Dayton Raceway is a racino in Dayton, Ohio, United States. It was originally established in 1959 as Raceway Park in Toledo, Ohio, hosting car racing and thoroughbred racing. It is owned by Gaming and Leisure Properties and operated by Penn Entertainment.

== Racing ==
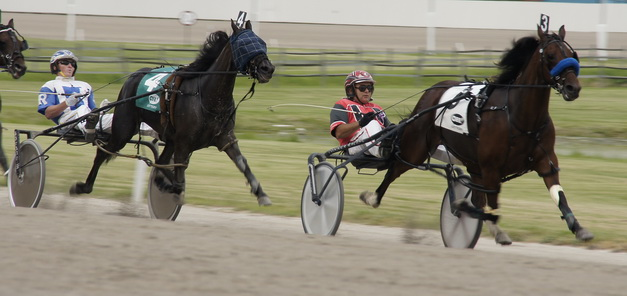
Standardbreds are featured in Harness Racing at Raceway Park in Toledo, Ohio

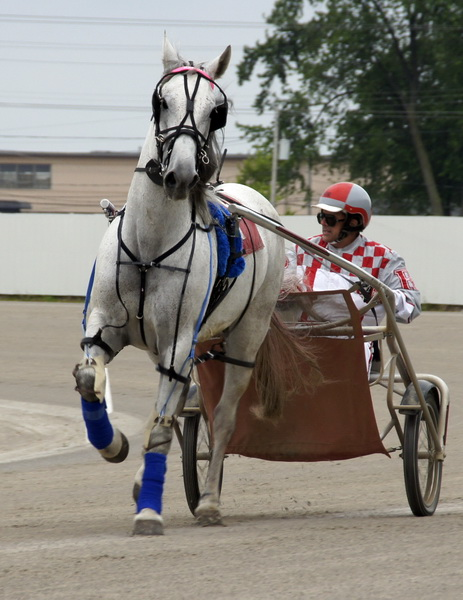
A Pacer warms up before racing at Raceway Park in Toledo, Ohio

Known for weekend live harness racing including Ohio Sire Stakes and Buckeye-Wolverine Pace. The Buckeye-Wolverine Pace took place every year until ending recently. The race once successfully predicted the outcome of the rival Ohio State-Michigan football game with 75% accuracy.

== Move to Dayton ==
In 2011, Governor John Kasich agreed to allow video lottery terminals at Ohio's seven racetracks. To avoid having Raceway Park compete with its own Hollywood Casino Toledo, Penn National sought and obtained state approval to move Raceway Park to Dayton. The racetrack move was completed in the spring of 2014. The racino opened on August 28, 2014 with 1,000 video lottery terminals.
