= Ted Binion kidnapping plot =

Kidnapping plot

The Ted Binion kidnapping plot was a 1967 plot in the United States to kidnap and kill Ted Binion, the son of casino operator Benny Binion. The plot was orchestrated by a taxi cab driver (Marvin Shumate) and another unnamed cab driver. The unnamed cab driver notified Ted Binion's father Benny Binion of the plot. Marvin Shumate was then killed by an unknown assailant.

== Background ==
In December 1967, Taxi cab driver Marvin Shumate, (a friend of Ted Binion) and another cab driver made plans to kidnap Ted Binion. The unnamed cab driver involved in the scheme went to Benny Binion and told him of the plot. The plot also involved killing Ted Binion and when Benny Binion was informed of the plot he did not take the information to the authorities.

== Murders ==
Shumate left work and was last seen at a bar in Las Vegas. Marvin Shumate was killed by an unknown assailant shortly after the plot was revealed. His body was found near Sunrise Mountain (Nevada) by a couple on December 2, 1967. Authorities determined that Shumate had been killed by a shotgun blast to the body and a .357 bullet to the head. Police suspected a mafia-ordered hit by a man named Tom Hanley. Hanley and his son Gramby were suspected in several mafia related restaurant firebombing cases, and they pleaded guilty to the murder of a chef. Authorities suspected the hit on Shumate was ordered by Ted's father Benny Binion. The Oakland Tribune reported that Shumate was badley beaten and the bullet in his head was from a .38 caliber handgun. The murder was thought to be the work of pros and the Las Vegas Sun described it as a gangland-type slaying. Authorities were not able to determine if the slaying of Marvin Weldon Shumate was related to the Binion case. In addition to the Binion kidnapping plot, Shumate was potentially involved with Hanley's other crimes. Shumate had a criminal record which included robbery, burglary and bootlegging.

In April 1969 Marvin Shumate's son Dennis was found dead of an overdose in a friend's apartment. Authorities initially suspected foul play and arrested two people and Dennis Shumate's 16 year old wife. But the authorities did not have enough evidence and they concluded that the overdose was self-inflicted.

When Tom Hanley was arrested on an unrelated charge, his bodyguard, Alphonse Bass told authorities that Hanley killed Shumate. Soon after his cooperation with authorities Bass was found murdered. Bass died in a house fire in North Las Vegas. The arson fire occurred March 30, 1968 and Tom Hanley was initially charged with the Bass murder. In 1969, the case against Hanley was dismissed due to a lack of evidence. The murders of Marvin Shumate and of Alphonse Bass were not solved.
