= Kevin Lepine =

American stage hypnotist and comedian

Kevin Lepine is an American stage hypnotist and comedian who is known for his Las Vegas comedy hypnosis show, Hypnosis Unleashed.

== Early life and education ==
Lepine was born in Detroit, Michigan area and graduated from East Detroit High School in 1993.

== Career ==
Lepine began his entertainment career performing comedy and hypnosis at local venues in Michigan, including Mark Ridley’s Comedy Castle. He later worked in New Orleans, Louisiana, before relocating to Las Vegas.

In 2010, Lepine moved to Las Vegas and became one of the hosts of Hypnosis Unleashed at the Harmon Theater. He later became the sole runner of the show. In 2012, he opened a new residency for Hypnosis Unleashed at the Hooters Casino Hotel. On December 10, 2013, the City of Las Vegas issued a proclamation declaring it “Kevin Lepine Day” to mark the show’s one-year anniversary at the venue. On the same day, he received certificates of recognition from U.S. Senator Dean Heller, Congressman Joe Heck, and the Governor of Nevada.

Following his residency at Hooters, Lepine moved Hypnosis Unleashed to downtown Las Vegas, first with a run at Binion’s Gambling Hall. In mid-2021, the show relocated to the Canyon Club theater inside the Four Queens Hotel and Casino, where it currently runs. His wife, Emily, performs as his onstage assistant. The show’s format is an adult-oriented comedy act that Lepine states is designed to be respectful of the onstage volunteers.

In 2023, Lepine published an autobiography, Deep Into My Eyes: From Victim to Vegas Headliner.

== Personal life ==
Kevin Lepine is married to Emily Lepine, his stage partner. They reside in Las Vegas.
