= Ted Binion =

American gambling executive (1943–1998)

- Born: Lonnie Theodore Binion; November 28, 1943; Dallas, Texas, U.S.
- Died: September 17, 1998 (aged 54); Las Vegas, Nevada, U.S.
- Known for: His collection known as the Binion Hoard, and his murder.
- Spouse: Doris Binion (m. 1980; div. 1995)
- Children: 2
- Parent: Benny Binion (father)
- Relatives: Jack Binion (brother)
- Conviction: Drug charge

Lonnie Theodore "Ted" Binion (November 28, 1943 – September 17, 1998) was an American gambling executive and the son of Las Vegas casino operator Benny Binion, owner of Binion's Horseshoe. Ted Binion was involved in multiple criminal activities, including associating with organized crime figures. He also possessed a multi-million dollar bullion coin and silver bar collection, known as the Binion Hoard, which he hid inside the Horseshoe and at two properties that he owned. When Binion died under suspicious circumstances in 1998, his girlfriend Sandra Murphy and her lover Rick Tabish were charged and convicted of burglary, grand larceny and murder. The pair were later granted a new trial and acquitted on the murder charges.

== Early life ==
Ted Binion was born in Dallas, Texas, on November 28, 1943. His father, Benny Binion, was a local organized crime figure who ran an illegal gambling operation in Dallas at the time of Ted's birth. Ted had an older brother, Jack Binion, who would later become the chairman of Wynn Resorts; and three sisters: Becky, Brenda and Barbara. After Benny moved his family to Las Vegas, Nevada, in 1946, Ted became involved in the operation of Binion's Horseshoe, a casino established by his father on Fremont Street.

While growing up, Ted spent summers at the Binion family's Montana retreat, a cattle ranch in Jordan, working with the ranch hands. Later, in the early 1960s, Benny sent his three grandsons — his daughter Barbara’s sons — to Montana to work on the ranch. According to the county recorder’s office, by the 1980s, Benny had expanded his holdings to 85,000 acres (340 km2), with the last parcel purchased in 1985. The Binion family sold all of the parcels to John Hillenbrand in April 1998.

In December 1967, Ted was the target of a kidnapping and murder plot allegedly masterminded by Marvin Weldon Schumate, a cab driver and petty criminal. Schumate disappeared on December 2, shortly after an unidentified co-conspirator allegedly divulged the scheme to Benny. Schumate's body, bearing signs of assault and a fatal gunshot wound to the head, was later discovered at the base of Sunrise Mountain on the east side of Las Vegas. Although the murder was never officially solved, authorities believed that Schumate was killed by mob hitman Tom Hanley at the behest of Benny Binion.

== Career ==
In 1964, Benny Binion regained full control of the Horseshoe after previously selling his interest to cover legal costs in defending himself on tax evasion charges. Because he had been convicted of murder in 1931, he was legally prohibited from obtaining a gaming license. His sons Jack and Ted — aged only 23 and 21, respectively — took over the day-to-day operation of the Horseshoe while Benny remained on the payroll, assuming the title of Director of Public Relations. Jack became president of the Horseshoe, while Ted became casino manager. For the next thirty years, Ted was often seen during the peak evening hours of the casino's operation and became known for hosting its poker tournaments.

By 1986, Ted Binion had been arrested on drug trafficking charges and begun drawing attention for his connection to organized crime figure Herbert "Fat Herbie" Blitzstein. Binion had begun engaging in substance abuse, to the point where dealers at the Horseshoe reportedly became aware of his presence due to the telltale odor of marijuana smoke whenever he was using an "eye in the sky" camera to monitor the casino floor. Binion had also started a relationship with Sandy Murphy, an exotic dancer, which resulted in his estranged wife and daughter leaving him. The Nevada Gaming Control Board (NGCB) suspected that Binion was using Murphy as a bagwoman.

In 1996, the NGCB provisionally banned Binion from any management role in the Horseshoe and ordered that he undergo regular drug testing. Binion struggled to avoid running afoul of the drug tests and, at one point, shaved off all of his body hair in an attempt to circumvent a hair test that would reveal his persistent usage. His gaming license was suspended in May 1997 after it was found that he had violated the drug testing agreement. Ten months later, after learning of Binion's association with Blitzstein, the NGCB voted unanimously to permanently revoke his license. The ruling, and the sale of the family's Montana ranch, caused Binion's drug abuse to escalate, especially with regard to marijuana, Xanax and the street drug tar heroin.

== Death and aftermath ==
On September 17, 1998, Binion was found dead on a small mattress on the floor of his home at 2408 Palomino Lane, near Rancho Drive and Charleston Boulevard. Empty pill bottles were found near the body, and an autopsy and toxicology report revealed that he had died of a combination of heroin and Xanax, with traces of Valium. On the day before his death, Binion had purchased twelve pieces of tar heroin from a drug dealer and had gotten a prescription for Xanax from his next-door neighbor, a doctor. Evidence introduced at trial showed that Binion personally took the prescription to a local pharmacy to be filled.

Binion's death was initially treated as a probable suicide. Sandy Murphy, his live-in girlfriend, claimed that he had been suicidal following the revocation of his gaming license several months earlier. Binion's sister Barbara, who suffered from similar drug problems, had committed suicide from an overdose in 1983, lending plausibility to the idea that he could have done the same. However, Binion's other sister Becky discounted any talk of suicide, claiming that Binion had not sounded dispondent in their conversations before his death.

Las Vegas homicide detectives suspected foul play in Binion's death, as his body did not show the typical signs of a drug overdose. While his stomach contained heroin, police thought that neither a heroin addict, nor someone attempting suicide, would take heroin in that manner. However, despite the urgings of Binion's siblings, law enforcement officials refused to open a full-scale investigation. Six months later, chief medical examiner Lary Simms ruled Binion had died of a heroin and Xanax overdose. A few weeks after that, however, the Clark County Coroner's office reclassified Ted's death a homicide. Law enforcement sources cited evidence that the death scene had been staged, as well as witness statements implicating Murphy and Tabish. Detectives had suspected for some time that the two had been romantically involved and learned that Binion suspected Murphy of infidelity.

In June 1999, Murphy and Tabish were arrested for Binion's murder, as well as for conspiracy, robbery, grand larceny and burglary. The prosecution contended that the pair had conspired to kill Binion and steal his wealth, drugging him into unconsciousness and burking him, a form of manual suffocation. The suffocation theory was presented at trial by forensics pathologist Michael Baden, who testified for the prosecution. Baden postulated that Murphy and Tabish had resorted to suffocation because their effort to kill Binion by drugging him had taken too long, fearing discovery. Both Murphy and Tabish were charged with murder as well as burglary for attempting to remove Binion's silver collection from its vault in Pahrump, Nevada.

A police report that was not used in the first trial by Tabish's first attorney, Louie Palazzo, revealed that there was a drive-by shooting at the front of Binion's home on June 5, 1997. Included in the police report was a statement by Binion alleging that Benny Behnen, the son of Ted's sister Becky, was among the shooters.

== Murder trial and re-trial ==
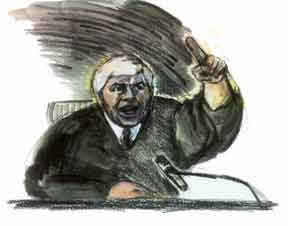
Judge Joseph Bonaventure, by courtroom artist Paulette Frankl.

The trial of Murphy and Tabish attracted national media attention. In May 2000, after two months of trial and after nearly 68 hours of deliberation, Murphy and Tabish were found guilty. Tabish was sentenced to 25 years to life in prison, while Murphy received 22 years to life. Later that year, David Roger, who prosecuted the case, was elected Clark County district attorney, and David Wall, who second-chaired the prosecution, was elected district judge.

However, in July 2003, the Nevada Supreme Court overturned the murder convictions, ruling that Clark County District Court Judge Joseph Bonaventure erred in deliberation instructions to the jury. The justices found that Tabish should have received a separate trial regarding a previous charge against him for assaulting and extorting businessman Leo Casey. While the prosecution was never able to prove a link between the previous charge against Tabish and the Binion murder charge, the justices ruled that testimony regarding the previous charge had prejudiced the jury against both Tabish and Murphy. The justices also ruled that jurors should have been instructed to consider statements by Binion's estate attorney as statements of the attorney's mind, not fact.

The defendants were granted a new trial, which began on October 11, 2004 in Judge Bonaventure's courtroom. This time, Murphy was represented by Michael Cristalli, while Tabish was represented by San Francisco attorney Tony Serra and local Las Vegas attorney Joseph Caramagno. Each was acquitted of murder, but both were convicted on lesser charges of burglary (12 to 60 months) and grand larceny (12 to 60 months). Tabish was also convicted for the use of a deadly weapon (18 to 60 months). Murphy was sentenced to time served and did not return to prison.

Tabish was originally sentenced to serve consecutive terms and was denied parole in 2001, 2004 and 2005. On January 26, 2009, he was brought into Las Vegas where the Nevada parole board granted him "Parole to Consecutive," meaning the three convictions were to run concurrently.

Tabish received another parole hearing in Las Vegas on January 13, 2010. The Nevada Board of Parole Commissioners announced January 26, 2010 that Tabish (then 44) would be granted parole. His younger brother described the news as "pretty wonderful".

Tabish was released on May 18, 2010. His parole started on April 2, 2010, but negotiating the terms of his release delayed his actual exit from prison.

== Buried treasure ==
Earlier in his career, inside the basement of the Horseshoe — housed in a floor-to-ceiling vault — Binion kept a currency collection later known as the Binion Hoard. The collection consisted of six tons of paper currency, silver bullion, casino chips and more than 100,000 rare coins, including Carson City silver dollars, many in mint condition. The rare coins alone were estimated to be worth between $7 million and $14 million. When his ties to the Horseshoe were severed, Binion was forced to move the collection off the property and was not allowed to be further associated with the casino.

After his death, Nye County sheriff's deputies discovered that Binion had had a 12-foot-deep vault built on the desert floor on a piece of property he owned in Pahrump, 60 miles (97 km) west of Las Vegas. The Pahrump underground vault would play a major role in the investigation into Binion's death.

After Binion was banned from the casino, he contracted the construction of the Pahrump underground vault with MRT Transport, a trucking company owned by Rick Tabish. An MRT tractor-trailer was used to transport the silver from the casino to the underground vault, and the only two people who had the combination to the vault were Binion and Tabish. The vault was secured three days after Binion's death when Nye County sheriff's deputies discovered that Tabish and two other men were attempting to unearth the silver using an excavator and dump truck.

Binion hid millions in and around his Las Vegas home, all of which went missing after his death. The riches are rumored to be buried on the property under odd mounds in the front and back yards. At the conclusion of the trial, much of Binion's silver was given to his daughter who had some of it offered for sale to the public. A large portion still remains unclaimed at the courthouse.

== Print and electronic media ==
The prosecution death theory, which the jury ultimately rejected, formed the basis for "Burked", a 2001 episode of the TV series CSI. The case was covered extensively in Death in the Desert, a biographical true crime book by author Cathy Scott. It was covered as well in Positively Fifth Street by James McManus, which is about a poker tournament at Binion's Horseshoe casino; and in An Early Grave by Gary C. King, which was released in 2001 as part of the "St. Martin's True Crime Classics" series. The case was also covered in the 2008 made-for-TV movie Sex and Lies in Sin City, said to be based on the book Murder in Sin City by columnist Jeff German that took the prosecution's point of view. However, the 2008 made-for-TV movie storyline was changed to allow for other theories about Binion's death. Las Vegas columnist John L. Smith published a pictorial summary of the case titled Quicksilver.

The cable TV network A&E aired an hour-long video about the case titled Who Wants to Kill a Millionaire, which is part of its "American Justice" series, and includes interviews and film clips of the characters surrounding Binion's death and aftermath.

The second edition of Death in the Desert, released in 2012, covers the re-trial and acquittals. An Early Grave's re-release in 2005 includes appendices about the re-trial and acquittals. Coverage can also be found at trutv.com under "Ted Binion", and in the 48 Hours Mystery episode "Buried Secrets of Las Vegas."

The TV show On the Case covered the case in its episode #12 which aired in 2009. It includes interviews with Sandra Murphy and footage of her lawyer Tony Serra during the second trial.

The seventh episode of the CBS legal comedy-drama The Defenders, titled "Las Vegas v. Johnson" is a loosely depicted version of the trial.

== See also ==
- List of coin collectors
