= Hotel Apache =

Hotel in Las Vegas, Nevada, US

Coordinates: 36.17160°N 115.14425°W

- Interactive map of Hotel Apache
- Location: Las Vegas, Nevada 89101; 128 E. Fremont Street
- Opened: March 19, 1932; 94 years ago
- No. of rooms: 81
- Casino type: Land-Based
- Owner: TLC Casino Enterprises
- Website: www.binions.com/hotel/index.php

Hotel Apache is the hotel located at Binion's Gambling Hall and Hotel on Fremont Street in Downtown Las Vegas, Nevada. The hotel was bought by Benny Binion in 1951 and was merged with the Eldorado Club into Binion's Horseshoe. TLC Casino Enterprises, the current owner of Binion's Gambling Hall and Hotel, planned to reopen 81 of the rooms as a boutique hotel, going back to the roots of the original hotel name. It opened in the summer 2019.

It is known for having the first elevator and is the first fully carpeted casino in Las Vegas.

On December 14, 2009, the hotel and coffee shop closed due to the late-2000s recession. Previously, Binion's advertised the hotel as closed for renovations. However, due to the high cost of asbestos removal in the hotel, renovation plans were shelved.

The hotel reopened on July 29, 2019. One of the first guests was Gina Silvagni Perry, the granddaughter of the man who constructed the casino. According to Tim Lager, general manager of Binion’s, he wanted to "recreate what this hotel was when it opened as what was then a megaresort back in 1932". TLC Casino Enterprises currently manages and operates the casino.
