= Jeff German =

American journalist (1953–2022)

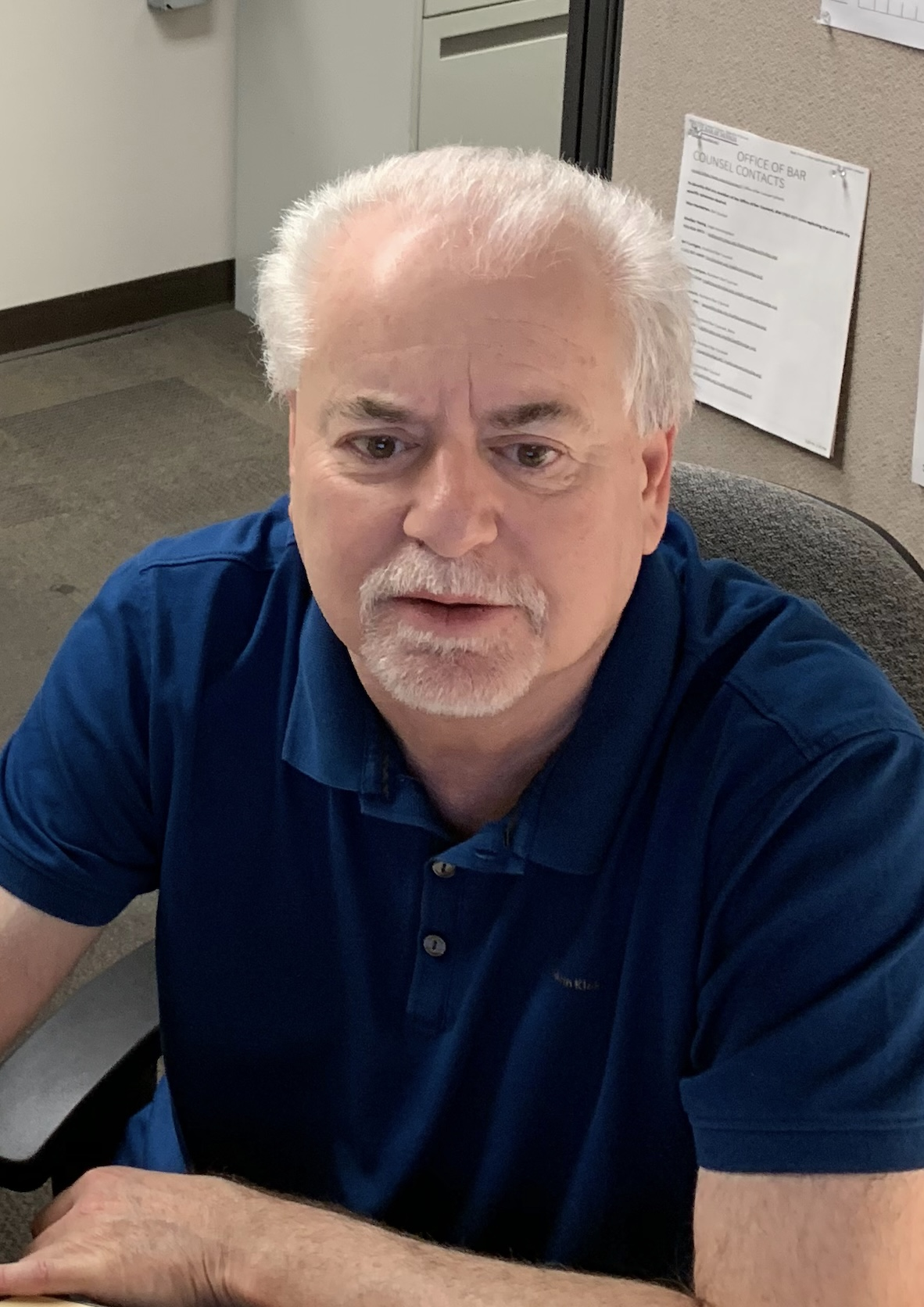
- Jeff German working in the Las Vegas Review-Journal offices on Oct. 20, 2018
- Born: Jeffrey Michael German; August 23, 1953; Milwaukee, Wisconsin, U.S.
- Died: September 2, 2022 (aged 69); Las Vegas Valley, Nevada, U.S.
- Cause of death: Murder by stabbing
- Education: Marquette University (MA)
- Occupations: Journalist; podcaster; author
- Employers: Las Vegas Review-Journal; Las Vegas Sun

Jeffrey Michael German (August 23, 1953 – September 2, 2022) was an American investigative reporter who wrote for the Las Vegas Review-Journal and the Las Vegas Sun, his career spanning four decades. He was murdered in 2022 by Robert Telles, an elected Clark County, Nevada Public Administrator, whom German had investigated and reported on.

== Early life and education ==
German was born to Jewish parents Max and June German (née Kaplan) in Milwaukee, Wisconsin. He earned a master's degree from Marquette University. He began his journalistic career as an intern for the Milwaukee Journal Sentinel. He also worked with Jim Romenesko.

== Career ==
German was a columnist and investigative reporter at the Las Vegas Sun for more than two decades, covering organized crime, government, politics, and courts. He covered the MGM Grand fire in 1980 and the early 2000s FBI investigation into bribes taken by Clark County commissioners (Operation G-Sting). With fellow reporter Cathy Scott, he broke the story of the 1997 murder of mafia associate bookmaker Herbert Blitzstein.

In 2001, German wrote the true crime book Murder in Sin City: The Death of a Las Vegas Casino Boss, which told the story of the death of Ted Binion, heir to the Binion's Horseshoe fortune. His book also covered the theft of Binion's silver, known as the Binion Hoard.

German was a writer and host for the podcast series Mobbed Up: The Fight for Las Vegas, which was co-produced with the Mob Museum.

After being laid off by the Las Vegas Sun in 2009, German joined the Las Vegas Review-Journal newspaper staff in 2010.

In the aftermath of the 2017 Las Vegas mass shooting, German was the first to report that the shooter had initially fired at two nearby jet fuel tanks at the Las Vegas airport before turning his attention to the music festival site. He also reported on failures in the city's inspections ahead of the fatal 2019 Alpine Motel Apartments fire and investigated mismanagement, unlawful misconduct, and bullying in the office of the Clark County Public Administrator, Robert Telles.

== Murder ==
German was found stabbed to death outside his Las Vegas Valley home on September 3, 2022. He was 69 years old. The police reported that he had been involved in an altercation with somebody outside his house the day before he was found dead and that they had identified a suspect for his murder. The suspect had worn an orange jacket, straw hat and Nike sneakers.

On September 7, police arrested Clark County Public Administrator Robert Telles on suspicion of German's murder after DNA matching Telles was found in the crime scene. Telles had lost his re-election bid in the Democratic primary after German published the results of an investigation that found Telles was contributing to a hostile work environment and having an inappropriate relationship with a staffer. In an August 2024 jury trial, Telles was convicted of German's murder. On August 28, 2024, he was sentenced to life with the possibility of parole after 20 years. On October 16, 2024, he was sentenced to an additional 8 to 20 years on enhancements for using a knife and German being over 60 years old at the time of his murder.

The killing of Jeff German was condemned by the Director-General of UNESCO Audrey Azoulay in a press-release published on September 9, 2022. UNESCO's mandate to "promote the free flow of ideas by word and image" includes the protection of journalists and media workers against any forms of attacks and reprisals related to their duties. German's death is included on UNESCO's Observatory of Killed Journalists.

Investigative Reporters & Editors condemned his "senseless death" as well, stating, "Jeff’s death is a sobering reminder of the inherent risks of investigative journalism,” said Diana Fuentes, IRE's executive director. “Journalists do their jobs every day, digging deep to find information the public needs to know and has a right to see.”

German's death marked the ninth U.S. journalist in 30 years to be murdered in connection with their work.

Arthur Kane, a Las Vegas Review-Journal co-worker of German, wrote a book about the murder, titled The Last Story: The Murder of an Investigative Journalist in Las Vegas, released by WildBlue Press in 2024.

== Personal life ==
German was a bachelor, and lived alone. His sister is married to editorial cartoonist Mike Smith.

== Portrayals in television ==
In the CBS crime documentary 48 Hours narrated by Peter Van Sant, German's killing and the coverage of security footage of suspect Robert Telles and his subsequent arrest are examined in "The Assassination of Jeff German" in 2024.
