= Sunrise Mountain =

Sunrise Mountain may refer to:

- Sunrise Mountain (Nevada), a peak on the east side of the Las Vegas Valley
- Sunrise Mountain, part of the Kittatinny Mountain ridge in New Jersey
- Sunrise Mountain, part of the Killington Ski Resort in Vermont
