= Binion Hoard =

American silver dollar hoard

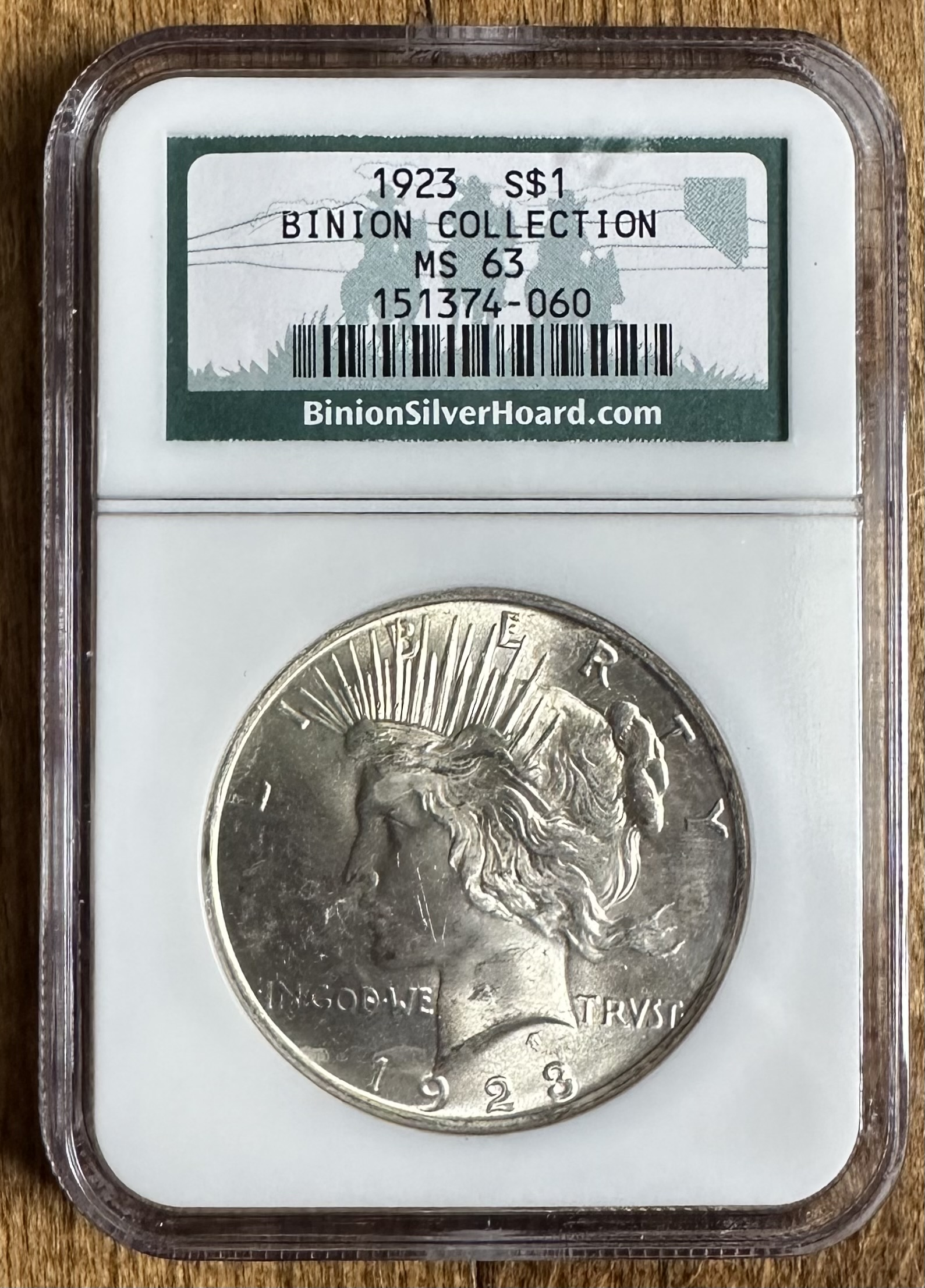
NGC-certified Peace dollar from the Binion Hoard

The Binion Hoard was American gambling executive Ted Binion's collection of silver and silver dollars. Binion had a safe installed 12 ft (3.7 m) deep in the ground of a vacant lot that he owned in Pahrump, Nevada, United States. In the safe he stored his 46,000 pounds (21,000 kg) of silver, including 135,000 silver dollars. In 1998, Binion died of an overdose and authorities determined that he had been murdered. Two days after his death Richard Tabish and four other people were arrested for digging up the buried silver.

After an investigation into Binion's death, his girlfriend Sandy Murphy and her purported lover Richard Tabish were arrested and convicted of his murder: they were also charged in the theft of his silver. Four other people were also arrested and charged with grand larceny and burglary for helping Richard Tabish enter the safe and take the silver from Binion's property. The murder convictions of Murphy and Tabish were overturned by the Nevada Supreme Court in 2003, and a new trial in 2004 resulted in their acquittals on the murder charge. All six were subsequently convicted of grand larceny and burglary for taking the silver.

In 2001 the Ted Binion estate sold the silver coins. Spectrum Numismatic International purchased the entire collection of silver dollars for US$3.3 million (equivalent to $6,518,477 in 2025). The coins were certified and sealed in coin slabs by the Numismatic Guaranty Company (NGC). Spectrum Numismatic International priced individual coins from the hoard between US$50 and US$10,000.

== Background ==
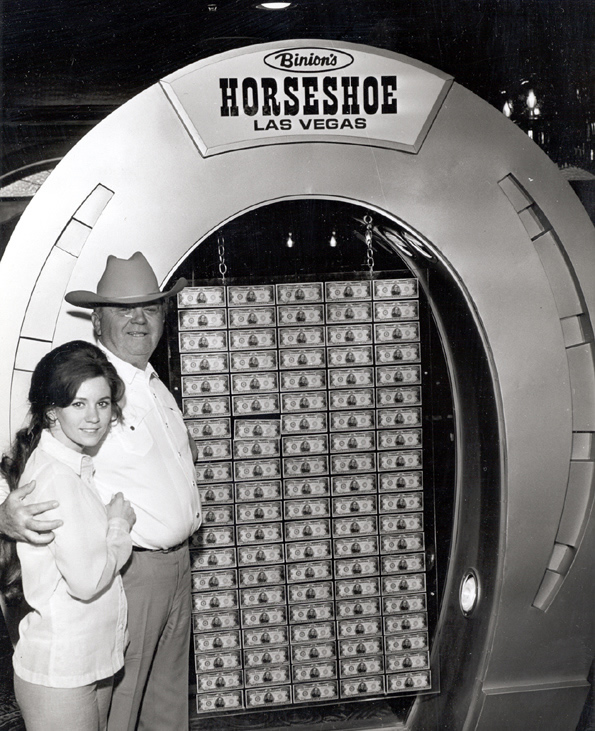
Benny Binion with his daughter Becky (eventual owner of Binion's Horseshoe) in front of the famous $1 million display (c. 1969)

In 1951, Benny Binion opened a casino on Fremont Street in Las Vegas, which he named Binion's Horseshoe. In the 1950s, he was convicted for tax evasion. To finance his legal defense, he had to sell his majority interest in the casino. As a result of his conviction, he was prohibited from holding a gaming license. Benny Binion's five children took over his share of the casino. In 1964 the family reacquired the majority stake in the casino, and Ted Binion assumed the role of manager.

Ted Binion rebranded the casino Binion's Gambling Hall and Hotel. In the casino vaults he stored his hoard of silver. He was a long time user of illicit drugs; for many years, he was known to smoke tar heroin and take the anti-anxiety medication Xanax. Binion's gaming license was suspended several times over an 11-year period because of his drug use. He was also known to associate with mafia figures. Binion was also a collector of silver, silver coins and guns.

In 1997, the Nevada Gaming Control Board gave Ted Binion a one year license suspension after he failed a drug test. One year later, in 1998, the Nevada Gaming Commission revoked Binion's license. They cited his ties to a murdered underworld figure named Herbert Blitzstein as the reason. Binion and Blitzstein were seen at adult nightclubs. Binion also gave Blitzstein a gold watch. The Gaming Commission voted 4–0 in favour of stripping Binion's license. After Binion lost his gaming license, he sold his share of the casino to his sister Becky Behnen. The license ban was permanent, and Ted Binion made plans to move his silver from the casino vaults.

He did not know where to store the silver, so he first had it moved to the garage at his home. His attorney attempted to find a place to store the silver properly but was unsuccessful. Binion came up with the idea to bury the silver on an empty lot he owned in Pahrump, along the main highway. In April of 1998, Binion had an underground vault buried on the lot approximately 12 ft (3.7 m) deep. In July 1998, just two months before his death, Ted Binion hired Richard Tabish to move the silver. Binion hired Tabish because he was a trucking contractor. William Alder was one of the men who helped move the hoard out of the casino. Alder stated that Ted Binion supervised the operation in which two hundred carts of silver were moved from the casino. He stated that they began moving the silver at 1:00 a.m and did not finish until 6:00 a.m. The silver covered the floor of a trailer and measured 25 ft (7.6 m) x 8 ft (2.4 m); it was approximately 3 ft (0.91 m) or more deep. Ted Binion's lawyer Richard Wright said Binion chose the empty lot along a busy highway because he thought anyone digging in such a busy location would attract attention. The hoard was said to weigh 46,000 pounds (21,000 kg) and have a value of US$4M (equivalent to $8,000,000 in 2025). Cathy Scott, an investigative journalist who wrote Death in the Desert: The Ted Binion Homicide Case, stated in an interview: "I think he didn't trust banks or he was filing money from the IRS and so he put it in mattresses, buried it in the backyard, as did his father."

== History ==
=== Ted Binion's death ===
Ted Binion was found dead lying on the floor face up in his home in Las Vegas on September 17, 1998. Authorities determined that he had died from a lethal cocktail of drugs, composed of Xanax and heroin. On September 23, 1998, the Los Angeles Times reported that the police did not initially see a connection between the death of Ted Binion and the theft of the silver and they did not suspect murder. Ken Hefner from the Las Vegas Metropolitan Police Department homicide unit stated that Binion did not die violently and he appeared to have died of an overdose. The Times also reported on speculation that Binion's girlfriend was romantically linked to one of the suspects in the theft of the silver.

In 1999, Ted Binion's brother Jack Binion offered a reward of US$100,000 (equivalent to $198,000 in 2025) to find Ted Binion's killer. Binion's friends suspected he had been murdered, but five months after Binion's death, there had still been no arrests. A Clark County prosecutor stated that he was "looking at one or more individuals for their possible involvement in [Binion's] death." According to authorities, Binion was force-fed heroin and anti-anxiety pills. Both his ex-wife and his drug dealer stated that he exclusively smoked heroin and did not take it orally.

=== Arrests and convictions ===
Police were able to connect Binion's girlfriend, a former topless dancer named Sandy Murphy, to the theft of the silver. She was arrested on charges of stealing Binion's buried treasure. The police were able to link her romantically to Richard Tabish, who had been previously arrested for stealing the silver. Tabish, a trucking contractor and a convicted felon, became a suspect when he was seen by a sheriff's deputy removing the treasure from an in-ground safe on Binion's lot in Pahrump just two days after his death. In the early morning hours on September 19, 1998, Nye County sheriff's deputies discovered Tabish and other men digging in the vacant lot where Binion had buried his silver and when questioned Tabish said that Binion asked him to get the silver, in the event of his death, and give it to his daughter. He and three others were arrested at 3am that same day.

The Washington Post reported that the day before Binion died, his physician, Enrique LaCoya, gave Binion a prescription for the drug Xanax. On the evening of the 16th, a drug dealer told investigators that he had sold Binion heroin in the past; he reported that Binion purchased twelve balloons filled with tar heroin. The dealer stated that Binion always smoked the drug, and never ingested it because of the bitter taste of tar heroin. That same day, Binion reportedly told his lawyer Jim Brown "Take Sandy out of the will, if she doesn't kill me tonight. If I am dead, you will know what happened."

On June 24, 1999, Sandy Murphy and Richard Tabish were arrested and charged with the murder of Ted Binion. The two were arrested at a grocery store in Henderson, Nevada. The two were transported to the Clark County Detention Center in Las Vegas, where they were held without bail. The four men who assisted Richard Tabish in removing the silver were arrested the same day.

In May 2000, Murphy and Tabish were convicted of Binion's murder and sentenced to life in prison. In October 2000, four other men were convicted of grand larceny for helping Tabish dig up the treasure. In all, six people were convicted for the theft of the Binion hoard. Ted Binion added Murphy to his will two months before his death; the will awarded Murphy his home, which was valued at US$900,000, its contents, and US$300,000. After Murphy's conviction for Binion's murder, Nevada state law did not allow her to inherit any part of his estate.

=== Murder case retrial ===
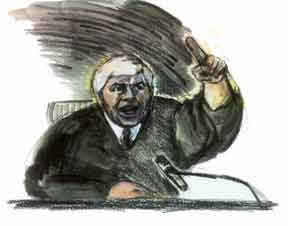
Artist rendering of Clark County District Judge Joseph Bonaventure during the retrial of Tabish and Murphy

In 2002, the Murphy and Tabish lawyers petitioned the Nevada Supreme Court for a retrial. The court considered the petition for more than six months. To work on the appeal, Murphy hired legal professor Alan Dershowitz and Tabish hired attorney Tony Serra. In 2003, the Nevada Supreme Court overturned the murder convictions of Murphy and Tabish and granted them a new trial. The retrial lasted six weeks. Cellphone records were presented by the prosecution in the retrial. The records revealed that Tabish spoke with Murphy three times while he was in the desert retrieving the silver. In the first trial, the evidence presented by the prosecution's medical expert Michael Baden helped convict Murphy and Tabish. Baden, a pathologist, testified in court that Binion was "burked" (suffocated) from someone covering his mouth and placing their weight on his chest. He also testified that the drugs ingested by Binion were not enough to kill him. A local medical examiner who testified for the prosecution gave a different account, stating that Binion died of a "forced overdose". In the retrial, the defense called a number of expert witnesses which the Associated Press referred to as "an army of forensic pathologists, toxicologists and dermatologists to contradict Baden's theory".

In their 2004 retrial, the case was heard by Clark County District Judge Joseph Bonaventure. The jury was made up of seven men and five women. After hearing the case, they deliberated for four days before returning a verdict. Murphy and Tabish were acquitted of murder—but their convictions for larceny and burglary were not overturned. Murphy was released shortly after her acquittal on the murder charge, but Tabish remained in prison. Tabish was released from prison in 2010, after which he began working in the field of cryptocurrency mining as the president of FX Solutions in Montana. As of 2018, Murphy and her husband were owners of an art gallery in Laguna Beach, California.

=== Sale of the hoard ===
In July of 2000, the Las Vegas Sun reported that some of Ted Binion's rare coins with a Carson City Mint mark were presumed stolen after his death. Chief Deputy District Attorney David Roger estimated that the missing coins were worth between US$10 and $15 million. Only one Carson City marked coin was found in the hoard of 135,000 silver dollars. Ted Binion's estate also said that an unknown number of double eagle $20 gold pieces, a collection of antique coins and currency from the Civil War era were also missing.

The silver from the hoard was evidence in the criminal proceedings. While the trial was proceeding through the courts, Judge Joseph Bonaventure did not allow the estate of Ted Binion to sell the silver. The estate had to wait to sell the hoard until after the penalty hearing in the convictions which took place May 23, 2000. In July of 2000, the Binion estate was moving to sell the silver and other assets. The 38-acre (15 ha) vacant lot where Ted Binion kept the hoard was sold to two casino executives for US$6.5 million. The estate also began accepting sealed bids for the silver hoard. The proceeds of asset sales were to be placed in a trust for Ted Binion's nineteen year old daughter. In October of 2001, Ted Binion's estate sold the silver coins to Spectrum Numismatics International for US$3.3 million (equivalent to $6,500,000 in 2025). Approximately 50,000 silver coins were uncirculated, and some of the coins remained in the original mint bags. In 2002, the coins were marketed by the company for between US$50 and US$10,000. The coins were certified in coin slabs by the Numismatic Guaranty Company (NGC). According to NGC, there were 100,000 high quality US silver dollars in the collection. Coin retailer Goldline International was selected to market the coins.

== Legacy ==
In 2001, Jeff German, (investigative reporter for the Las Vegas Sun) wrote a book about Ted Binion's death and the theft of his silver titled: Murder in Sin City: The Death of a Las Vegas Casino Boss. In 2002, Spectrum Numismatics International offered the coins for sale; they reported brisk sales. The coins were sold for a premium beyond their base value, due to the sensational story of the Binion hoard.

In 2019 three men were caught on camera digging holes on a property in Pahrump, Nevada, once owned by Binion. The property manager was able to identify one of the people from the security video. The person who was identified had been previously accused of trespassing on the property in 2017. When deputies made contact with the man in 2017 he stated that there were millions of dollars in gold buried there. Many people, including investigative journalist Cathy Scott, believe that there is more buried treasure on Binion's property. In 2022, a local Las Vegas news station reported that Binion's land had sold for $1.9 million. They stated that although the land had been repeatedly searched and no treasure was found, many people nonetheless believed there is more silver to be found. In 2022 Dateline NBC aired an episode about the Ted Binion case titled: "What Happened in Vegas".
