= Blitzstein =

Blitzstein (German: "lightning stone") is an Ashkenazi surname. Notable people with the surname include:

- Herbert Blitzstein (1934–1997), American loanshark, bookmaker, and racketeer
- Marc Blitzstein (1905–1964), American composer, lyricist, and librettist
