= Jack Binion =

American businessman (born 1937)

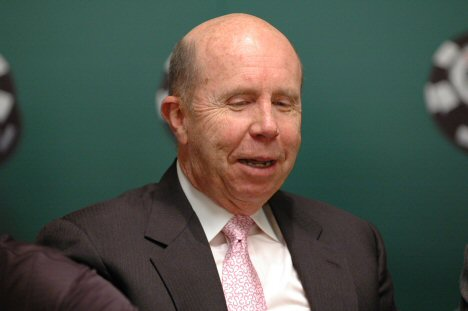
- Born: 1937 (age 88–89)
- Years active: 1963–present
- Employer: Wynn Resorts
- Known for: Binion's Horseshoe
- Parent: Benny Binion
- Relatives: Ted Binion (brother)

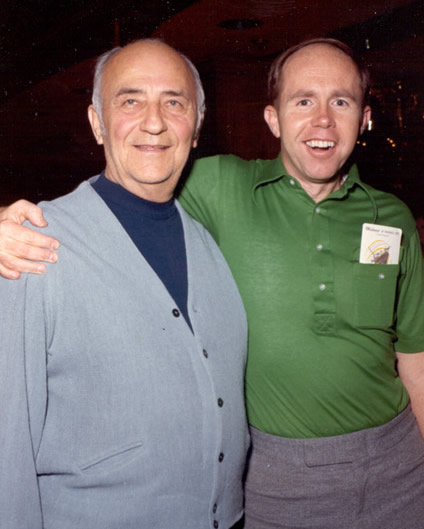
Johnny Moss and Jack Binion.

Jack Binion (born 1937) is an American businessman and was chairman of Wynn Resorts (2006–2018). He is the son of casino magnate Benny Binion. Jack worked for his father at Binion's Horseshoe, a casino and hotel in Las Vegas, Nevada.

== Biography ==
Binion became president of the Horseshoe casino in 1963 at the age of 26. His father had been convicted of tax evasion in 1953, and could no longer hold a gaming license. When the Binions regained full control of the casino in 1964, Jack was the nominal licensee.

His stature within the organization grew following the Horseshoe's 1970 hosting of the first World Series of Poker, which would become the largest poker tournament in the world. Privately held, Binion's Horseshoe was one of Nevada's most successful casino operations.

In 1989, following the death of Benny Binion, there was a protracted legal battle for control of the casino among the heirs. Jack Binion, as one of the heirs, sold his interest in Binion's Horseshoe to his sister, Becky Behnen, while retaining a token 1% interest in the operation so that he could lawfully retain his Nevada Gaming License. He also acquired the rights to the Horseshoe brand outside of the state of Nevada.

Binion went on to form Horseshoe Gaming Holding Corporation, which developed and operated several riverboat casinos under the Horseshoe name. Binion continued to promote the casinos for Harrah's Entertainment following his sale of the company in 2004 to Harrah's. As of 2008, Binion's name appears on the "Jack Binion's Steakhouse" at Horseshoe Tunica and Horseshoe Hammond and several of the Horseshoe-branded casinos still carry slot machines bearing Binion's likeness called "Who Wants To Be A Binionaire?", which originated before the Harrah's acquisition.

While running Horseshoe Gaming, Binion started the World Poker Open, which at one time was a major feeder tournament for the World Series of Poker.

Binion was inducted into the American Gaming Association's Gaming Hall of Fame on June 11, 2004. The following year on July 6, 2005, the World Series of Poker, inducted him into the Poker Hall of Fame.

In July 2006, Binion became chairman of Wynn Resorts. His responsibilities included opening the Wynn Macau. He has since resigned from the position but has remained with Wynn Resorts in a consulting role.
