= Saban Theatre =

Historic theatre in Beverly Hills, California

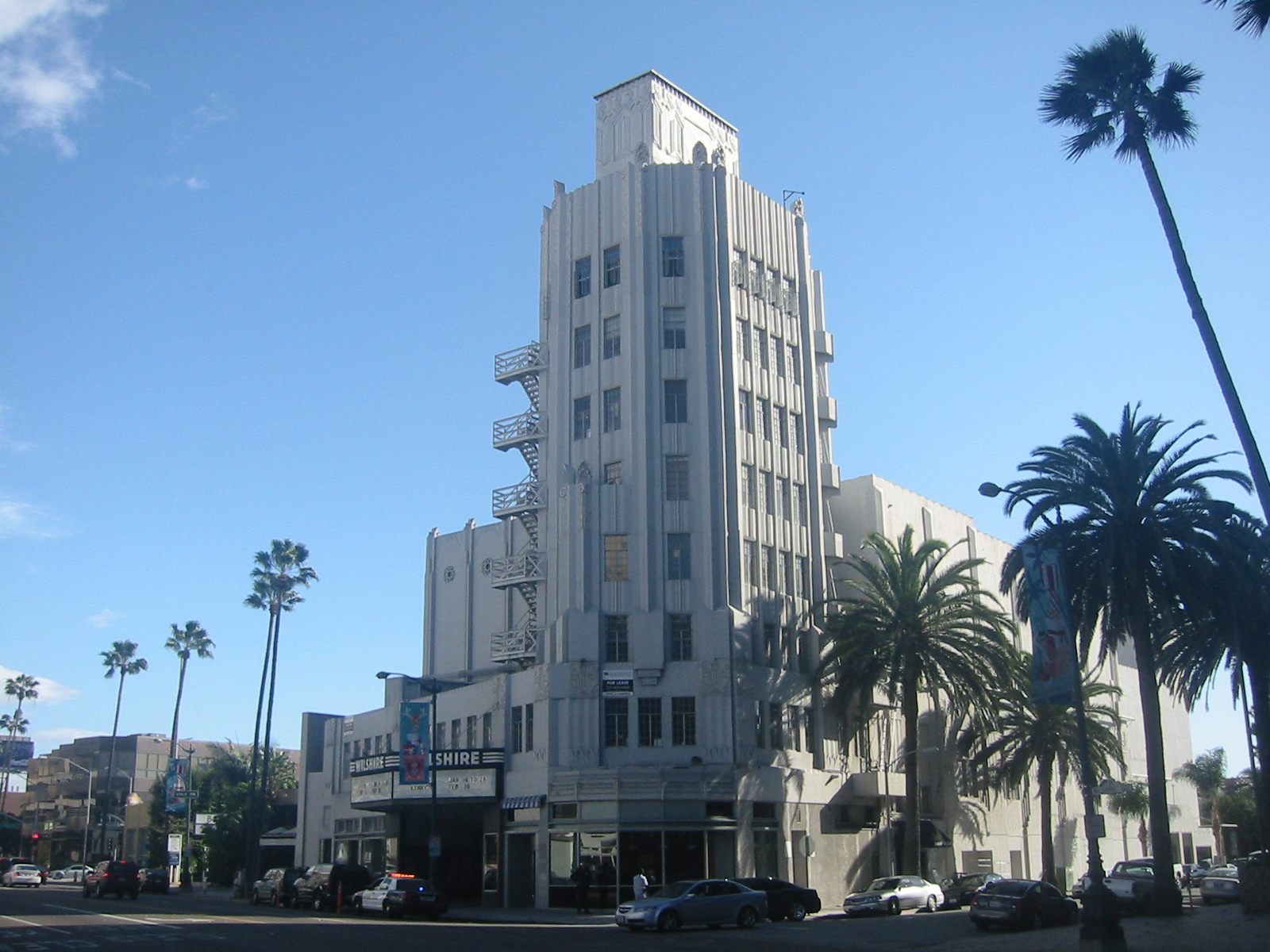
- Saban Theatre, 2006
- Interactive map of Saban Theatre
- Former names: Fox Wilshire Theatre; Wilshire Theatre Beverly Hills
- Address: 8440 Wilshire Boulevard; Beverly Hills, California; United States
- Owner: Temple of the Arts
- Capacity: 2,000
- Current use: Live entertainment venue

Construction
- Opened: September 19, 1930
- Reopened: 1981
- Architect: S. Charles Lee

Website
- sabantheatre.org
- Fox Wilshire Theatre
- U.S. National Register of Historic Places
- Coordinates: 34°3′53″N 118°22′30″W
- Area: 0.6 acres (0.24 ha)
- Architectural style: Art Deco
- NRHP reference No.: 12000164
- Added to NRHP: April 3, 2012

The Saban Theatre ( /səˈbɑːn/ sə-BAHN) is a historic theatre in Beverly Hills, California, formerly known as the Fox Wilshire Theater. It is an Art Deco structure at the southeast corner of Wilshire Boulevard and Hamilton Drive designed by architect S. Charles Lee and is considered a classic Los Angeles landmark. The building was listed on the National Register of Historic Places on April 3, 2012.

== History ==
The Saban Theatre has been both a significant cultural and architectural landmark for Los Angeles and Beverly Hills since its opening as the Fox Wilshire Theatre on September 19, 1930. It was originally designed with 2500 seats by noted theatre architect S. Charles Lee to be a major film presentation house, even including a stage for Vaudeville acts before the films.

Over its 91-year history, the Saban has been the site of numerous film premieres, exclusive first-run film engagements, live concerts and touring Broadway shows. Despite several renovations, the interior remains mostly intact with its columned two-story rotunda lobby, spacious orchestra and balcony level seating for 2,000, and its silver, gold and black proscenium and organ screens. The connection with architect S. Charles Lee, a long-time resident of the city of Beverly Hills, makes the Saban significant also as an example of Lee's transition from the French Regency style of the Tower Theatre and other Los Angeles Theatres to the nascent Art Deco style that would come to dominate movie palace architecture in the 1930s.

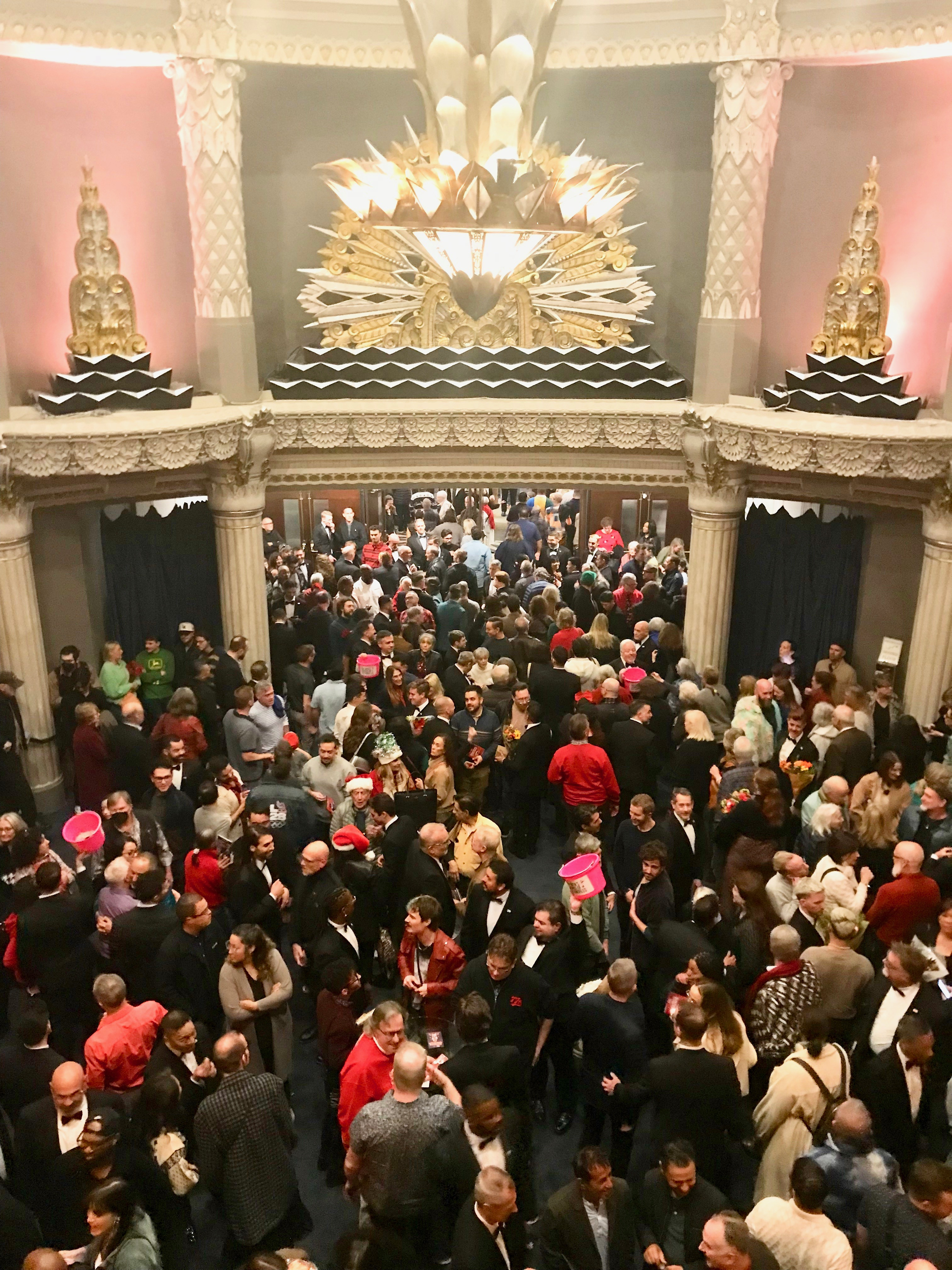
Inside the Saban Theatre for the Gay Men's Chorus of Los Angeles's Sugar Plum Fairies holiday show, Dec. 2024.

Opened as the Fox Wilshire Theatre, it was one of 20th Century Fox's premiere theaters for several decades, serving as a movie palace until a 1981 renovation converted it into a stage venue. It was operated by the Nederlander Organization from 1981 to 1989. The Saban Theater is now regularly used as a live performance venue for comedy, music, television, film shoots, screenings, and community intercultural events such as PaleyFest. Temple of the Arts has owned and operated the theatre since 2005. Sterling Venue Ventures, led by Lance Sterling currently produces over 50 concerts and events at the Saban per year. Notable performers Sterling has brought to the theatre include Marillion, Paul Anka, Burt Bacharach, Frankie Valli, Styx, George Thorogood, Kenny Loggins, Todd Rundgren, and Morris Day.

=== Renaming ===
In March 2009, owners announced that the Wilshire would be renamed the Saban Theatre in recognition of a $5 million grant from Haim and Cheryl Saban. The funds have been used to further restoration efforts on the orchestra, proscenium and marquee. It also houses programs by Temple of the Arts, which aims to integrate the arts and Judaism.

=== Preservation and restoration ===
Beverly Hills Performing Arts Center (BHPAC) led the movement to have the city of Beverly Hills create a Historic Preservation Ordinance passing the Mills Act, which supports historic theatres. BHPAC secured placement of the venue on The Federal and State Registry of Historic Places and designation of the theatre as a Beverly Hills landmark.

BHPAC'S mission was summarized as "Awakening a Sleeping Beauty," engaging design firm Evergreene Architectural Arts, which specializes in historic theatre restoration. Past evergreen projects include Radio City Music Hall, The Metropolitan Opera, Broadway's New Amsterdam Theatre, Hollywood's Pantages and Santa Barbara's Granada Theatre. They guided the restoration of the theatre orchestra and proscenium with the help of the archives of renowned theatre architect S. Charles Lee at the UCLA School of Architecture.

=== Modernization ===
In conjunction with Sterling Venue Ventures LLC, management began an extensive update of the stage, lighting, and sound systems so that performances of Broadway shows and live concerts could be enhanced. State of the art robotic cameras were also installed to capture live performance in high quality. Sterling Venue Ventures, in addition to updating the space, has also added special private event functionality to the venue to accommodate all types of special events up to 1,800 people.

=== The Steve Tisch Cinema Center ===
To reawaken the storied film history of the theatre, philanthropist film producer Steve Tisch gifted the naming rights for the Steve Tisch Cinema Center. This endowment enabled the installation of a state of the art film projection system as the theatre continues to host opening nights for major film festivals and special screenings.

== Notable events ==
Notable events include:

- The African Queen starring Humphrey Bogart and Katharine Hepburn (December 26, 1951)
- How to Marry a Millionaire starring Marilyn Monroe and Lauren Bacall (November 1953)
- 12 Angry Men starring Henry Fonda, Lee J. Cobb and Ed Begley (April 10, 1957)
- Sleeping Beauty starring Mary Costa and Bill Shirley (January 1959)
- Stevie Nicks's "White Winged Dove" tour (1981), filmed for an HBO special
- Los Angeles premiere of Paramount Pictures's Dreamgirls (December 11, 2006)
- Taping of the Season 1 finale episode "Journey" of the TV series Glee
- Comedy Central Roast of Alec Baldwin (September 15, 2019)

Since Sterling Venue Ventures took over management, the Saban has become a dominant force on the LA music scene. Notable events include:

- 'LA Comics Support Their Own' a special event featuring Ray Romano, Brian Regan, Bill Burr, and Bob Saget amongst many other Los Angeles-based comics.
- The 26th Annual NAACP Theatre Awards
- Star-Studded Tribute to Eddie Money with Sammy Hagar, George Thorogood, Kevin Cronin, James Hetfield, John Waite and more / February 20, 2020
- REO Speedwagon / February 4, 2020
- Styx / January 12, 2020 and January 19, 2019, and January 28, 2018
- Pat Benatar & Neil Giraldo / October 19, 2019
- David Crosby & Friends / September 10, 2019
- Art Garfunkel / May 9, 2019
- Little Steven & The Disciples of Soul with a special guest appearance by Bruce Springsteen / May 4, 2019
- Rick Springfield Accompanied by a Symphony Orchestra / March 30, 2019
- Frankie Valli & The Four Seasons February 28 and March 1, 2019
- Paul Anka / February 2, 2019 and January 14, 2018
- Todd Rundgren / December 31, 2017
- Asia / GRAVITAS Tour (final North American /ASIA\ tour with founding vocalist / bass guitarist John Wetton) / October 18, 2014

== Starlet disappearance ==
In May 1944, thirteen-year-old Patsy Ruth Brown disappeared after leaving producer Jack Schwarz's Fox Wilshire Building penthouse. Schwarz told juvenile officers that Patsy had spent the afternoon in his apartment. That evening he gave her three dollars for a taxi. According to Schwarz, Patsy left in the company of an older girl named O'Hara, whom Patsy had brought with her. Schwarz said that Patsy had begged him numerous times for a role in one of his films. Her only film appearance (uncredited) was in Nearly Eighteen (1943). A taxi driver who took Patsy to Union Station told the police that Patsy said she was going to San Bernardino to visit her father, an employee of a Barstow, California rock company. However, the taxi driver's tip failed to help police trace the missing girl.

== Photo gallery ==
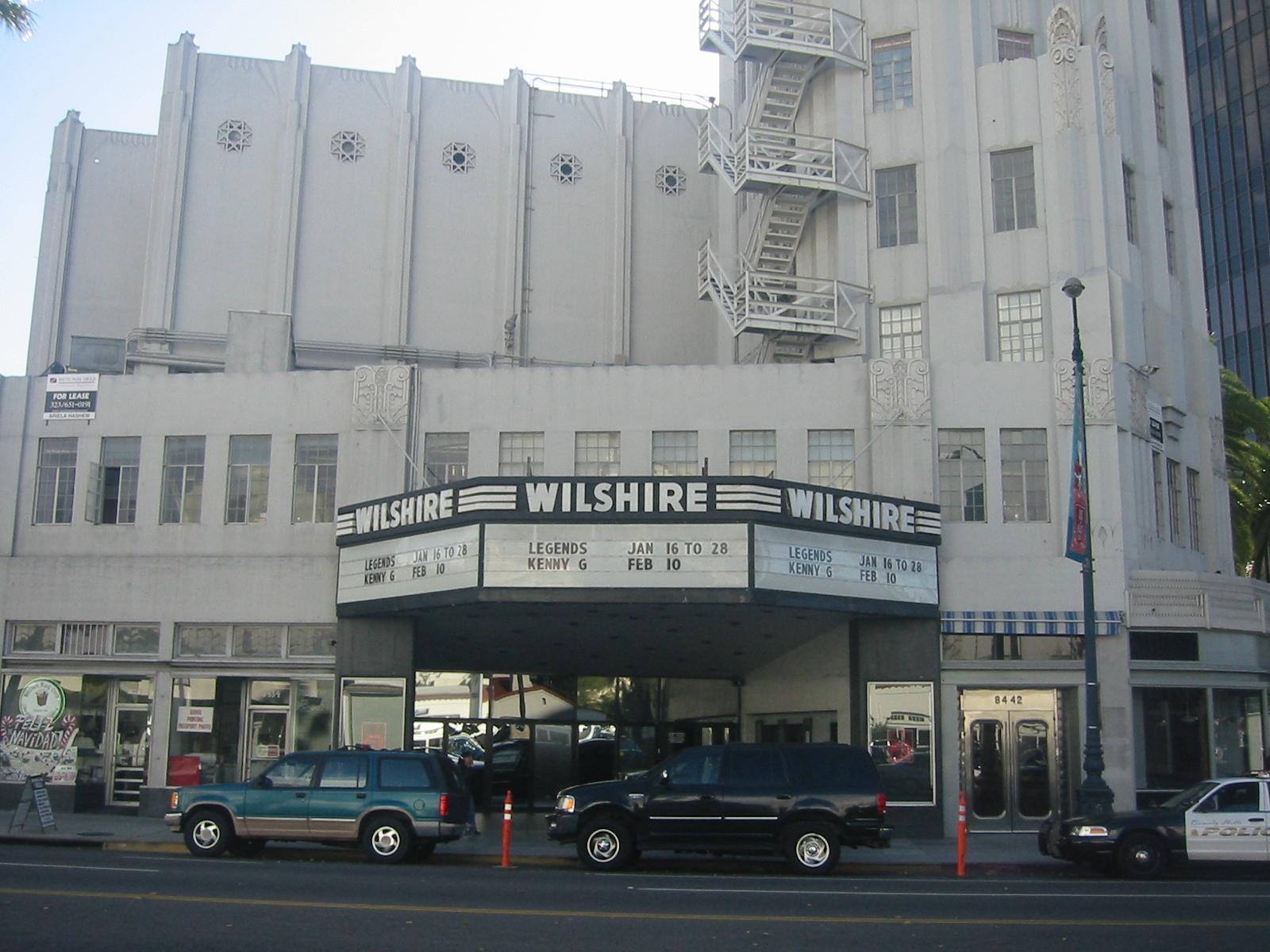
Wilshire Theater marquee, 2006

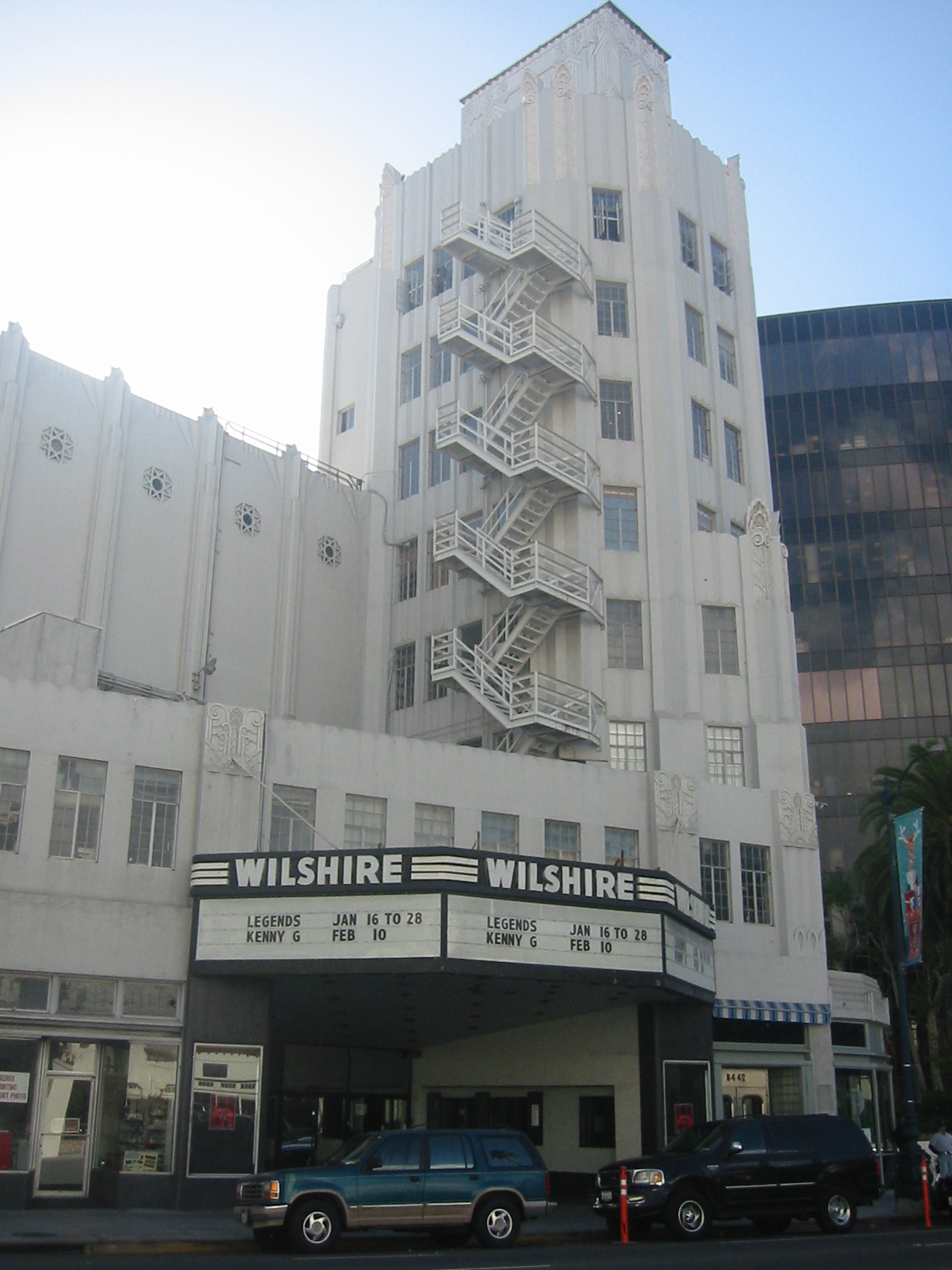
Northeastern elevation, 2006

The foyer depicted in 1929, shortly before opening

== See also ==
- National Register of Historic Places
