= Pilot Grove, Texas =

American community

Coordinates: 33°26′16″N 96°25′29″W

Pilot Grove, sometimes referred to as "Lickskillet" is a community located in Grayson County, Texas near the "Corners" region in Northeast Texas, which is where Grayson, Hunt, Fannin, and Collin county lines intersect. It is 700 feet above sea level.

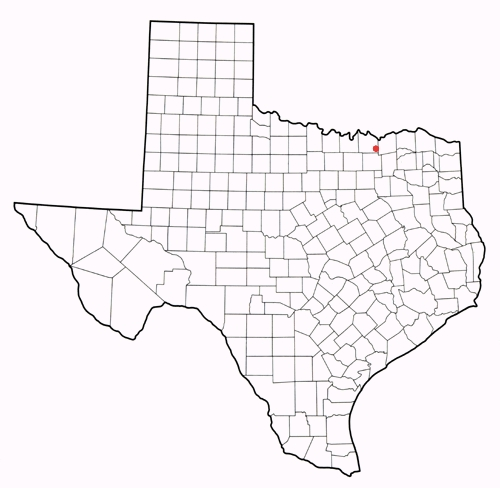
Pilot Grove, Texas

== History ==
The first settlement at what is now Pilot Grove was the result of French and Spanish expeditions in the area in 1836-1836. Prior to the arrival of Europeans, the area was inhabited by various Caddo groups, including the Kichai, Ionis, as well as the Tonkawa.

In 1841, Bluford Clement immigrated to the area, then part of Fannin County, prior to Texas statehood. Beginning in 1857, Clement began platting Pilot Grove as well as established a general store and post office.

Lee-Peacock Feud of 1867-1871

Pilot Grove also played host to several incidents involving the Lee-Peacock Feud of the area. In 1867, Captain Bob Lee, having fought for the Confederacy during the Civil War, ran into a Unionist named James (Jim) Maddox in the Pilot Grove general store. Lee, having been held hostage by Maddox and a party of sympathizers some time earlier, offered to duel, however, Maddox declined. Later that day, Maddox shot Lee and "friends took the wounded man to the home of Doctor William H. Pierce, who took care of Lee until he was up ready to go back home. On February 24, a Union man named Hugh Hudson came to Pierce’s home, perhaps looking for Lee. Not finding him, Hudson shot and killed the doctor in front of his house" in Pilot Grove.

It was the birthplace of American gambling icon and mob boss Benny Binion.

== Notable people ==
Benny Binion - American gambling icon born in Pilot Grove

== Geography ==
Latitude / Longitude (33.4378875, -96.4247062)
