= Four Queens =

Casino hotel in Nevada, United States

Coordinates: 36°10′11″N 115°8′37″W

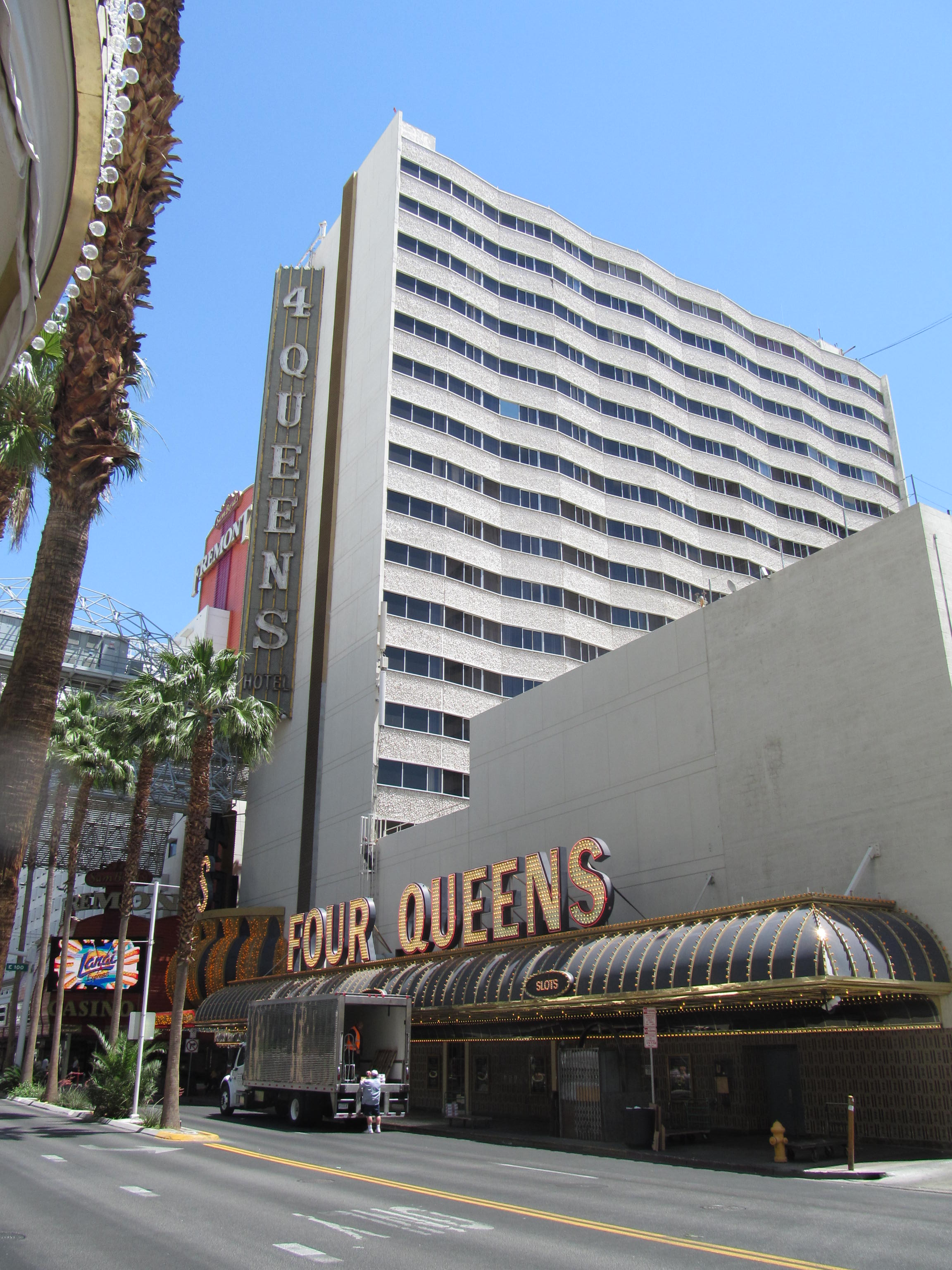
- The Four Queens and its original northern hotel tower, 2013

- Location within Downtown Las Vegas Location within Nevada
- Interactive map of Four Queens
- Location: Las Vegas, Nevada 89101; 202 East Fremont Street
- Opened: June 2, 1966; 60 years ago
- No. of rooms: 690
- Gaming space: 27,269 sq ft (2,533.4 m^{2})
- Signature attractions: Queen's Machine
- Notable restaurants: Hugo's Cellar
- Casino type: Land-based
- Owner: TLC Casino Enterprises
- Architect: Julius Gabriele (1964)
- Renovated in: 1976, 1981, 1995, 2007
- Website: www.fourqueens.com

The Four Queens (also stylized 4 Queens) is a hotel and casino in downtown Las Vegas, Nevada, on the Fremont Street Experience. The property includes a 690-room hotel and a 27,269 sq ft (2,533.4 m^{2}) casino. The Four Queens was developed by Ben Goffstein, who named it in reference to his four daughters. The casino opened on June 2, 1966, followed by the eight-story hotel two months later. The hotel opened with 115 rooms, and a 10-story addition was completed in 1969. Another 18-story tower was added in 1981.

Elsinore Corporation owned the property from 1973 to 2003, when it was sold to local businessman Terry Caudill. It is owned and operated through his company, TLC Casino Enterprises.

== History ==
The Four Queens was developed by Ben Goffstein, the former president of the Riviera hotel-casino. Joe Wells, the father of actress Dawn Wells, was also a partner in the Four Queens. A groundbreaking ceremony was held on November 16, 1964. The property was expected to open the following year, although construction later fell behind schedule. A drug store and several shops were demolished to make way for the Four Queens. The casino portion opened on June 2, 1966, accompanied by a promotional giveaway with prizes totaling $250,000. The hotel opened on August 12, 1966.

The property is named in reference to Goffstein's four daughters, each considered a variation of the Queen playing card: Faith (the Queen of Hearts), Hope (the Queen of Diamonds), Benita (the Queen of Clubs), and Michele (the Queen of Spades). According to Michele, "My parents were much more excited about it than we were. My father printed business cards for all of us. I was the Queen of Spades because I was the oldest. My mother had cards that said 'Joker' because there were only four queens." Ben Goffstein died at the age of 59, a year after the property opened. Tommy Callahan, initially an executive vice president, became president and general manager upon Goffstein's death. Callahan priced rooms at $10 a night, a practice that remained in effect for at least the next six years.

From 1973 to 2003, the Four Queens was owned by Elsinore Corporation, a wholly owned subsidiary of the Hyatt Corporation until 1979, when it became an independent company.

Jeanne Hood became the property's president in 1977, following the death of her husband David, who had held the position until that point. At the time, the only other woman in Las Vegas to oversee a gaming property was Claudine Williams at the Holiday Casino. Hood retained her position until 1993. Both women later died in 2009, and are among few who have served as gaming chiefs in Las Vegas.

Multiple unions, representing thousands of resort workers in Las Vegas, went on a year-long strike beginning in 1984. Employees at the Four Queens had been represented by the Culinary Workers Union until 1985, when they voted to decertify the union. It was the last resort still being picketed by striking workers. The Four Queens operated without union representation for the next decade, eventually signing a new contract with Culinary in 1998.

A $5 million renovation was completed in 1995. This coincided with the debut of the Fremont Street Experience, a portion of which runs along the front of the resort. Elsinore filed for Chapter 11 bankruptcy later in 1995, and an investment firm – known as Morgens, Waterfall, Vintiadis & Company – obtained 99 percent ownership of the company. A subsidiary of Riviera Holdings took over management of gaming operations, through a contract that expired at the end of 1999. Several attempts were made to sell the Four Queens during this time, but none of these came to fruition. Businessman Allen Paulson was among those who considered a purchase.

In 2002, local businessman Terry Caudill reached an agreement to purchase the Four Queens from Elsinore. The deal was terminated later that year, due to the prospect of an upcoming workers strike. However, union negotiations soon resulted in a new contract. Caudill and Elsinore reopened talks, and the property was sold in 2003, for $20 million. It is owned and operated through Caudill's company, TLC Casino Enterprises. Caudill owned a series of local slot bars, including the Magoo's chain. He said his experience in the locals gaming market would help to revitalize the Four Queens. He soon launched a $20 million, multiyear renovation which concluded in 2007.

The Four Queens was among filming locations for the 2023 television series Obliterated.

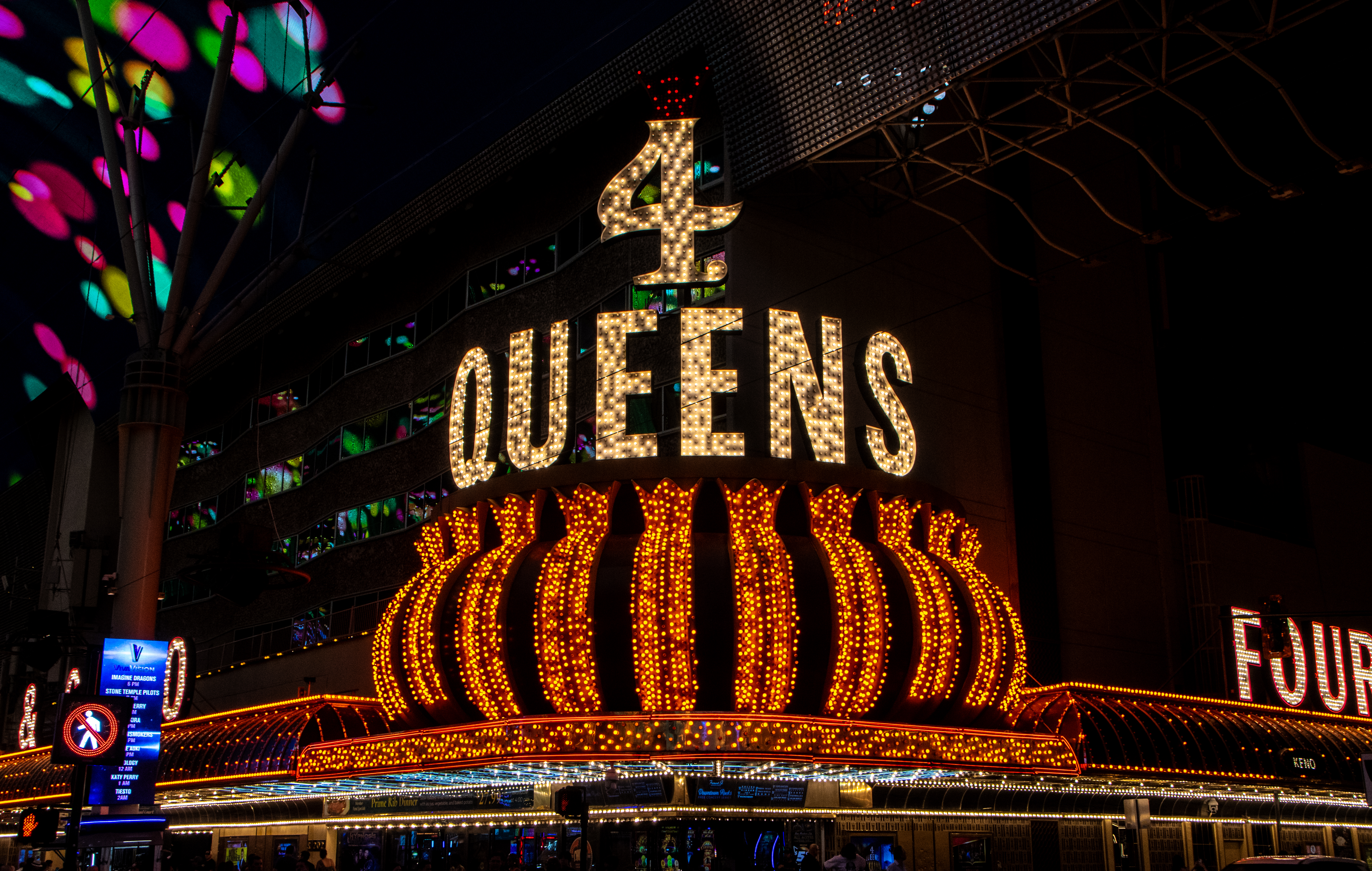
Four Queens facade along the Fremont Street Experience, 2025

== Property overview ==
=== Hotel and casino ===
The Four Queens occupies 3.2 acres (1.3 ha), mostly leased from various owners. The hotel originally opened with 115 rooms in an eight-story structure. The original architect was Julius Gabriele. The hotel was designed to easily allow the addition of new rooms at a later point. Construction on a 10-story addition began in 1968, and concluded the following year, bringing the room count to 325. A $26 million renovation and expansion was completed in 1981. It included a second 18-story tower, bringing the room count to 716. The 2007 renovation covered all hotel rooms, a total of 690 at that time. A $24 million renovation of the original tower began in 2024, and is scheduled to conclude the following year, with rooms being completely gutted and rebuilt.

The Four Queens Arcade, a casino expansion with 105 slot machines and a bar, opened in 1972. Located just east of the existing casino, the expansion opened in what used to be a gift shop known as the 4 Kings Arcade. A $3.5 million expansion was finished in 1976, in time for the property's 10th anniversary. The project enlarged the casino floor and added a new keno lounge.

In 1985, the casino added the world's largest slot machine. Known as the Queen's Machine, it measured 9 feet high, 18 feet long, and 8 feet wide. It supported up to six players simultaneously, and offered a $2 million jackpot. The Nevada Gaming Control Board questioned the odds of anyone ever winning the prize, with board member Guy Hillyer stating, "Statistically, our people felt the chances of hitting the big jackpot were miniscule [sic] for the next 1,000 years." The machine remained on the casino floor into the 1990s.

In 1996, the casino debuted the world's largest blackjack table. Three years later, it unveiled limited edition chips – featuring newly elected Las Vegas mayor Oscar Goodman – that soon sold out. Upon coming under Caudill's ownership, the property's 1,040 slot machines were replaced with updated, coinless units. In December 2003, the Four Queens became the first Las Vegas casino to offer Geoff Hall's blackjack variant Blackjack Switch, which later became widely available throughout the area. As of 2017, the casino is 27,269 sq ft (2,533.4 m^{2}).

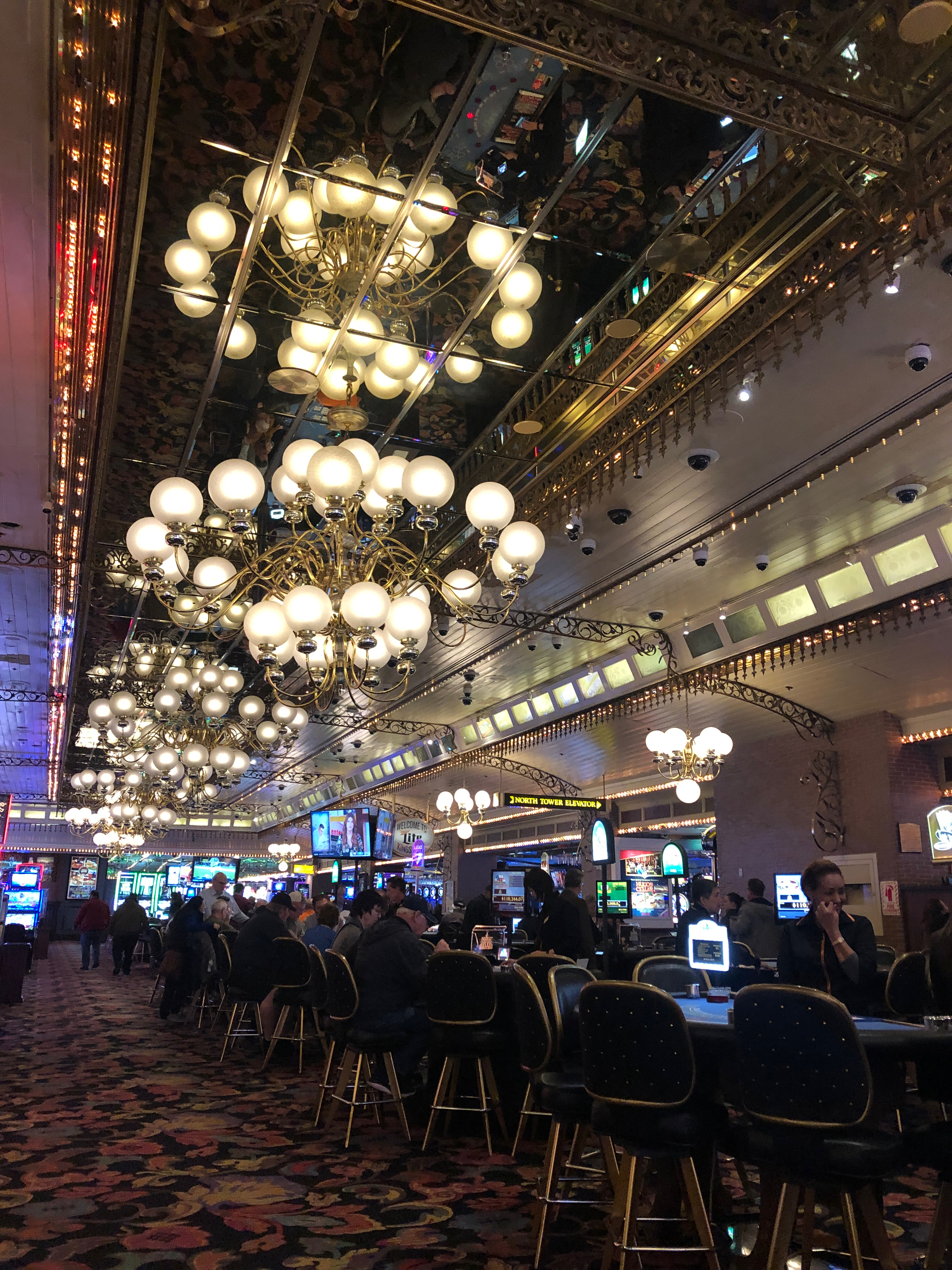
Casino floor in 2019

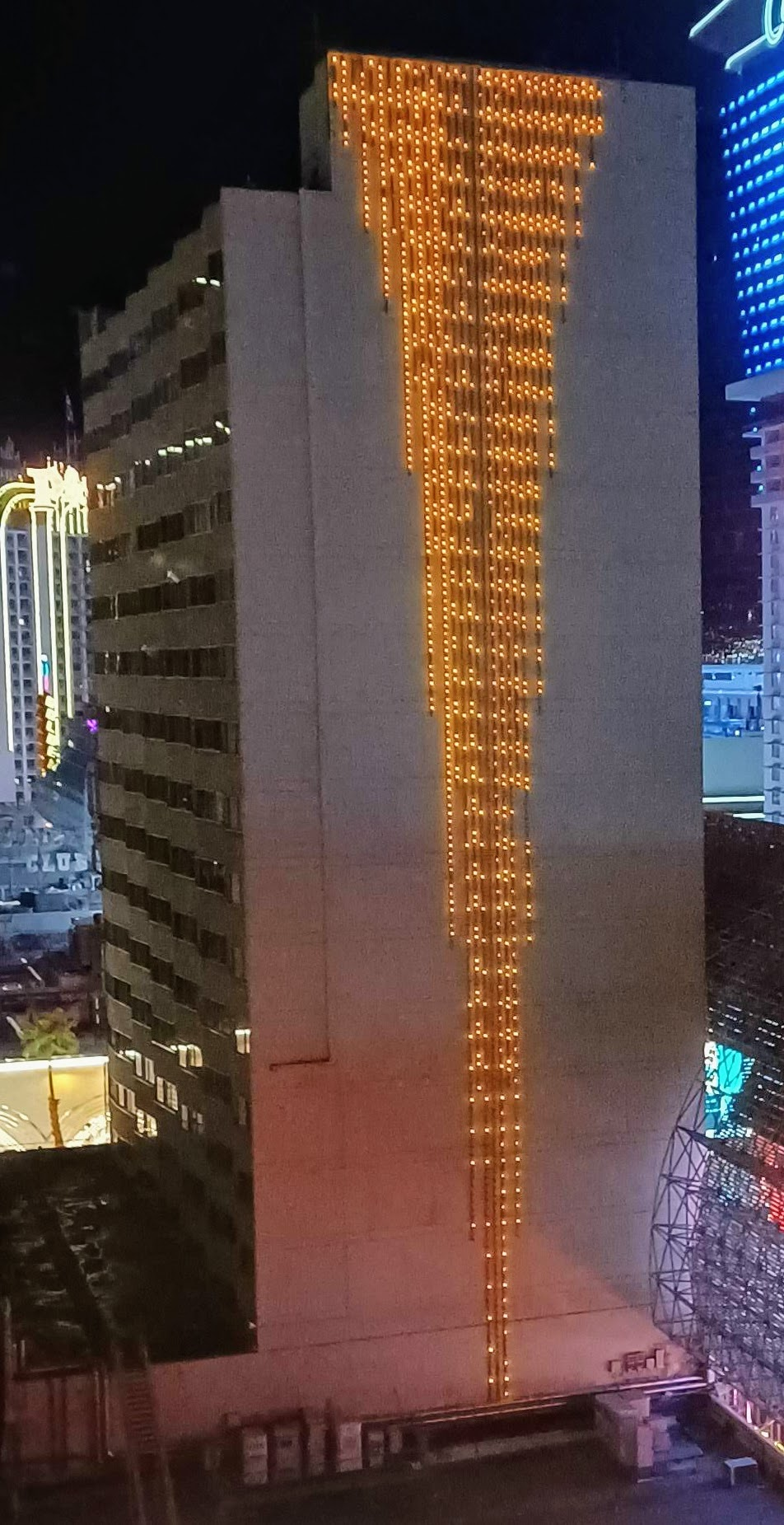
The original northern tower in 2022

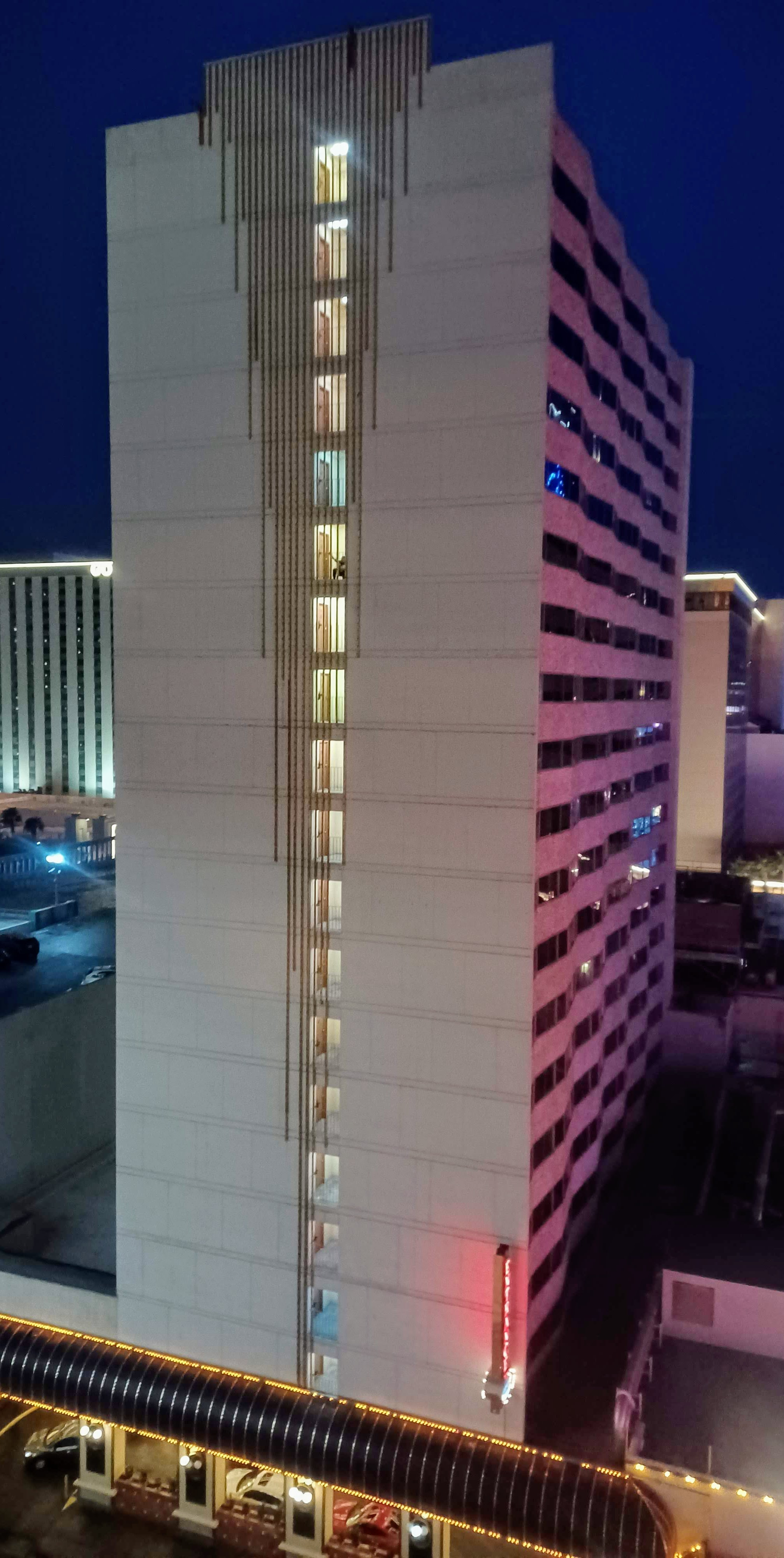
The newer southern tower, also in 2022

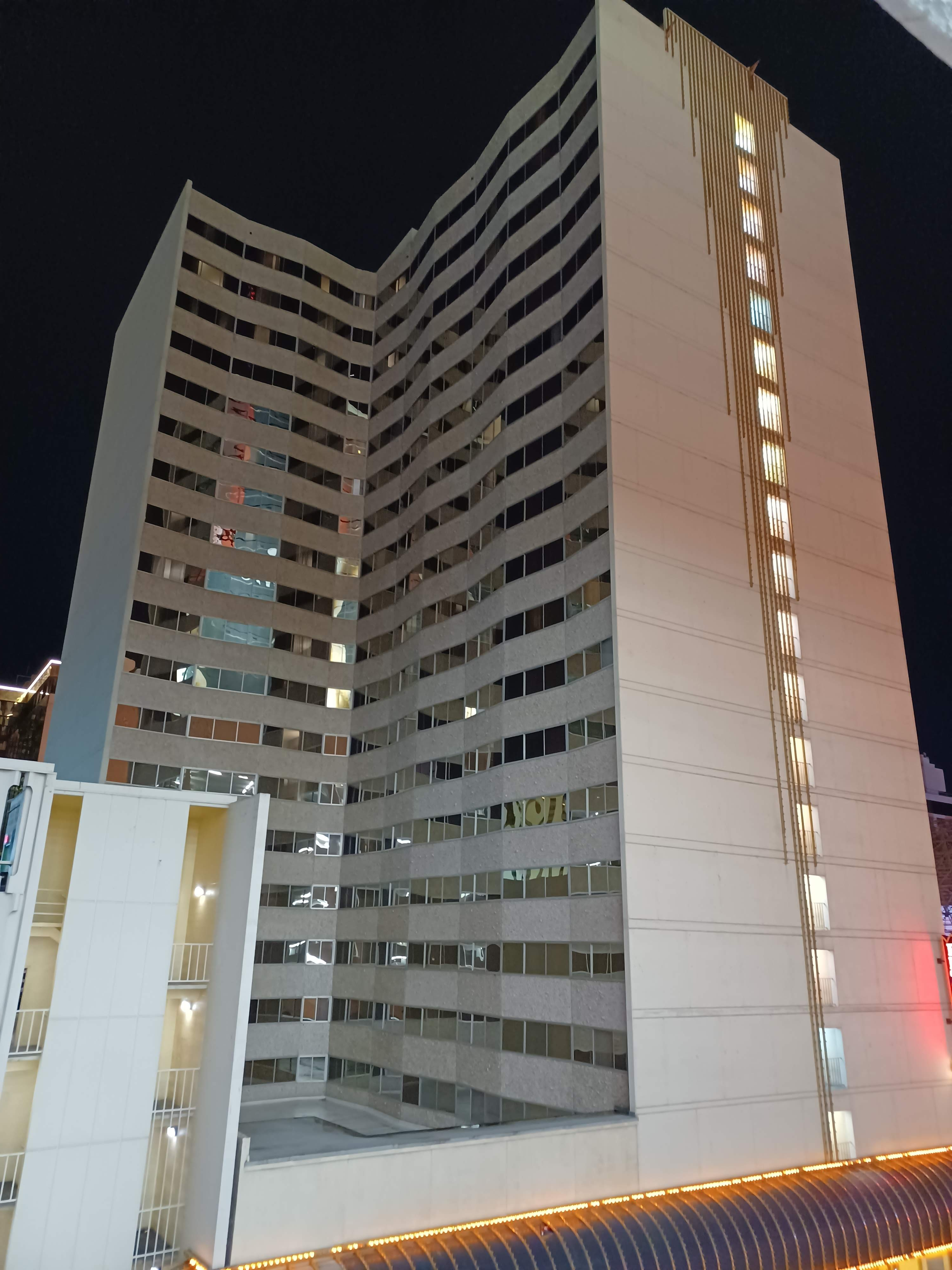
The same tower from an alternate angle

=== Other features ===
The 1976 renovation included a new restaurant, Hugo's Rotisserie. Later known as Hugo's Cellar, it is a popular gourmet restaurant. Another dining establishment, Chicago Brewing Company, was added with Caudill's $20 million renovation.

Several shops were replaced in 1985, when the Four Queens opened a Ripley's Believe It or Not! attraction, featuring various items of an unusual nature. It closed in 1993, and was converted into convention and meeting space. The space was then transformed into a nightclub, which marked completion of the 2007 renovation. The 10,000 sq ft (930 m^{2}) Canyon Club was built in partnership with Lance Sterling, who previously launched the House of Blues in Las Vegas. The Canyon Club was added to help reverse a decade-long trend of decreased gaming revenue at downtown casinos, which were losing customers to newer properties on the nearby Las Vegas Strip.

== Live entertainment ==
Monday Night Jazz, a weekly show featuring nationally known jazz performers, was launched at the Four Queens in 1982. It was also broadcast nationally on public radio stations. The show ran for 14 years, eventually ending as a result of Elsinore's bankruptcy. A comedy club, the Fun House, opened in 1997. At the time, it was one of only a few live entertainment venues in the downtown area. La Cage, a drag queen show, had played at the Riviera until 2009. It reopened at the Four Queens in 2011, though without the involvement of its original star Frank Marino. It closed within a year.

Four Queens hosts live performances including Mike Hammer Comedy Magic and Kevin Lepine's Hypnosis Unleashed.
