= TLC Casino Enterprises =

Casino holding company

TLC Casino Enterprises, Inc.
- Company type: Holding
- Founded: 2002; 24 years ago Downtown Las Vegas, Nevada, U.S.
- Founder: Terry Lee Caudill
- Headquarters: Downtown Las Vegas, Nevada, U.S.
- Key people: Terry L. Caudill (President and CEO)
- Products: Hotels; Casinos

TLC Casino Enterprises, Inc. is a holding company owned and controlled by Terry L. Caudill which through its subsidiaries, owns and operates casinos.

TLC Casinos, Inc. was founded in 2002 and is based in Downtown Las Vegas, Nevada. In addition to Magoo's Gaming Group, Caudill owns 3 casinos: Four Queens, Binion's Gambling Hall and Hotel, and Skinny Dugans Casino & Lounge.

In 2009, a landlord filed a lawsuit against TLC Casino Enterprises, "seeking back rent and the appointment of a receiver to take over the historic gambling hall" after TLC requested rent be lowered due to the recession.

TLC currently manages and operates the Hotel Apache which reopened after extensive renovation. According to Tim Lager, general manager of Binion, he wanted to "recreate what this hotel was when it opened as what was then a megaresort back in 1932".
