= Lance Sterling =

American entrepreneur (born 1962)

- Born: Lance Christopher Sterling; July 7, 1962 (age 64); Woodstock, New York, United States
- Occupation: Concert promoter/venue owner
- Known for: Original Investor, Partner and Operator, House of Blues, Tabernacle in Atlanta; Owner of Sterling Venue Ventures, including The Canyon Agoura Hills, The Rose, Saban Theatre, The Canyon Santa Clarita, The Libbey Bowl

Lance Sterling is an American entrepreneur and live entertainment venue owner who partnered early on with the House of Blues and its co-founder, Isaac Tigrett. During his time at the House of Blues, Sterling helped the company expand from three venues to more than 10, including those in top markets such as Las Vegas, Orlando, and Chicago. Sterling also owned and partnered with House of Blues to open the House of Blues Atlanta inside the Atlanta Baptist Tabernacle building in 1996. He was tasked with getting the space renovated and opened in under 60 days, which was accomplished when the venue opened in July 1996 for the 1996 Summer Olympics. Later, when House Of Blues backed away from the Atlanta venue, Sterling put an additional investment into the venue, renaming it The Tabernacle (named by Rolling Stone and USA Today as one of the best venues in the United States) and continuing to run it fully under his own banner. Under Sterling's direction, the Tabernacle hosted Tyler Perry's first successful stage production, "I Know I've Been Changed," in 1998. Sterling sold the venue to SFX Entertainment, Inc. in 1999.

Sterling is currently the owner of The Canyon Club Agoura Hills and The Canyon Montclair, a 1,500 seat club that opened in April 2019 and closed in 2025. He also operates the Saban Theatre concert venue in Beverly Hills, California and as well the Oxnard Performing Arts & Convention Center. He also produces concerts at the Starlight Bowl in Burbank. Rock, country, jazz and comedy heroes of the baby-boomer generation frequent his venues, as well as ‘80s one-hit wonders and the occasional punk show with a mosh pit of young people Sterling’s venues also host a wide range of private events such as mitzvahs, corporate parties, and weddings.

As music is becoming more corporate, large concert operators sometimes institute radius clauses in performers’ contracts that prohibit them from playing at independent venues within a certain distance of the corporate-owned locations. Sterling has countered with a strategy of trying to build up enough venues so he can offer musicians a regional circuit, and it’s working so well he has plans to extend the reach of his venues even further in the near future.

Since expanding into the Southern California market, approximately 2.5 million people have streamed through the venues doors this year to see notable artists and groups like B.B. King, Willie Nelson, Ray Davies, Etta James, Heart, Pat Benatar, Foreigner, REO Speedwagon, Mary Chapin Carpenter, local boys Big Bad Voodoo Daddy, Eddie Money Stone Temple Pilots, Frankie Valli, Paul Anka, Rick Springfield, Pat Benatar & Neil Giraldo and many others.

Sterling is also involved in the Fox Sports Grill chain and owned Canyon Club venues in Scottsdale, Arizona and Las Vegas. Recently, Sterling bought the rights to Los Angeles food franchise CaliBurger and opened locations adjacent to The Canyon in Santa Clarita and The Rose in Pasadena. Sterling plans to add a CaliBurger in the rest of his venues as well.

== Early life ==
Lance was born Lance Christopher Sterling in 1965, in Woodstock, New York. He was always into music but didn’t work in the industry until after his college years. He attended the University of Arizona where he studied civil engineering and then worked for several years as a structural engineer for a billboard company. After some time with the company, Sterling learned he could make more money as a concert promoter than as a civil engineer. He then went to work for Loews Hotel Corporation, where he would run the concerts & nightclubs and food & beverage divisions.

Sterling got his real start in the music industry in the early 1990s, when he met Hard Rock Cafe co-founder Isaac Tigrett, who was then starting the House of Blues. House of Blues went on to book artists such as Eric Clapton and Aerosmith and became one of the industry's best-known venue chains. In 1996, Sterling was charged with going to Atlanta to build and open the House of Blues Atlanta in time for the 1996 Olympics, a feat which he completed in under 60 days. When the company abandoned plans to continue the location in 1997, Sterling decided to run it independently as the Tabernacle, while continuing his work for House of Blues, travelling between Atlanta and Los Angeles weekly.

== Sterling Venue Ventures ==
Sterling sold the Tabernacle to SFX Entertainment Inc. in 1999 for $6 million, after turning down a House of Blues offer for $6 million in stock options. He then opened The Canyon in Agoura Hills in 2001, where the opening concert was Pat Benatar. Sterling targets the 30-and-over crowd with legacy acts such as Kenny Rogers, Blood, Sweat & Tears, Chris Isaak, Berlin, Styx, and Blue Öyster Cult. His customers are loyal, with the average patron attending nearly 12 shows a year at Sterling’s sub-2,000 seat venues.

In 2013, Sterling took over the 1,900-seat Saban Theatre, complete with $5 million in renovations courtesy of billionaire Haim Saban. At the restored Art Deco venue, Sterling faces competition from music industry giants such as AEG and Live Nation Entertainment Inc. Both companies are based in the L.A. area and operate many of the region's most popular live entertainment destinations including Nokia Theatre, Staples Center and House of Blues. Sterling opened The Rose and Caliburger in Pasadena in March 2016.

Sterling also produces concerts at The Libbey Bowl, in Ojai, CA. The venue, constructed in 1957, is outdoor and enchanting and has hosted numerous performances from some of the most influential artists in the world. When Sterling is not managing and running venues, or with his family, he is on the hunt scouting opportunities for new locations.

In the most recent Sterling Venue Ventures (SVV) project, Sterling opened The Canyon in Santa Clarita, California, which took over a former 25,000-square-foot Red Robin restaurant and will include another CaliBurger location. The club opened in December 2017. Since opening, the Valencia venue has quickly become the second-highest grossing location Sterling operates. SVV ranked at almost $20 million in revenue and, after the launch of the new venues, he hopes to increase this initial revenue, as well as the number of performances for this upcoming year.

== Personal life ==
Sterling has a wife, Caryn, and five children ranging in age from 24 to 37 years old. The family lives on a luscious 25-acre property in Ventura County, where they have an avocado ranch and sports fields they open up to some student sporting events and city league programs. The avocados Sterling grows have become the Mission Produce avocados that one can find at local grocery stores.

Aside from his passions of farming and music, Sterling says he loves football. Sterling’s sons played football, which was a great opportunity for Sterling to take on the role as a coach through Pop Warner. He even started his own Pop Warner kids’ football league in the Conejo Valley with over 200 players form Calabasas to Camarillo. Sterling is also a car hobbyist, having owned over 200 cars in his lifetime.

Sterling is also known for his compassion and generosity, toward the community and environment around him. At least once a month, he donates use of The Canyon and The Rose to different charities, usually related to education, and he is known to donate to non-profit organizations like Doctors Without Borders, Wounded Warriors, and more.
