= Benny Binion =

American gambling magnate and crime boss (1904–1989)

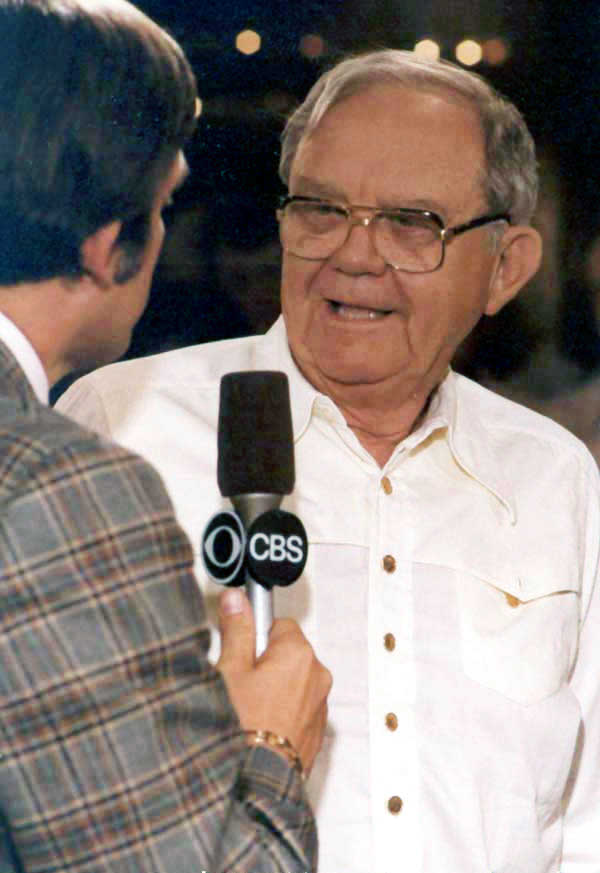
- Binion at the 1979 World Series of Poker
- Born: Lester Ben Binion; November 20, 1904; Pilot Grove, Texas, U.S.
- Died: December 25, 1989 (aged 85); Las Vegas, Nevada, U.S.
- Years active: 1924–1989
- Known for: Organized crime; Gambling; Binion Hoard
- Spouse: Teddy Jane
- Children: 5, including Jack and Ted
- Criminal information
- Occupations: Casino Operator; Mob Boss
- Motive: Money Laundry; Evolution of Poker

Lester Ben Binion (November 20, 1904 – December 25, 1989), better known as Benny Binion, was an American casino operator who established illegal gambling operations in the Dallas–Fort Worth area. In 1931, Binion was convicted of shooting and killing a rumrunner, Frank Bolding. In the 1940s, he relocated to Nevada, where gambling was legal, and opened the successful Binion's Horseshoe casino in downtown Las Vegas.

== Early history ==
Benny Binion was born and raised in Pilot Grove, Texas, north of Dallas. His parents initially kept him out of school due to poor health. His father, a horse trader, let him accompany him on trips. While the outdoor life restored his health, Binion never had any formal education. As he traveled with his father, the young man learned to gamble, a favorite pastime when horse traders met up with farmers and merchants during county fair trade days.

== Criminal history ==
Binion's FBI file reveals a criminal history dating back to 1924. At age 18 he moved to El Paso, where he began the crime of moonshining during the Prohibition era. A year later Binion moved to Dallas and continued moonshining, for which he was twice convicted. While moonshining, Binion came into contact with Warren Diamond and became a dice dealer for Diamond's St. George Hotel casino on Commerce Street in Dallas. In addition to his moonshining, in 1928, Binion opened up an even more lucrative numbers game.

On 5 October 1931, Binion was convicted of shooting and killing an African American rumrunner, Frank Bolding, "cowboy style." This was the origin of Binion's "Cowboy" nickname. Binion immediately phoned Dallas County sheriff Bill Decker and told him, "I just shot a nigger in my back yard. He come at me with a knife". Decker advised Binion to stand guard over the body and to make sure that it was not interfered with. Both Decker and the ambulance driver testified that upon arriving at the scene, they saw a five-inch switchblade next to Bolding's hand. Nevertheless, Binion pled guilty to murder and received a two-year suspended sentence. In 1936, Binion and an associate killed a numbers operator and competitor, Ben Frieden, emptying their pistols into him. Binion then allegedly shot himself in the shoulder and turned himself in to police, claiming that Frieden had shot him first. Binion was indicted, but the indictment was later dismissed on the grounds that Binion had acted in self-defense. Two years later, Binion and his associates allegedly killed Sam Murray, another Binion competitor in the gambling rackets. Binion was never indicted for this murder, and charges were dropped against his associates. In the same year that Frieden was murdered, Binion established a network of private dice games at several Dallas hotels, including the Southland Hotel in downtown Dallas. This came to be known as the Southland Syndicate.

By the end of 1936, Binion had gained control of most gambling operations in Dallas, with protection from a powerful local politician. He ran a famous casino known as the Top O' Hill Terrace in Arlington, as well as a horse track. These venues, in addition to other smaller ones in Arlington, attracted celebrities from around the nation. By the early 1940s, he had become the reigning mob boss of Dallas, and was seeking to take over the gambling rackets in Fort Worth. The local mob boss of that city, Lewis Tindell, was murdered shortly afterwards.

With the 1946 election of Steve Guthrie as sheriff of Dallas County, Binion lost his fix with the local government and fled to Las Vegas, Nevada. Shortly afterward a long-running feud between Binion and Herbert Noble, a small-time Dallas gambler, boiled over when Noble refused to increase his payoff to Binion from 25 to 40 percent. Binion posted a reward on Noble's life, which eventually reached $25,000 and control of a Dallas crap game. Noble survived numerous murder attempts, sometimes narrowly escaping with gunshot wounds. In November 1949, his wife was killed in a car bombing intended for him. In retaliation, Noble planned to fly his private plane to Las Vegas to bomb Binion's house, but was restrained by local law enforcement before he could execute his plan. In August 1951, as Noble drove up to his mailbox, a bomb exploded nearby, killing him instantly.

Binion was close to Dallas County sheriff Bill Decker. Binion stated that he and Decker were simply "goddamn good friends". He denied ever bribing Decker; "I never give him a dollar, never give him nothing. Never bought him a hat, never give him nothing". Decker allowed Binion's criminal operations to go on unhindered, Binion admitted that Decker "never bothered me in my operations no way, shape or form". They had a mutually beneficial relationship; whenever Binion wanted rivals shut down he called Decker, and whenever Decker wanted somebody run out of Dallas he called Binion. When Decker won the sheriff's election 1948, his campaign was financed by Binion who stated "Maybe I put up something like $3,500. No strings attached to that money. I just give it to him for old times sake".

Binion lost his Nevada gaming license in 1951 and was sentenced to a five-year term in 1953 at Leavenworth federal penitentiary for tax evasion.

== Casino years ==
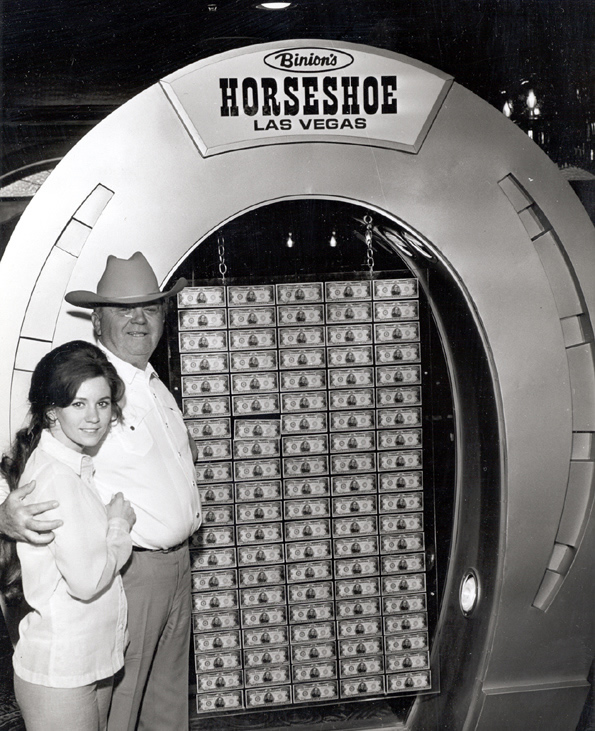
Benny Binion with his youngest daughter Becky (eventual owner of Binion's Horseshoe) in front of the famous $1 million display – 100 United States ten-thousand-dollar bills (c. 1969).

In Las Vegas, Binion became a partner of the Las Vegas Club casino, but left after a year due to licensing problems. In 1949, he opened the Westerner Gambling House and Saloon, but he soon sold out after conflicts with his casino partners.

In 1951, Binion purchased the Eldorado Club and the Apache Hotel, opening them as Binion's Horseshoe, which immediately became popular because of the high limits on bets. He initially set a table limit of $500 for craps. As a result of outdoing the competition he received death threats, although eventually casinos raised their limits to keep up with him. Additionally, the Horseshoe would allow a bet of any size from a player, as long as the player's subsequent bets were no larger than the player's initial bet.

Binion was in the vanguard of Las Vegas casino innovation. He was the first in the downtown Glitter Gulch to replace sawdust-covered floors with carpeting, the first to dispatch limousines to transport customers to and from the casino, and the first to offer free drinks to players. Although comps were standard for high rollers, Binion gave them to all players. He also shied away from the gaudy performing acts typical of other Las Vegas casinos.

Binion was known to be generous to patrons, and said he followed a simple philosophy when serving his customers: "Good food, good whiskey cheap, and a good gamble." For many years, the Horseshoe had a late night $2 steak special, with most of the meat for the steaks coming from cattle on Binion's ranches in Montana. The Horseshoe is also believed to be the first major casino to offer 100-times-odds at craps (a patron with a bet on the pass or don't-pass lines could take or lay up to 100 times their bet in odds). It was one of the more profitable casinos in town.

After his trial and conviction in 1953, to cover back taxes and legal costs, Binion sold a majority share in the Horseshoe to fellow gambler and New Orleans oilman Joe W. Brown. Binion's family regained controlling interest in the Horseshoe in 1957, but did not regain full control until 1964. Binion was never allowed to hold a gaming license afterwards. Instead, his son Jack became president and nominal licensee, with Benny assuming the title of Director of Public Relations.

In Las Vegas, July 1972, attorney William Coulthard was killed when four sticks of dynamite placed beneath the steering wheel blew up his Cadillac and four other cars in its vicinity. It was believed by the Las Vegas police that James Henry Dolan had carried out the bombing on behalf of Binion. Dolan was imprisoned at Fort Leavenworth at the same time as Binion.

Binion styled himself a cowboy throughout his life. He almost never wore a necktie and used gold coins as buttons on his cowboy shirts. Despite being technically barred from owning guns, he carried at least one pistol all his life and kept a sawed-off shotgun close by. His office was a booth in the downstairs restaurant, and he knew many of his customers by name.

== Poker ==
Binion didn't consider himself to be very good at poker, nor did he participate much in competition or private cash games, preferring to organize them. However, in 1990 he was inducted posthumously into the Poker Hall of Fame for his contributions to the game.

== Family ==
Binion and his wife, Teddy Jane, had five children: two sons, Jack and Ted, and three daughters. Jack and Ted took over as president and casino manager, respectively, in 1964. Benny's wife, Teddy Jane, managed the casino cage until her death in 1994. In 1998, Binion's daughter, Becky, took over the presidency after a legal battle, and Jack moved on to other gambling interests. Becky's presidency saw the casino sink into debt. In 2004, federal agents seized $1 million from the Horseshoe's bankroll to satisfy unpaid union benefits, forcing its closure and eventual sale to Harrah's Entertainment. It now operates as Binion's Gambling Hall and Hotel under the ownership of TLC Gaming Group.

Benny Binion's son, Ted Binion, was under scrutiny from the Nevada Gaming Commission from 1986 onwards for his involvement in drugs and associating with organized crime figures. Ted's gaming license was revoked in 1989, and he died in mysterious circumstances about a decade later. Ted's live-in girlfriend, Sandra Murphy, and her lover, Rick Tabish, were charged and convicted of murdering Ted, but the verdict was later overturned. They were retried and acquitted.

Ted Binion had a collection of silver coins that he buried on one of his properties. He collected 135,000 silver dollars and stored them in an underground safe in Pahrump, Nevada. The collection was known as the Binion Hoard. After Ted's death there were several arrests of individuals who tried to steal the silver.

== Legacy ==
In January 1949, Benny Binion arranged for Johnny Moss and Nick "The Greek" Dandolos to play a head-to-head poker tournament which ended up lasting five months, with Dandolos ultimately losing a reported two million dollars. The 42-year-old Moss had to take breaks to sleep occasionally, during which Dandalos, then aged 57, went over to the craps table and played. After the final hand, and losing millions of dollars, Dandolos uttered one of the most famous poker quotes of all time: "Mr. Moss, I have to let you go." (This narrative is disputed as fact and is most likely a myth. Binion didn't operate a casino until 1951 in Las Vegas.)

In 1970, after years of arranging heads-up matches between high-stakes players, Binion invited six players to compete in a tournament. Playing no-limit Texas Hold'em, the players competed for cash at the table and later took a vote on who was to be named champion. Moss, then aged 63, was voted champion by his younger competition and received a small trophy. The following year, a freeze-out format was introduced with a $10,000 buy-in, and the World Series of Poker was born. Binion's creation of the World Series helped popularize the game of poker, though he greatly underestimated how popular the World Series would become. In 1973, he speculated that eventually the tournament might have fifty or so entrants. However, by 2006, the tournament's main event (not including all of the other events) would have 8,773 entrants.

Binion never forgot his Texas roots and was a key player in getting the National Finals Rodeo (NFR) to move to Las Vegas. He never forgot the cowboys after they arrived; he always paid the entry fees for all of the cowboys for their championship event. When the casino closed, Boyd Gaming took up the tradition that Binion started by continuing to pay all the entry fees. Every year during the NFR there is a large rodeo stock auction called "Benny Binion's World Famous Bucking Horse and Bull Sale."

Binion was also the owner of a horse named "Nigger" (later referred to as "Benny Binion's Gelding") who was the 1946, 1947, and 1948 National Cutting Horse Association (NCHA) World Champion. Bred by Binion, ridden and trained by George Glascock, the solid black 15 hand gelding is the only horse to capture the NCHA World Championship three years in a row.

== Death ==
Binion died of heart failure at the age of 85 on December 25, 1989, in Las Vegas. Poker great "Amarillo Slim" Preston suggested as an epitaph, "He was either the gentlest bad guy or the baddest good guy you'd ever seen."

== See also ==
- History of vice in Texas
- Sam Maceo
