= Sunrise Mountain (Nevada) =

Mountain in Nevada, United States

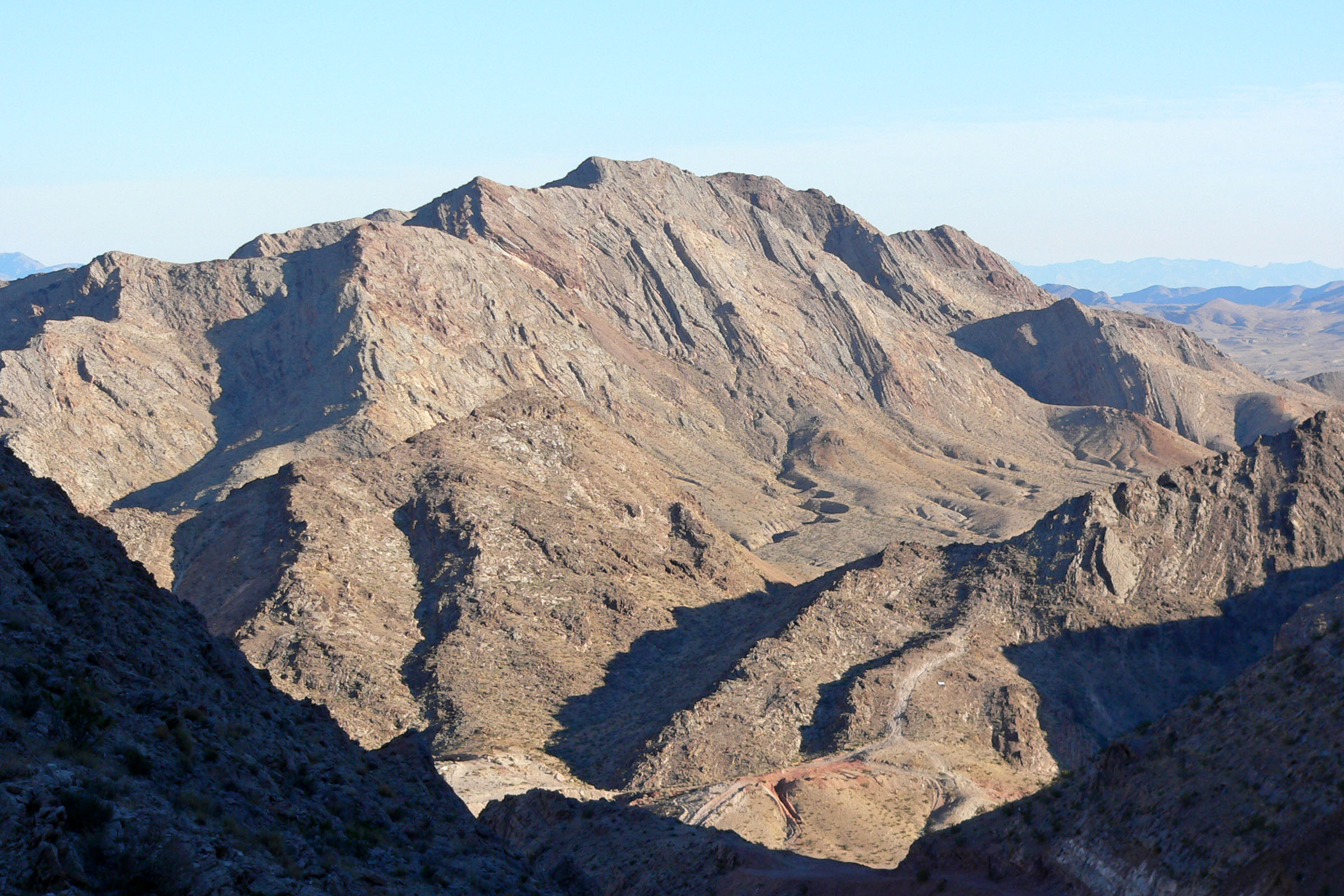
- Sunrise Mountain seen from road/trail up Frenchman Mountain

Highest point
- Elevation: 3,366 ft (1,026 m) NAVD 88
- Prominence: 924 ft (282 m)
- Coordinates: 36°13′28″N 114°58′37″W

Geography
- Location: Clark County, Nevada, U.S.
- Topo map: USGS Frenchman Mountain

Sunrise Mountain is located east of Las Vegas in Clark County, Nevada.

Even though Sunrise Mountain is over 3.3 miles (5.3 km) NNW of higher peak Frenchman Mountain many people in the Las Vegas Valley refer to Frenchman Mountain as Sunrise Mountain since the sun rises from behind it. This confusion dates back many years and the National Geodetic Survey bench mark placed in 1947 on the summit of Frenchman Mountain is designated "Sunrise". During World War II the U.S. Army maintained an airway beacon on the summit and as of 2007, remains of the tower could still be found.

Local conservationists have proposed the area, along with Gypsum Cave and Frenchman Mountain, be protected as a national monument.
