= Speed – The Ride =

Launched roller coaster in Las Vegas, Nevada

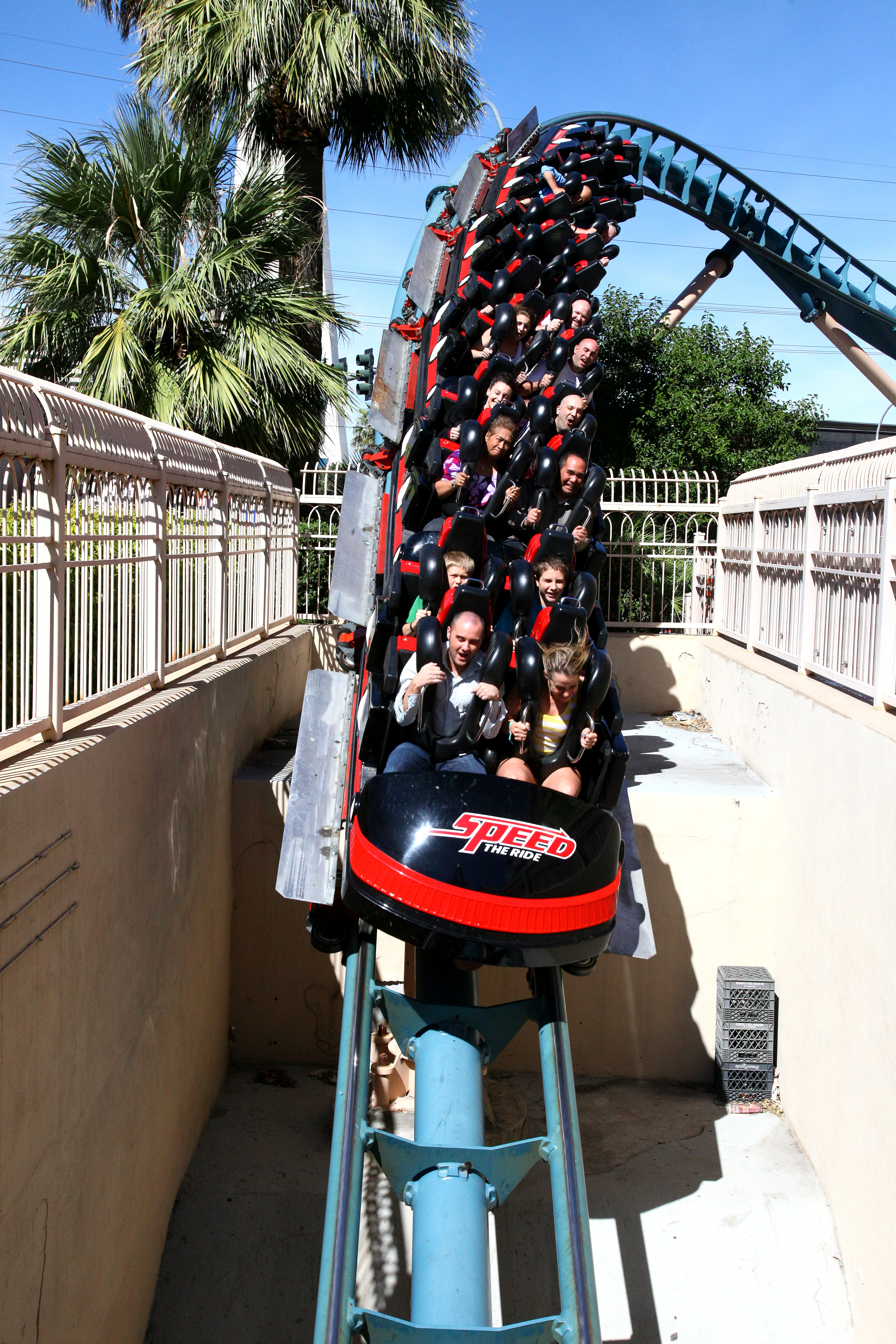

Akita Plaza
- Coordinates: 36.093031°N 115.171732°W
- Status: Removed

Sahara Hotel and Casino
- Park section: Nascar Café
- Coordinates: 36°08′36″N 115°09′25″W
- Status: Removed
- Opening date: April 28, 2000
- Closing date: May 1, 2011

General statistics
- Type: Steel – Launched – Shuttle
- Manufacturer: Premier Rides
- Designer: Werner Stengel
- Height: 224 ft (68 m)
- Length: 1,365 ft (416 m)
- Speed: 70 mph (110 km/h)
- Inversions: 1 (transversed twice)
- Duration: 0:45
- Max vertical angle: 90°
- Capacity: 1600 riders per hour
- Acceleration: 0 to 45 to 70mph
- G-force: 3.5
- Height restriction: 54 in (137 cm)
- Trains: Single train with 6 cars; riders arranged 2 across in 2 rows for a total of 24 riders per train
- Speed – The Ride at RCDB

Speed – The Ride was a roller coaster in storage at Akita Plaza on the Las Vegas Strip in Nevada. Originally located at the Sahara Hotel and Casino, it opened to the public on April 28, 2000, and closed on May 1, 2011.

== History ==
=== NASCAR Café (2000–2012) ===
Speed – The Ride was constructed during the Sahara Hotel and Casino's 1999 remodeling, as part of the NASCAR Café addition. Original plans called for an indoor roller coaster with a maximum height of 100 feet (30 m), but the layout was later modified. The ride was designed and manufactured by Premier Rides and fabricated by Intermountain Lift, Inc.

The Sahara casino closed on May 16, 2011. The outdated resort had been suffering from decline and lack of upkeep in prior years. Speed – The Ride ceased operation prior to the hotel's closure on May 1, 2011. Dismantling of the coaster began in April 2012.

=== Akita Plaza ===
According to the contractor dismantling the ride, Speed was to be reinstalled at Akita Plaza, a small shopping center across the street from Mandalay Bay, which also planned to add new restaurants and a concert venue. The Akita Plaza development later stalled, and Speed – The Ride remained dismantled and in storage at the site. By 2019, a portion of the ride was recycled for scrap and the rest is still in storage since December 22, 2022.

== Ride experience ==
The ride began with a launch from the inside of the NASCAR Café, accelerating from 0–45 mph (0–72 km/h) in two seconds. The train dropped into an underground tunnel in front of the resort and then passed through a 92-foot (28 m) vertical loop. Afterwards, a second launch accelerated the train from 35–70 mph (56–113 km/h) in two seconds. After a quick snaking turn, the train traveled up a 224-ft (68m) tower before falling and traversing the entire course backwards. On the return trip, the second launch area decelerated the train from 70–35 mph (113–56 km/h) before traveling back through the vertical loop and the underground tunnel. The train then reached the final brake run and returned to the station.

== See also ==
- 2011 in amusement parks
