= Sam by Starck =

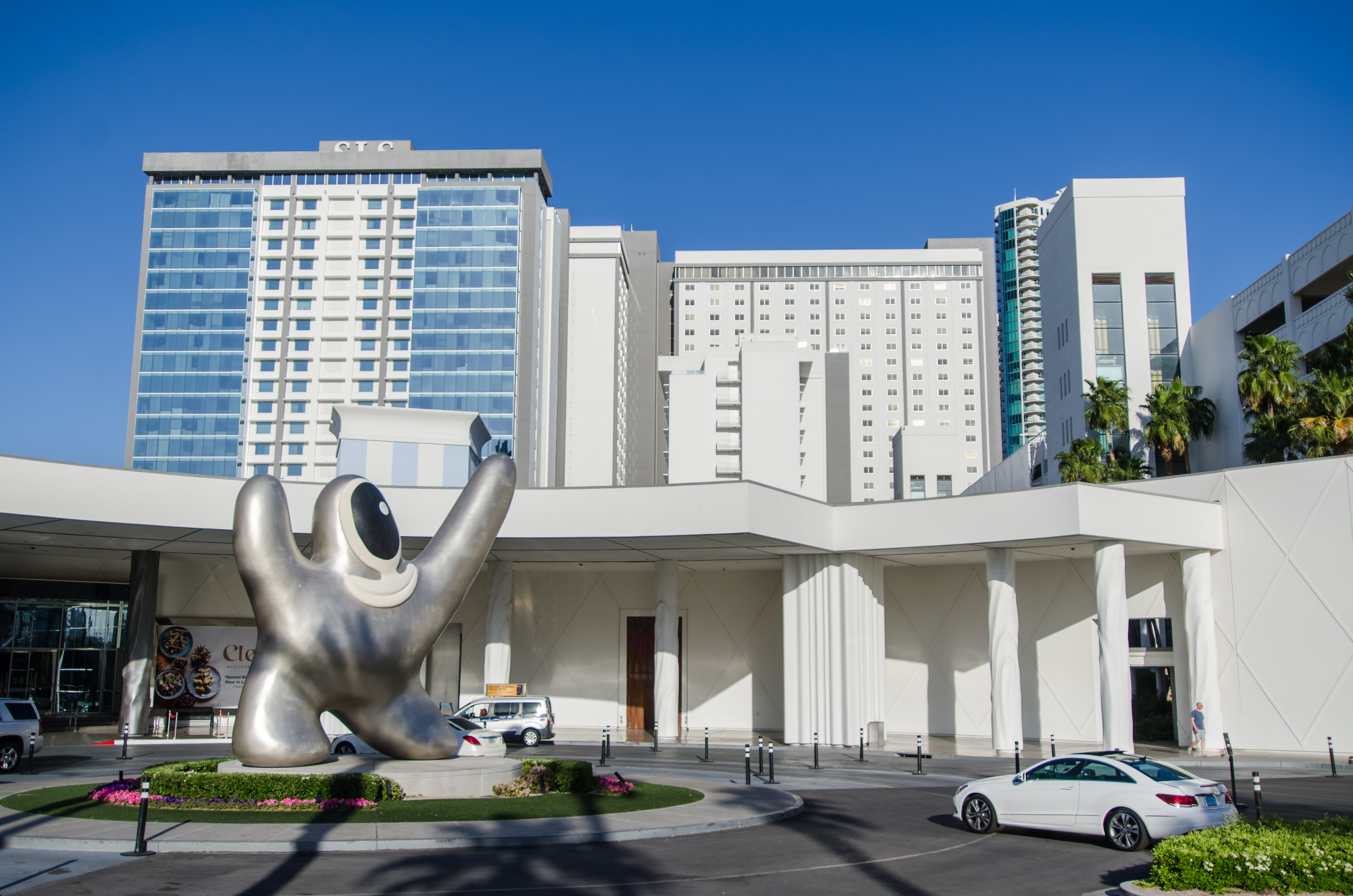
- The statue in 2018
- Artist: Philippe Starck
- Location: Las Vegas, Nevada, U.S.

Sam by Starck was a 32-foot (9.8 m) abstract statue by Philippe Starck in Las Vegas. The work was removed in 2019.
