= O'Sheas Casino =

Casino in Paradise, Nevada

- Location within Las Vegas Strip Location within Nevada
- Interactive map of O'Sheas Casino
- Location: Paradise, Nevada, U.S.; 3555 South Las Vegas Boulevard (original location) 3535 South Las Vegas Boulevard (The Linq); 36°07′03.4″N 115°10′16.8″W
- Opened: July 1, 1989; 37 years ago (original location); December 27, 2013; 12 years ago (new location)
- Theme: Irish
- Gaming space: 22,000 sq ft (2,000 m^{2}) (original location); 5,000 sq ft (460 m^{2}) (new location)
- Signature attractions: Vince Neil Ink
- Owner: Caesars Entertainment
- Architect: Rissman & Rissman (original location)
- Renovated in: 2007
- Website: caesars.com/linq/hotel/things-to-do/o-sheas

O'Sheas Casino is an Irish-themed casino located within The Linq Promenade, an outdoor entertainment district on the Las Vegas Strip in Paradise, Nevada. O'Sheas originally opened on July 1, 1989 and operated in between the Flamingo and Imperial Palace resorts. The original location included a 22,000 sq ft (2,000 m^{2}) casino.

Owner Caesars Entertainment Corporation announced in 2011 that O'Sheas would close and relocate to become part of the upcoming Linq Promenade. O'Sheas closed on April 30, 2012, and opened in its new 5,000 sq ft (460 m^{2}) location on December 27, 2013. It connects to the casino at The Linq resort, which previously operated as the Imperial Palace. The new O'Sheas, like its original location, is known for its cheap beer and gaming, as well as beer pong.

== History ==
Hilton Nevada Corporation broke ground for the O'Sheas casino on September 7, 1988. The project was built on the Las Vegas Strip, north of the company's Flamingo Hilton hotel-casino. O'Sheas was built on property that was being used as a parking lot for tour buses. Hilton officials were surprised to learn that they owned the land and set forth to build O'Sheas on the site. The five-story building included three floors for parking space.

O'Sheas opened on July 1, 1989, and featured an Irish theme. R. Duell & Associates of Los Angeles was the designer, and Rissman & Rissman of Las Vegas was the architect. O'Sheas was designed to resemble an Irish pub, and included hardwood floors, brass, Irish artifacts, and detailed wall designs. The casino also included a food court.

The casino cost $22 million, and its target clientele was middle-income tourists. Unlike most of the casinos on the Strip, O'Sheas was not part of a resort and had no hotel. It was operated in conjunction with the Flamingo Hilton. O'Sheas' location between the Flamingo Hilton and Imperial Palace resorts meant that many pedestrians simply bypassed the small casino, which lost around $2 million in its first six months. It laid off approximately 60 employees in January 1990 and announced a deal for the Flamingo Hilton to take over operations, At the end of the year, Hilton announced it would give the casino a makeover and rename it Bugsy's, after Flamingo developer Bugsy Siegel. O'Sheas ultimately retained its original name, and would go on to become successful.

O'Sheas is briefly featured in the 1997 film Vegas Vacation, when character Rusty Griswold wins a car through a slot machine sitting outside the casino.

On February 26, 2000, O'Sheas made the 2001 edition of the Guinness Book of World Records by having 220 patrons contribute to the largest crowd to participate in a nationwide toast. The Great Guinness Toast, as it is called, was tallied nationwide as having 320,470 participants, breaking the previous year's record of 197,846 participants.

A poker room was added in 2007, as part of remodeling work.

=== Relocation ===
Owner Caesars Entertainment Corporation announced in August 2011 that O'Sheas would close and be relocated to the upcoming Linq Promenade, an outdoor entertainment district to be built on part of the casino's property. O'Sheas had 285 employees. The 22,000 sq ft (2,000 m^{2}) casino included 453 slot machines and 45 table games.

O'Sheas closed on April 30, 2012. The following day, the casino's 7-story rear parking structure was imploded as part of the Linq project. The site of the original O'Sheas has been replaced by the Vortex, a multi-story structure marking the entrance to the Linq Promenade.

O'Sheas reopened on December 27, 2013, as part of the promenade. The new location contains 5,000 sq ft (460 m^{2}), and is also connected to the casino floor at The Linq hotel-casino, formerly the Imperial Palace. The new O'Sheas includes three bars. Like its predecessor, it is known for its cheap beer and blackjack, as well as beer pong. Both locations have also been popular spots for St. Patrick's Day celebrations. Another O'Sheas location opened at Harrah's Philadelphia in 2022, offering a bar and gaming.

== Attractions and entertainment ==
The original O'Sheas offered several attractions as well as live entertainment. In 1994, the casino added the Magic and Movie Hall of Fame to its second floor, sharing space with a performance theater. Ventriloquist Valentine Vox served as the museum's general manager and artistic director, and also performed in the adjacent Houdini Theatre. The Hall of Fame closed shortly after 1999, following a lease dispute with the casino's owner. In 2006, Vince Neil, lead singer of the band Mötley Crüe, opened Vince Neil Ink, a tattoo parlor inside of O'Sheas. It featured a room called "The Stage" that was visible from the Las Vegas Strip, so visitors could watch the tattoo artists work from outside.

Hypnotist Justin Tranz began performing in the theater in 1999. As of 2004, it was one of the longest-running hypnosis shows in Las Vegas. Comedian Vinnie Favorito entertained at the casino from 2005 to 2008. Freaks, a show featuring an array of unusual performers, opened in 2009. It included glass eaters, sword swallowers, and knife throwers. Mentalist Luke Jermay also opened a mind-reading show. Magician Dirk Arthur began performing at the casino in 2010. Viper Vixens, a dance show featuring topless women armed with various weapons, ran during 2011. Local band Imagine Dragons also performed at the original O'Sheas.

A leprechaun, originally known as Paddy, has served as the casino's longtime mascot, dating back to the original location. In 2006, little person Brian Thomas was hired to portray Lucky the Leprechaun and interact with guests, becoming popular among them. Thomas later returned to portray the character at the new O'Sheas.

== Gallery ==
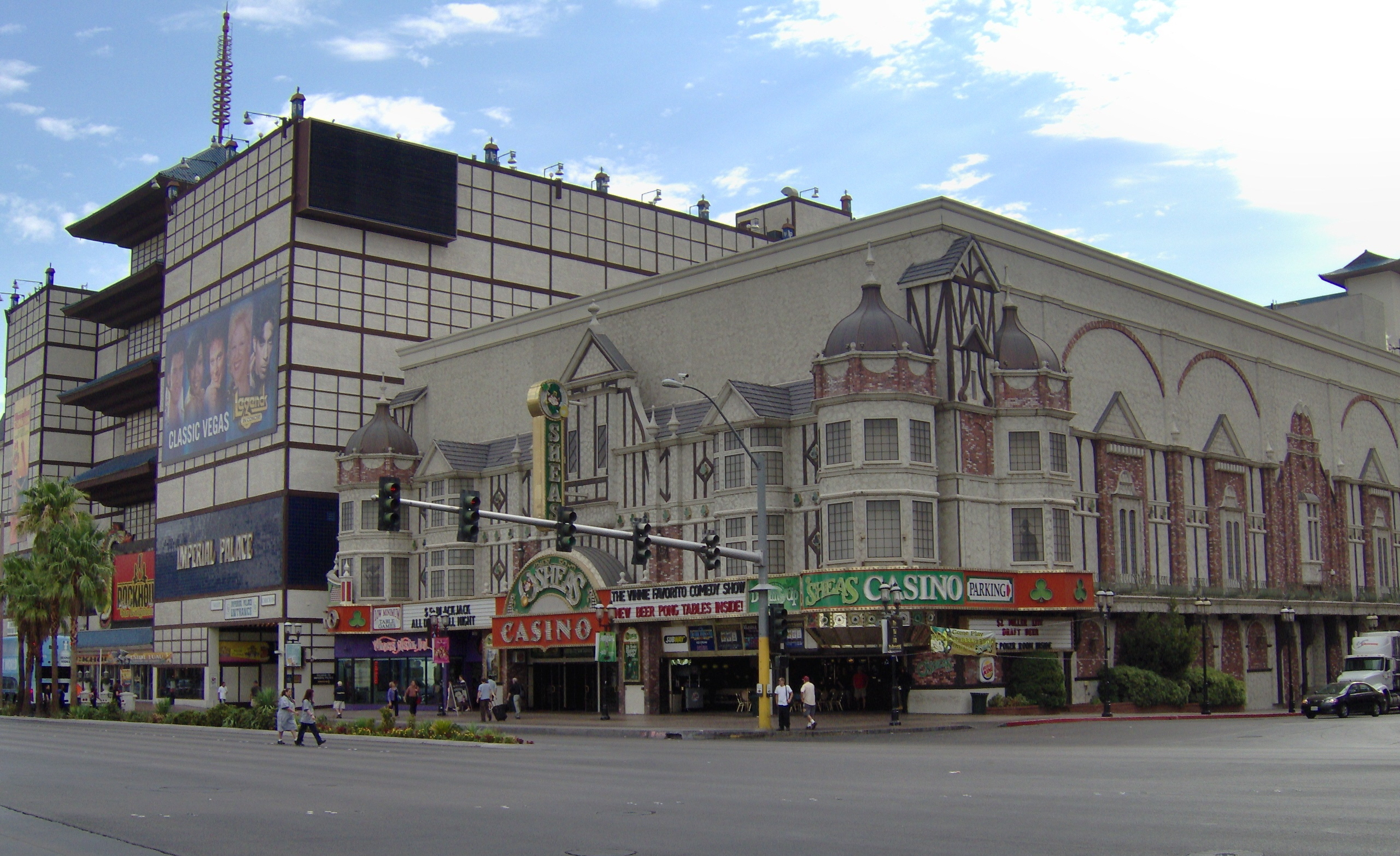
The original O'Sheas, seen in 2007

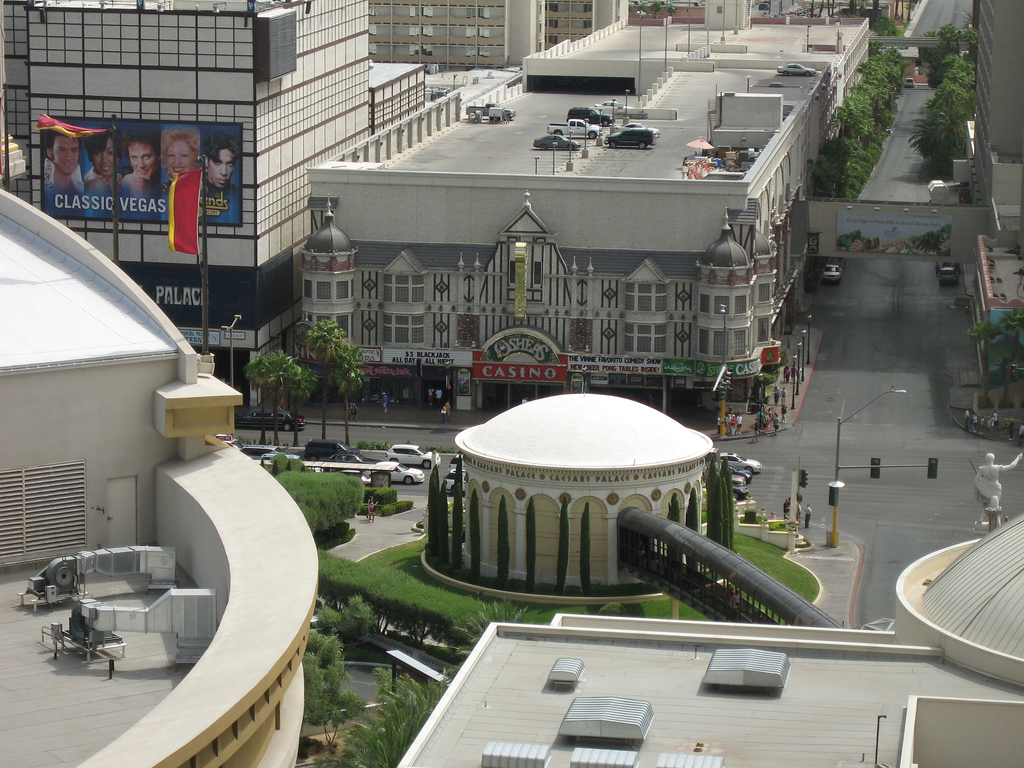
Aerial view, 2007

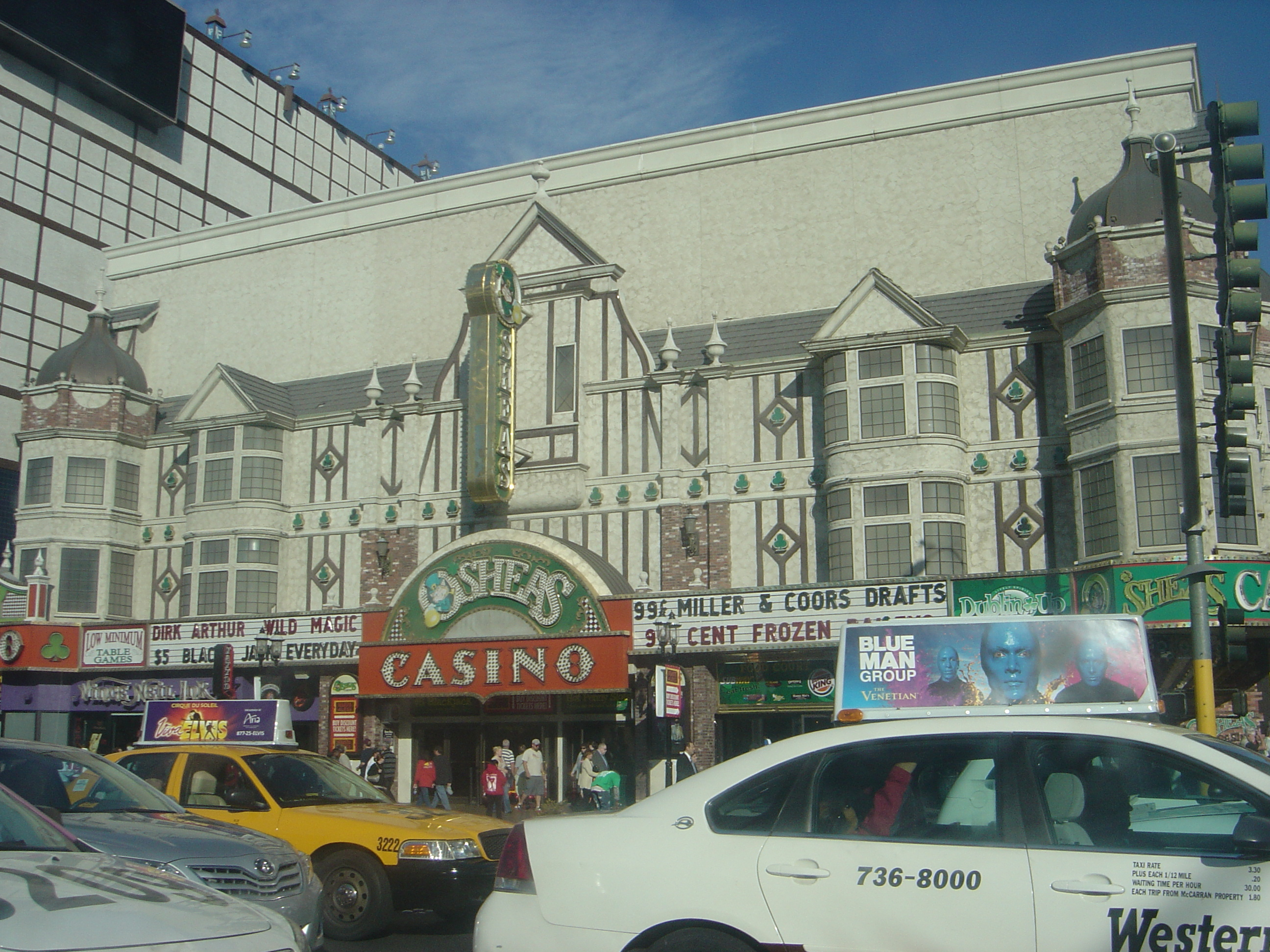
O'Sheas Casino in 2011

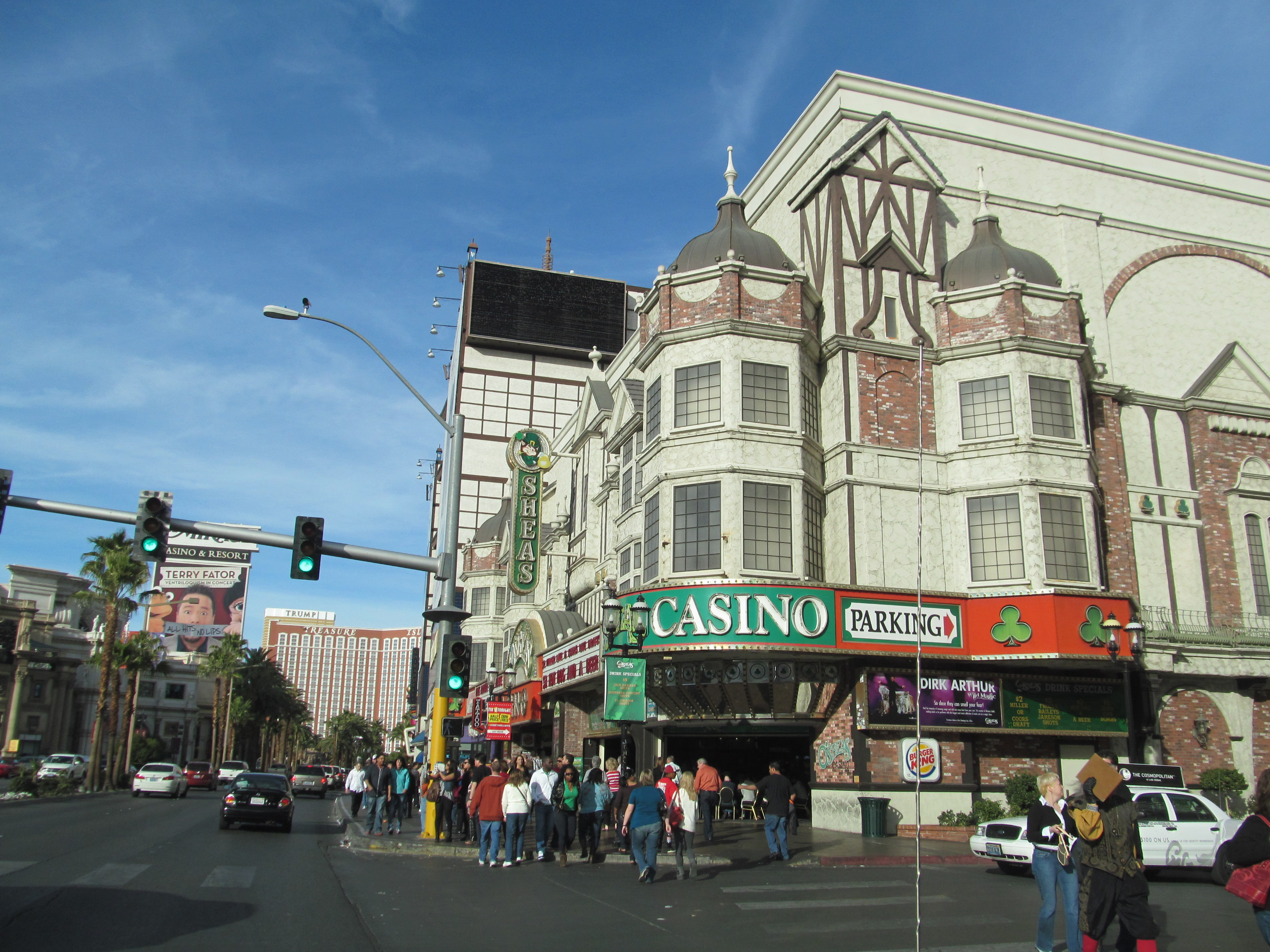
O'Sheas Casino in 2012

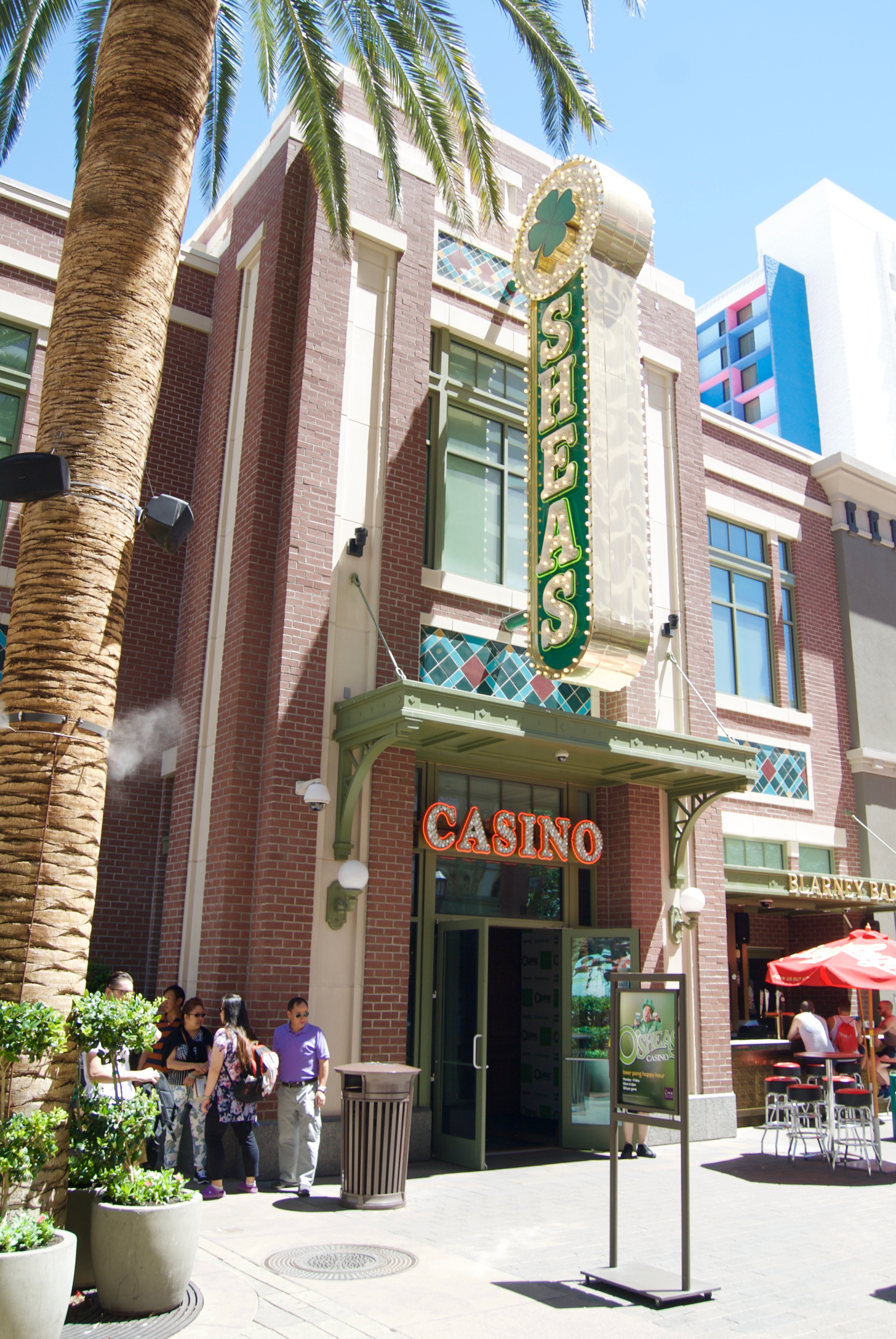
The new O'Sheas in 2016
