= Jeff Civillico =

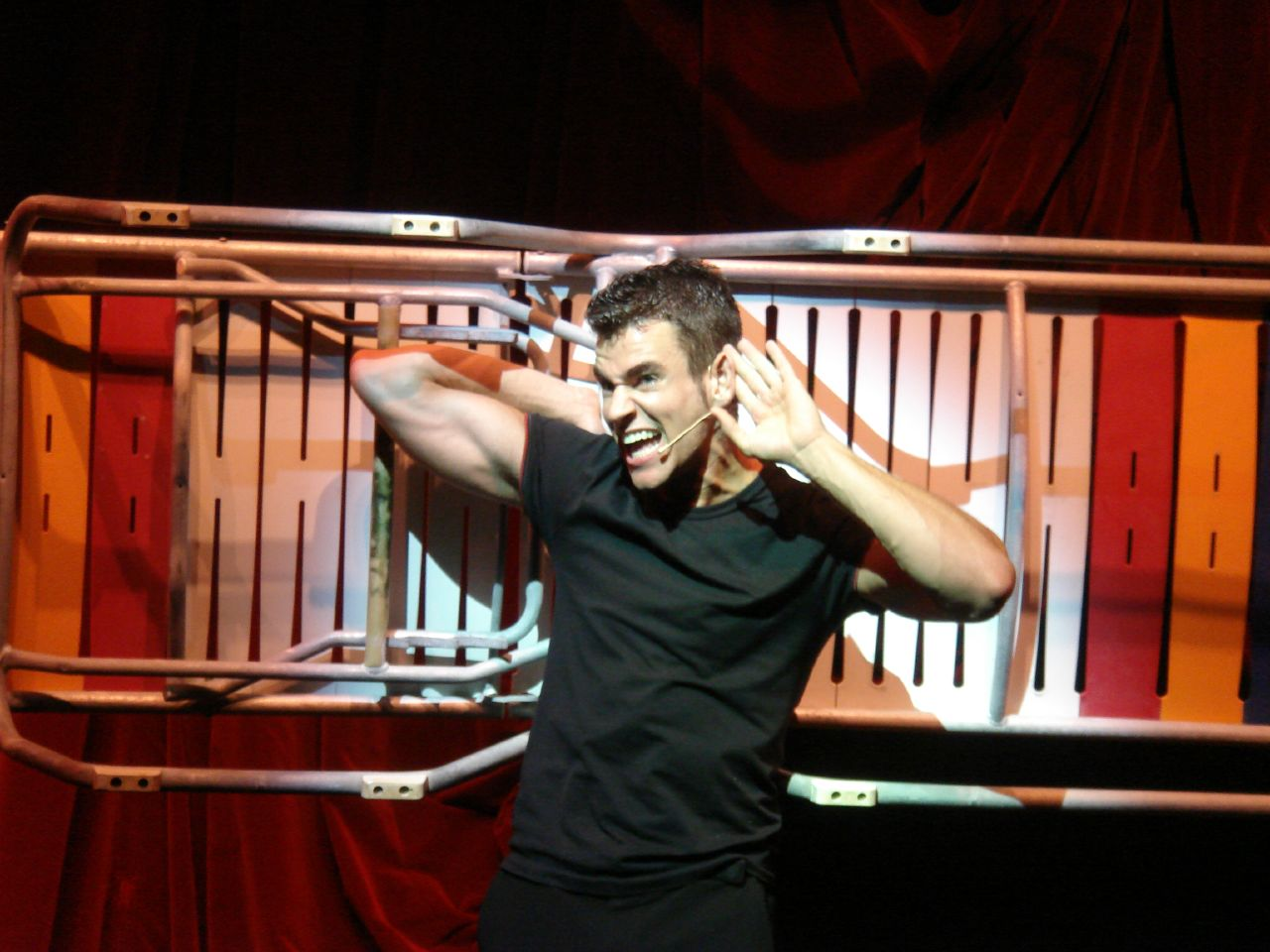
- Jeff Civillico performing on Disney Cruises on March 16, 2007
- Born: May 17, 1983 (age 42)
- Occupations: Juggler, corporate entertainer, and comedian

Jeff Civillico (born May 17, 1983) is a juggler, corporate entertainer, comedian, and philanthropist. Based in Las Vegas, he headlined the comedy show Comedy in Action at the Paris Las Vegas casino from 2012 to 2019 and was a guest performer at Nathan Burton's magic show. He is the founder of the charity Win-Win Entertainment.

Raised in Drexel Hill, Pennsylvania, Civillico became enamored with juggling after seeing a street performer in Boston when he was 11 years old. In his freshman year of high school, he founded the Juggling Club at Saint Joseph's Preparatory School, where he and other members would perform for free at nearby nursing homes and at a school for developmentally disabled children and young adults. In 1998 when he was 15, Civillico received a gold medal from the International Jugglers' Association, where he had competed in the junior division. He matriculated to Georgetown University, where he participated in the all-male a cappella group The Georgetown Chimes, leading it in his senior year. He founded the Georgetown Performers' Union to allow fellow performing arts students to help each other. In 2005, he received a bachelor's degree in theology from the university.

Civillico moved to Las Vegas, Nevada, in 2009 to perform in the show Amazed. Although the show did not last, Civillico remained in Las Vegas and landed a performing engagement at Nathan Burton's magic show. After about a year being a guest on Burton's show, he started his own show, Comedy in Action, produced by Burton, at a 100-seat venue at Planet Hollywood restaurant in the Forum Shops at Caesars Palace. Civillico later moved to The Linq, previously The Quad, at a 700-seat venue. He most recently moved to Flamingo Las Vegas. Reviewers of Comedy in Action generally had positive impressions of his show, praising him for his seemingly boundless energy, his ability to engage the audience, his prowess with making comical off-the-cuff remarks, and his juggling talent. He ended his show at Flamingo Las Vegas in 2019 to focus on his non-profit organization Win-Win Entertainment which connects entertainers with disadvantaged children.

== Personal life ==
Jeff Civillico was born on May 17, 1983 to Nicholas and Francine Civillico of Drexel Hill, Pennsylvania, and was the youngest of their three sons. His older brothers are John and Gene. He is from a family of doctors. His father is a dentist. One of his brothers is a doctor while the other is a neurobiologist who received a doctorate from Harvard University and works at the National Institutes of Health. For his pre-secondary education, Civillico attended Holy Child Academy in Drexel Hill, Pennsylvania, graduating from it in 1997, and Saint Joseph's Preparatory School in Philadelphia, graduating from it in 2001. As co-president of Holy Child Academy's student council in 1996 during the school's fundraising effort to assist those with HIV/AIDS, he urged fellow students and student groups such as the band and the choir to spend time with afflicted individuals. He started learning to juggling three balls when he was seven years old. His brother showed him how to juggle after consulting a book their parents purchased Civillico because he was curious about juggling. His grandmother was the audience for Civillico's first performance. As a gift after his Catholic Confirmation, he received three machetes.

When he was 11, he and his family visited his brother, Gene, who was attending Harvard University. During the visit, he was entranced by a street performer, juggler Peter Panic, at Harvard Square and vowed to become an entertainer. Selected by Peter Panic as a volunteer, Civillico found himself facing a large group of people, a feeling he said was "one of those defining moments". His parents gave him the book Juggling for Complete Klutz from Klutz Press, prompting him to begin honing his juggling skills. He joined the Philadelphia Juggling Club, which taught him some of the more challenging juggling tricks such as juggling five balls and passing clubs. The club practiced Monday nights on the steps of the Philadelphia Museum of Art. In the summer before ninth grade, Civillico competed at the International Jugglers' Association Convention in Pittsburgh and was ranked 14 out of 21 performers who were younger than 18.

Civillico founded the Juggling Club at Saint Joseph's Prep in 1997 when he was a freshman and performed with other members for free at local nursing homes. As a 15-year-old in 1998, Civillico earned a gold medal from the International Jugglers' Association after he competed in the junior division. Upon winning the medal, a person volunteered to serve as Civillico's agent and have him perform in Las Vegas, but Civillico declined since he wanted to stay in school. His parents told him that "juggling comes second to school" and he was forbidden from doing shows on school nights. With the stage name "Juggling Jeff Civillico", he worked in the summer of 1999 as a street performer at Baltimore's Inner Harbor. In a March 2000 interview with the Delaware County Daily Times, Civillico noted that many people his age were as skilled as he at juggling. He distinguished himself from the others by considering himself not to be a juggler but primarily an entertainer or a performer, someone with a sense of humor. As a 16-year-old in the 11th grade, his juggling act included a six-foot-tall unicycle and revolving plates. For his balancing routine, he used "rings, flaming torches, devil sticks, scarves and peacock feathers". In his trick with a 12-pound bowling ball, an apple, and a machete, he threw all three objects in the air, slashing the apple at the trick's end. In February 2000, he juggled for developmentally disabled children at Archdiocese of Philadelphia's Don Guanella School, where he is a frequent volunteer. He taught a student that the key to learning to balance a peacock feather was daily practice. The summer before 12th grade, he scored a job at Busch Gardens in Williamsburg, Virginia, as a street performer. With Sean McKelvey, his best friend and fellow student at Saint Joseph's Prep, he was hired to do six shows daily from June 25–August 15 and September 1–4. He performed at Busch Gardens for two more summers and in a subsequent year performed at a 900-seat theater there. In March 2001, Civillico organized a benefit show for Philadelphia's Gesu Elementary School. In high school, Civillico listed drama as his primary extracurricular activity and saxophone, piano, guitar, and choir as secondary activities.

At Georgetown University in Washington, D.C., Civillico was deeply connected to the university's growing performing arts program. He was a member of The Georgetown Chimes, an all-male a cappella group. During his final year at the university, he served as the group's leader. He also founded the Georgetown Performers' Union, where students involved in performing arts could meet and assist each other in practicing. He also co-founded the Georgetown Props, a juggling club, at the university. In 2005, Civillico received a bachelor's degree in theology from the university. In 2011, he served as the president of the Georgetown University Alumni Club of Las Vegas.

In a bid to raise $5000 for the special needs non-profit organization Special Kids, he participated on January 11, 2009, in the Walt Disney World Marathon for Team A.S.K. (Athletes for Special Kids). He simultaneously jogged 26.2 miles (42.2 km) and juggled three balls, in a sport commonly known as joggling. In the marathon's 16-year history, he was considered to be the first participant to joggle the full distance. In 2013, Civillico raised $10,000 from his friends to participate in the Special Olympics Nevada charity event Over the Edge, which required a minimum donation of $1,000 for participants to rappel down the 350-foot tall Planet Hollywood building. In October 2013, he was the host of Caesars Got Talent, a fundraising event held to benefit Opportunity Village, a Las Vegas non-profit organization that serves the intellectually disabled. Stephen Ruiz of the Orlando Sentinel noted that if Civillico had applied his theology degree, he would not likely have done the marathon. Civillico said:

A lot of parents say theoretically, 'You have to do what you love.' But they want their sons and daughters to go into professions that are well-defined and you have to jump through certain hoops -- doctors, lawyers. And there is nothing wrong with that. My parents said, 'You have to do what you love', and meant it.

Civillico is a member of the Tri-Junkies in Celebration, a triathlon association. Regarding his passion, he said that "juggling was the perfect combination of art and sport. It requires you to be in shape, but you can be creative. The air is your canvas."

== Career ==
When he was 18 years old, he accepted an offer to perform for 50 minutes on a cruise ship that began boarding passengers in Cartagena, Colombia. Because his parents were worried about his security, his older brother accompanied him. No one from the cruise line met them in Cartagena and their luggage had been taken by the Colombian drug cartel. His luggage had contained juggling props from his youth. Among the lost items were the juggling clubs he had used to win a gold medal from the International Jugglers' Association in 1998 in the junior division. Civillico and his brother were stuck in Cartagena with just Spanglish and stress. They stayed at several hotels and were able to board the ship in Manta, Ecuador, without getting harmed. Having lost his luggage, Civillico did not have the performing objects he had planned to use in his show. He had three days to create a different show by finding things on the ship he could use to juggle. He used watermelons and cantaloupes instead of bean ags. He used pool deckchairs instead of juggling clubs to hold in equilibrium on his chin.

In 2008, Civillico performed at Modesto's Gallo Center for the Arts, in what journalist Lisa Millegan of The Modesto Bee termed a "special brand of kinetic comedy with juggling, balancing and unicycling". Hollywood's The Magic Castle founder Milt Larsen said Civillico was one of the greatest jugglers he has encountered. He juggled an ax, a rubber chicken, a Shake Weight, a Furby, and a torch with fire during the show.

A January 2009 article in the Orlando Sentinel noted that Civillico performed 200 times every year for Disney Cruise Line and at numerous corporate occasions. He has performed at the White House and the Kennedy Center, as well as at Atlantis Paradise Island at Nassau, Bahamas. Civillico has performed in Springfield, Illinois; Modesto, California; Springdale, Arkansas; Mohegan Sun Arena, Connecticut; and Tampa, Florida. He has also led "team-building" seminars for Wachovia, OSHA, Anheuser-Busch, Harley-Davidson, and Honda. Civillico is the marketing director for the Las Vegas chapter of the National Speakers Association.

In 2009, Civillico traveled to Las Vegas, Nevada, to entertain people in the ephemeral show Amazed. He remained in Las Vegas and landed a 12-minute specialty act at Nathan Burton's magic show. According to Civillico, audience members found his performance so memorable that they asked Burton and Civillico whether Civillico had his own show. Based on this feedback, the two found a location for Civillico at the Planet Hollywood restaurant located in the Forum Shops at Caesars Palace. Relying primarily on advertising from Burton's show and having nearly no paid promotion, Civillico's show drew nearly capacity crowds for the 120-seat venue. Civillico emphasized in an interview that his show was not merely about juggling but "all about the connection with the audience and the fun, playful character".

In 2020, during the COVID-19 Pandemic, Civillico pivoted to virtual events as an emcee, including hosting a virtual fundraiser for the American Heart Association.

Jeff Civillico: Comedy in Action is a 2026 documentary-comedy film chronicling the entertainment career of performer Jeff Civillico, combining stand-up comedy with behind-the-scenes documentary footage. The film follows Civillico’s decade of headlining performances in Las Vegas, featuring his physical comedy, audience interactions, and reflections on the challenges of building a live show. It is available on streaming platforms including Apple TV, Amazon Prime Video, Google Play, and YouTube TV.

=== Comedy in Action ===
His show, Comedy in Action, was transplanted to The Quad (then called the Imperial Palace) on May 26, 2012. Civillico initially continued to perform at Burton's magic show where his show was promoted. After Burton, Comedy in Action's first producer, moved from Caesars Entertainment to Saxe Theater in Miracle Mile Shops in October 2012, Civillico began producing his own show. When the show began, Civillico said, "You know you're a big deal in Vegas when you do your own introduction." For the first six months, Comedy in Action was a one-man show; Civillico had no assistants or showgirls with him. In December 2012, Alonzo "Turf" Jones, a hip-hop dancing contortionist who competed on America's Got Talent's seventh season, became Civillico's opening act. Jones and Civillico teamed up as opener and headliner following Jones' performance at a Win-Win Entertainment charity event Civillico hosted.

Las Vegas Review-Journal's Mike Weatherford in a June 2012 review called Civillico's early act in the show "one of the most memorable bits". Civillico selects two male volunteers from the audience ("two strong beasts of men") to assist him to mount his unicycle. Weatherford described the act as the "dudes (and it would only work with guys) become uncomfortably familiar with both the front and back of Civillico's crotch, before they all help each other mouth-catch marshmallows". Weatherford was awed at Civillico's "agility as well as the speed of ad-lib". After a marshmallow ricocheted off the stage, an audience member grabbed it and flung it into Civillico's jaws. Civillico said, "You just got his DVD", and gave the audience member the DVD present that was originally going to be given to the fumbling volunteer.

In an August 2012 review in the weekly magazine Today in Las Vegas, reviewer Christina M. Parmelee found that Civillico "feeds on the reluctant and uses that for his comedic fodder", converting the "most uptight audience member [into] a die-hard fan at the end". Parmelee noted that Civillico's "remarkable rapport" with the audience is essential to executing a successful show; he relies on participants from the audience to make the shows "personal and memorable". She concluded that "[e]njoying every minute as a headliner in Las Vegas, Civillico thrives on the chance to just be his ridiculous self." When a boy urinated in his pants during the show, Civillico, inspired by the comedy film Billy Madison, said, "I pee myself all the time. That’s why I always wear black."

VEGAS.com reviewer Caroline Fontein said that Civillico's "self-deprecating humor makes him both relatable and amusing". She praised his juggling skills, writing that he juggles "glow-in-the-dark laser balls and pins" that morph into a variety of colors, generating the optical illusion that he has two pairs of hands. Fontein also commented that Civillico's "high side kick followed by an exaggerated wedgie pull" comprised some of his "odd signature moves", making him the "definition of zany" and generating an enjoyable spectacle. Today in Las Vegas reviewer Laura Damian wrote in February 2013 that he has "the energy of a hummingbird and the comedic timing of a veteran street performer" and "has a way of seamlessly integrating members of his audience into his show in a way that's original, charming and hilarious". In 2013, Comedy in Action was selected by USA Today as one of the "Best of Las Vegas Kid-Friendly Attractions". Reviewer Hilary Billings wrote in USA Today: "Praise to Jeff for not only mesmerizing little humans with his mad juggling skills, but for giving the parental units something to laugh about."

In August 2012, Civillico used the tools of crowdsourcing and the Internet to persuade his fans to donate to his $10,900 "The People's Arch" project. Designed by Andy Walmsley, the 20 feet (6.1 m) high by 40 feet (12 m) wide inflatable arch was intended as his show's centerpiece. In the opening act, the arch explodes out of a flight case and in 20 seconds swells to its entire breadth. He subsequently added more technology to his show such as "fire effects, projection screens", and a before show piece involving Skype. Civillico debuted "Juggle-Vision" in June 2014 in which he mounted a GoPro camera on himself to allow viewers to see on a screen what juggling looked like from his perspective.

The pilot episode of Civillico's proposed show on Travel Channel, Vegas Strip Search, aired on April 6, 2013. During the episode, he visited four locations, namely Calgary, Alberta, Canada (where he met a fire eater), Texas (where he met Adam Crack, a whipcracker), New Jersey (where he met a pogo-sticker), and Pennsylvania (where he met a chainsaw carver). The act he selected, the Texas whipcracker, performed in both Vegas Strip Search and his Las Vegas show Comedy in Action. A week after the pilot episode aired, the Travel Channel told the Vegas Seven that based on the ratings they were continuing to deliberate on whether to make Vegas Strip Search a series.

Civillico tore his meniscus and had knee surgery in late October 2016. He had completed his 923rd show when he went on hiatus while recovering from his injury. He planned to return to Flamingo Las Vegas on February 6, 2016, to perform his show. After recuperating from his shoulder and knee surgeries, on November 8, 2017, he returned to entertaining. He performed at Paris Las Vegas at the Anthony Cools Showroom for one show per week. The one-show-a-week arrangement was an atypical schedule on the Las Vegas Strip that Civillico requested to accommodate his having a significant number of performance requests from companies and private people. Author Bob Sehlinger in the book The Unofficial Guide to Las Vegas 2017 called Civillico "a world class juggler with insane energy and a wit quicker than that of most stand-up comics" and said Civillico "performs at a blistering, almost manic, pace while bantering with the audience". In a 2019 review of the show, Las Vegas Sun reviewer Brock Radke praised Civillico for "charm[ing] children and seniors, parents and the party set, with nonstop one-liners, seamless skills and a goofy yet self-aware style reminiscent of Jim Carrey". Civillico performed his final show at Paris Las Vegas on December 18, 2019. Despite having signed a contract in 2019 with Caesars Entertainment to perform for another two years, Civillico ended his "Comedy In Action" show because he wanted to focus more on his non-profit organization Win-Win Entertainment and on performing at corporate shows.

=== Win Win Charity ===
Civillico is a philanthropist. He founded the non-profit organization Win Win Charity (Formally Win Win Entertainment), which matches charity organizations in want of amusement with entertainers wanting to give their time. Non-profit organizations find it difficult to have good entertainment at their fundraising events. They are stymied by the prohibitive cost of recruiting good entertainers. In addition, entertainers may be hesitant to perform for non-profit organizations. Inadequate equipment stemming from limited resources may prevent them from performing at their finest. Win Win Charity addresses the problems by acquiring and setting up the stage, sound system, and other equipment necessary for the performer who in return performs for free. By November 2013, Win Win Charity had hosted 25 events for charities. By August 2015, it had hosted 250 events for the year, averaging about three to five a week.

The organizations helped by Win Win Charity include the American Cancer Society, The Shade Tree Shelter, St. Jude's Ranch for Children, Nevada Partnership for Homeless Youth, and the Lili Claire Foundation. It helps non-profit organizations with obtaining show tickets and performers' merchandise to sell at silent auctions.

The organization's second annual fundraiser, "The Headliner Bash 2013", was hosted by the John C. Kish Foundation. Performers and groups participating in the fundraiser included singer and impressionist Véronic DiCaire of Véronic Voices, American Idol's Taylor Hicks, comedy magician Mac King, Divas Las Vegas' Frank Marino, "junk rock" band Recycled Percussion, pop vocal group Human Nature, the Kristef Brothers, and the Las Vegas casts of the musicals Jersey Boys and Million Dollar Quartet. Win Win Charity organizes multiple shows a week at children's hospitals and other places serving disadvantaged youth. The organization focuses on hospitals on Wednesdays and hosts "Twilight Thursday" shows at senior centers. It collaborates with the United Service Organizations at Nellis Air Force Base and Creech Air Force Base and with Miracle League of Las Vegas during the spring on Saturdays for baseball with special-needs kids. In 2019, the non-profit organization operated in Las Vegas, Minneapolis, New York City, Orange County, California, Orlando, Florida; Phoenix, Arizona; and Reno, Nevada.

=== Other ventures ===
Civillico became a celebrity spokesman for Las Vegas Natural History Museum in 2018 and is the museum's first brand ambassador. He helped increase recognition for the museum and create new events for it. After ending his "Comedy in Action" show, Civillico performed at corporate events nationwide. During the COVID-19 pandemic, Civillico held free weekly juggling classes on Zoom and Instagram. During the pandemic, he performed as a master of ceremonies at online events for companies. He performed magic tricks to the hundreds of people watching him online during the events and had confetti during a June 2020 show requested by the American Heart Association, which had raised enough funds to meet its set target.

=== Social media ===
Civillico has 10,000 Twitter followers on his @jeffcivillico account. He frequently networks with them and fans on his Comedy in Action Facebook page. The Las Vegas Sun's Ron Sylvester wrote in December 2012 that Civillico had received "top reviews" from Yelp and TripAdvisor.
