= Legends in Concert =

Legends in Concert is a live tribute artist production with shows located primarily in Las Vegas, Nevada; Myrtle Beach, South Carolina; Branson, Missouri; and Waikiki, Hawaii. Legends in Concert features live concerts paying tribute to musical icons of the past and present. The performers resemble and sing like the original artists while being backed by a live band and dancers. Performances are scheduled year round across the globe and its five primary locations in the United States.

The show has been running since its debut at the Imperial Palace on May 5, 1983, the longest running show in Las Vegas history.

It has received entertainment industry awards "Show of the Year", "Entertainers of the Year", "Grand Slam" and "Show of Shows" awarded by the International Press Association.

Each performer looks like the star they portray, and uses their own natural voice to pay homage to their iconic music subject. Legends in Concert live tribute shows are known by some for their theatrical sets, costumes, full array of special effects, including three dimensional multimedia and multimillion-dollar, lighting and sound systems.

== History ==
Legends in Concert was founded in 1983 in Las Vegas, Nevada. During that same year, Legends' first show was performed at the Imperial Palace Hotel and Casino in Las Vegas, Nevada. The show is currently owned and produced by On Stage Entertainment, Inc. 2023 marked the 40th Anniversary for Legends in Concert entertainment productions.

The Legends in Concert show has expanded its production to The Legends in Concert Theater in Myrtle Beach, Branson, Missouri; the Norwegian Epic; Blue Chip Casino, Hotel and Spa in Michigan City, Indiana; Coushatta Casino in Kinder, Louisiana; Royal Hawaiian Center in Waikiki, Hawaii; Foxwoods Resort Casino in Mashantucket, Connecticut and Bally's Atlantic City in Atlantic City, New Jersey.

In 2013, Legends in Concert furthered its partnership with Elvis Presley Enterprises, Inc. a joint venture, full-scale touring production presenting a US national tour called Elvis Lives. The tour presents the music of Elvis throughout the many phases of his career in a live concert featuring 4 Elvis tribute artists.

The pilot production of Legends in Concert in Las Vegas, Nevada, moved from its original location at the Imperial Palace and Hotel Casino to Harrah's Las Vegas on February 23, 2009. In February 2013, Legends in Concert moved to The Flamingo Las Vegas.

Legends has begun experimenting with international performances. As of 2016, Legends had touring performances, but no permanent international venues.

These are some milestones in the history of the show:

- 1983: premieres in Las Vegas.
- 1988: premieres in Atlantic City, NJ.
- 1989: premieres on Broadway (first Las Vegas show to do so).
- 1993: premieres in Hawaii on Waikiki Beach at the Royal Hawaiian Theater.
- 1994: premieres in Myrtle Beach, SC, operating year-round.
- 1995: premieres in Branson, MO, operating continuously since then.
- 1996: premieres in Melbourne, Australia.
- 2009: premieres aboard Norwegian Cruise Line.
- 2009: opens at Foxwoods Resort & Casino, becoming the longest-running show at the venue.
- 2010: premieres at Fallsview Resort in Niagara Falls.

== Awards ==
- 2007 Tribute Show of the Year
- 2004, 2005 Celebrity Impersonation Show of The Year
- March 15–20, 2004, proclaimed as "Legends in Concert Week" in honor of the theater's 10th anniversary
- 2009, 2010 voted Best Live Music Venue by WMBF-TV Viewers – Myrtle Beach, SC.
- 2011 voted 3rd Place Best Live Music Venue Myrtle Beach, South Carolina by WMBF-TV viewers
- 2014 Voted Best Tribute Show Las Vegas Review Journal
- 2018 Voted Best Casino Entertainment Global Gaming Expo
- Ranked top 10 Best Music Shows Readers' Choice Poll
