= The Linq =

Casino hotel in Paradise, Nevada

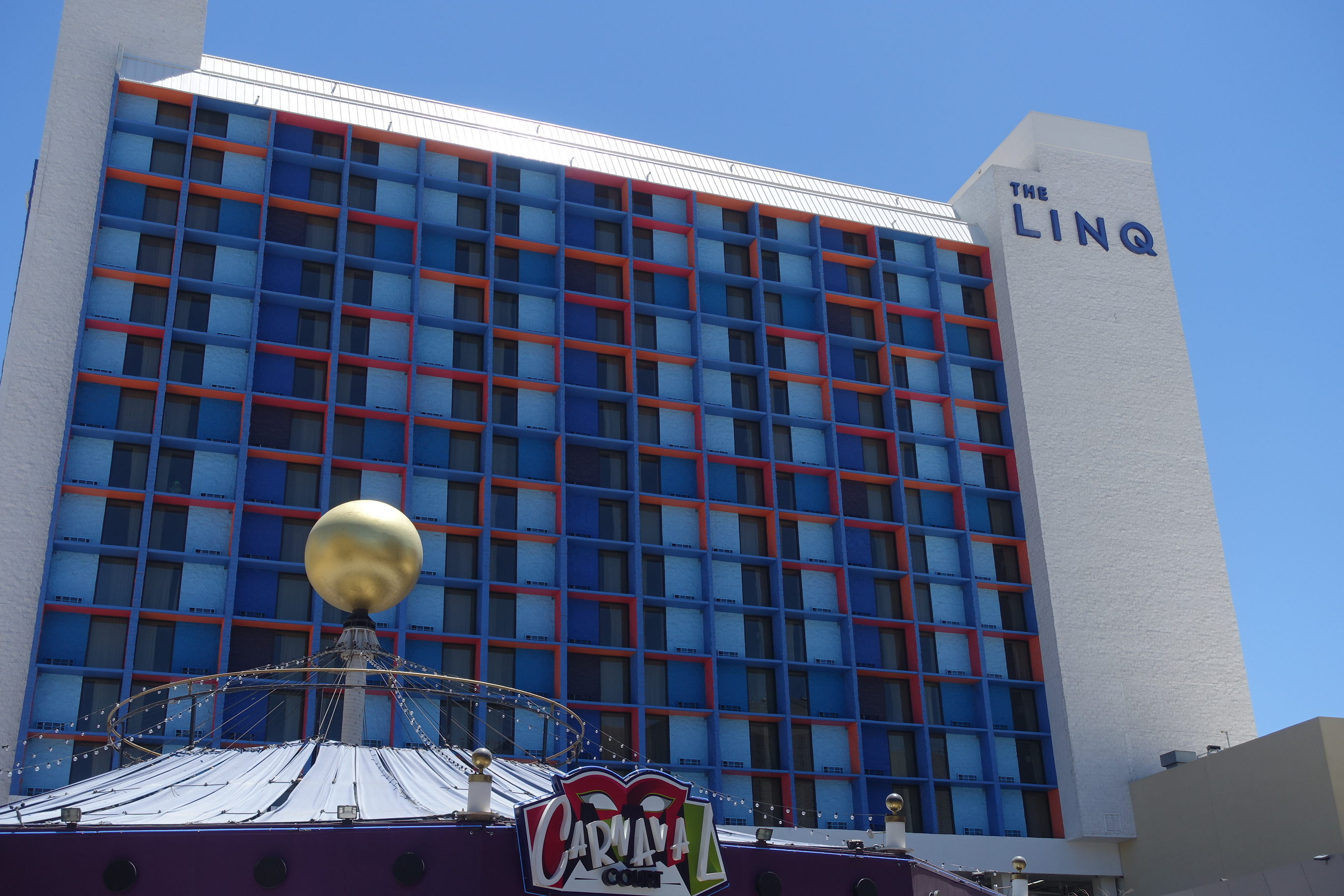
- The Linq in 2017

- Location within Las Vegas Strip Location within Nevada Location within the United States
- Interactive map of The Linq
- Location: Paradise, Nevada, U.S.; 3535 South Las Vegas Boulevard; 36°07′03″N 115°10′22″W
- Opened: October 30, 1959; 66 years ago
- Theme: Orientalism (as Imperial Palace)
- No. of rooms: 2,250
- Gaming space: 33,890 sq ft (3,148 m^{2})
- Permanent shows: Legends in Concert (1983–2009); Divas Las Vegas (2010–18); Mat Franco: Magic Reinvented Nightly
- Signature attractions: High Roller; Mat Franco Theater; The Auto Collections (1981–2017); The Linq Promenade; O'Sheas Casino; Brooklyn Bowl
- Casino type: Land-based
- Owner: Caesars Entertainment
- Architect: Merlin J. Barth (Imperial Palace)
- Previous names: Flamingo Capri (1959–1979); Imperial Palace (1979–2012); The Quad (2012–2014)
- Renovated in: 1972, 1974, 1977, 1981–82, 1985–86, 1987–89, 2012–13, 2014–15, 2018
- Website: caesars.com/linq

The Linq (formerly Flamingo Capri, Imperial Palace and The Quad) is a casino hotel on the Las Vegas Strip in Paradise, Nevada. It is owned and operated by Caesars Entertainment. It opened as the Flamingo Capri on October 30, 1959, on property located directly north of the original Flamingo resort. The Flamingo Capri was a 180-room motel, owned by George E. Goldberg and Flamingo employee Bill Capri.

Ralph Engelstad purchased the Flamingo Capri in 1971, and added a casino the following year. He built additional motel buildings in 1974, and eventually added the 19-story Imperial Palace Tower in 1977. Engelstad renamed the entire property the Imperial Palace on November 1, 1979, when a new casino facility opened on the site. The Flamingo Capri's casino was demolished to make way for the Imperial Palace's entrance, although some of the motel rooms would remain in operation for decades. The Imperial Palace was the first Asian-themed resort on the Strip. It was popular among middle-class and value-conscious guests. Long-running attractions included The Auto Collections, a car museum that operated from 1981 to 2017; and Legends in Concert, a show that ran from 1983 to 2009.

Engelstad added additional hotel towers from 1982 to 1987, increasing the room count to 2,637. It was among the largest hotels in the world. When Engelstad died in 2002, the Imperial Palace was the second-largest privately owned hotel in the world, behind the Venetian resort in Las Vegas. Following his death, operations were taken over by a group that included his wife Betty. Harrah's Entertainment (later known as Caesars Entertainment) purchased the Imperial Palace in 2005, for $370 million. The company considered partial or complete demolition of the resort, before deciding on a renovation instead. On December 21, 2012, Caesars renamed the resort The Quad. The Asian theme was removed, and the property received a redesign.

The Linq Promenade – an outdoor collection of bars, restaurants, and retailers – was opened by Caesars in 2013. It was built along the Quad's southern edge. A signature feature of the promenade is the High Roller Ferris wheel, the second tallest in the world, only behind the Ain Dubai Ferris wheel. The Quad was renamed The Linq on October 30, 2014, to match the new promenade. The name change was accompanied by a $223 million renovation, which modernized the resort in an effort to attract a new demographic of millennials. The Linq includes a 33,890 sq ft (3,148 m^{2}) casino and 2,250 rooms.

== History ==
=== Flamingo Capri (1959–1979) ===
The property began as the $2-million, 180-room Flamingo Capri motel, owned by George E. Goldberg and Bill Capri. The motel was built directly north of the Flamingo Hotel and Casino, where Capri was an employee. The original Flamingo agreed to provide hotel services to guests at the Capri.

The motel began construction in May 1959, and opened on October 30 of that year. Douglas Honnold and John Rex, both of Beverly Hills, California, were the architects. Maurice N. Aroff of Beverly Hills was the general contractor. Capri departed the property soon after the opening, with Goldberg becoming the sole owner and operator. The Flamingo Capri Restaurant was added in 1964.

Ralph Engelstad purchased the motel in 1971, and added a casino in 1972. Prior to the addition of a casino, the motel had 250 employees. In 1973, four motel buildings from the Flamingo Capri were relocated and converted to become part of Engelstad's other property, the Kona Kai motel. Engelstad's construction company added a three-story wing at the east end of the motel, as well as a northern addition, both of which opened in 1974 along with the Shangri-la pool.

By 1976, the motel was being operated as part of the Best Western hotel chain, while retaining the Flamingo Capri name. An expansion project was underway in early 1977. It included the 19-story Imperial Palace Tower, which opened in July 1977, increasing the number of rooms from 300 to 650. A second phase of expansion began later in 1977, following the partial demolition of the Flamingo Capri motel. The expansion would include a new casino building and a showroom. There were plans to eventually rename the Flamingo Capri as the Imperial Palace. The Flamingo Capri's eastern motel structure continued operating for more than three decades under the Imperial Palace name.

=== Imperial Palace (1979–2012) ===
The name change to Imperial Palace took place on November 1, 1979, with the opening of the new casino building. Demolition simultaneously began on the Flamingo Capri's casino building, clearing way for the Imperial Palace's entrance, which was expected to be finished within a month. The number of employees increased to 1,000.

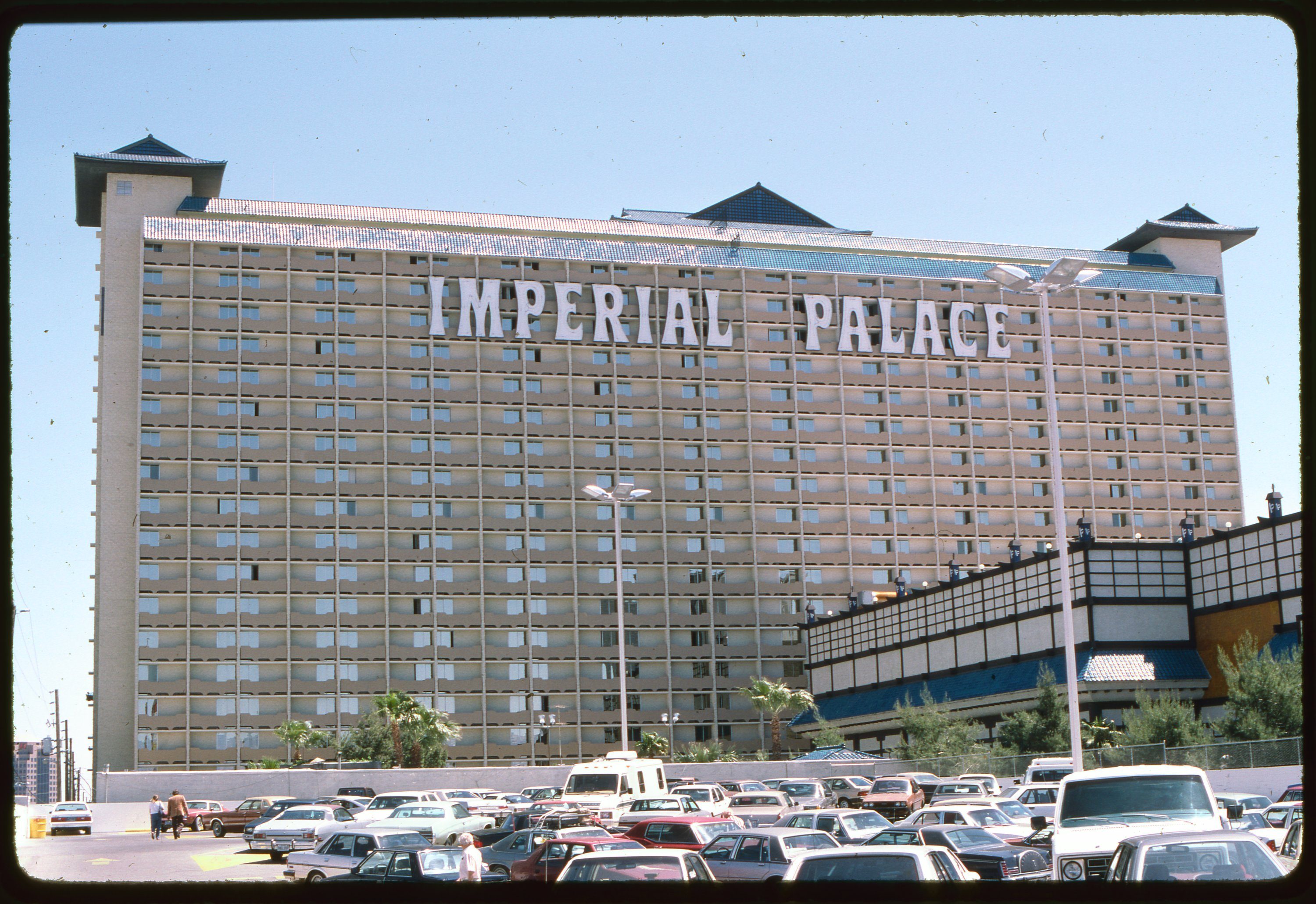
The Imperial Palace in 1987, before expanding closer to the Strip

Merlin J. Barth was the architect of the resort, which was themed after an Asian palace. Engelstad chose the Oriental theme for its uniqueness, as there were no other Asian-themed resorts on the Las Vegas Strip. Barth chose blue tile imported from Japan for the roof of the resort, having been influenced by Japanese temples. The interior heavily featured the Oriental theme as well, and included carved dragons and giant wind chime chandeliers. The Imperial Palace catered to a middle-class and value-conscious clientele throughout its history. The resort did little marketing, but still achieved high occupancy rates, due to its location on the Strip and its low room rates.

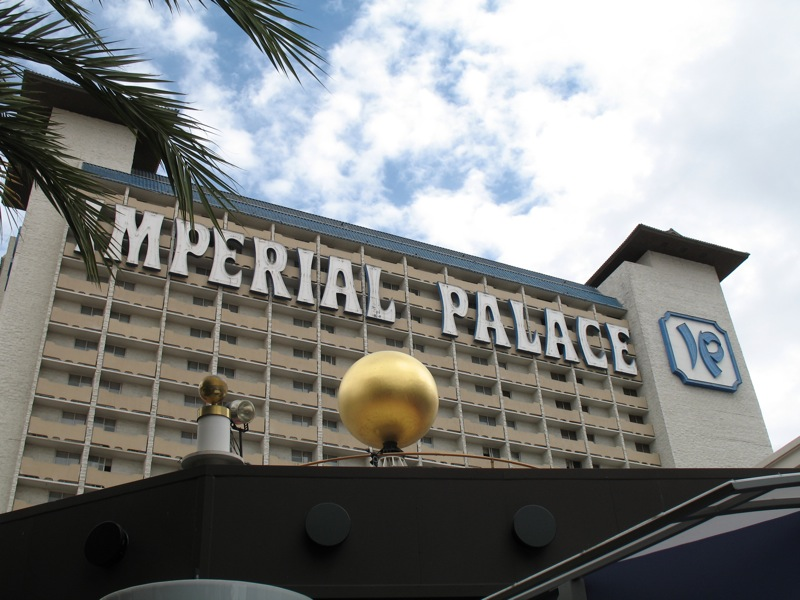
Imperial Palace tower facing the Strip, 2006

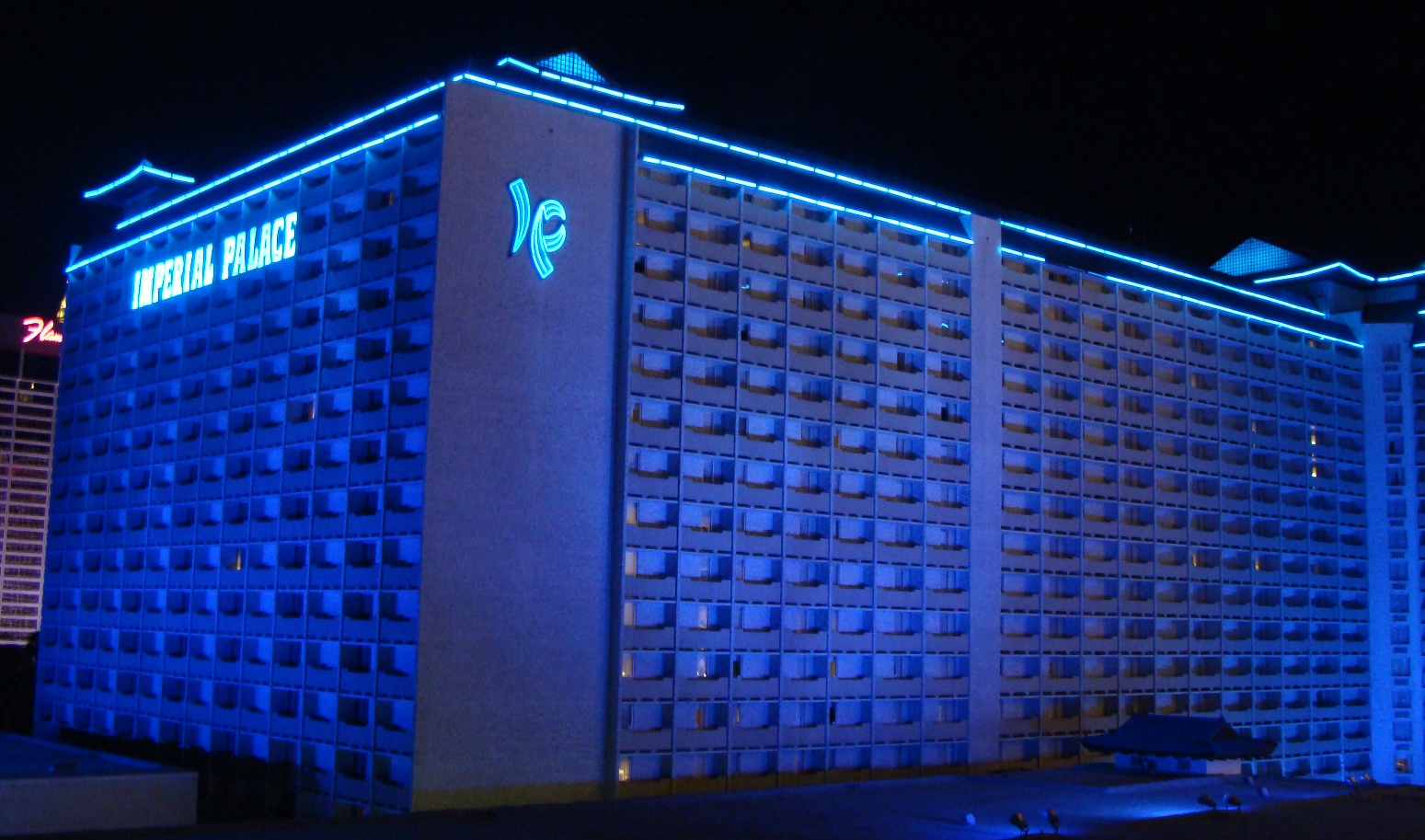
Hotel towers at night

At the time of opening, the resort included Court of a Thousand Treasures, a four-story shopping arcade with 60 stores, overlooking the east end of the 30,000 sq ft (2,800 m^{2}) casino. An automobile museum, The Auto Collections, opened in 1981. A 650-room hotel tower opened in August 1982, bringing the total room count to more than 1,500. By 1982, the shopping arcade included the free Imperial Palace School of Gaming, for gamblers who did not know how to play. The school operated as a mini casino overlooking the main 40,000 sq ft (3,700 m^{2}) casino. It later operated on the main casino floor.

During the 1980s, the resort served as the starting and finishing location of the annual Imperial Palace Antique Auto Run. In 1985, the parking garage was expanded to include more than 1,000 additional parking spaces, becoming one of the largest parking facilities in Las Vegas. In December 1985, the foundation was laid for a 560-room hotel addition, which was completed in 1986, bringing the room count total to 2,100. The Imperial Palace became the seventh largest hotel in the world, and had more than 2,200 employees. The casino was expanded by 15,000 square feet (1,400 m^{2}), and convention facilities were increased from 25,000 sq ft (2,300 m^{2}) to 30,000 sq ft (2,800 m^{2}). A final hotel tower, standing 19 stories with 547 rooms, was completed in July 1987, bringing the total to 2,637 rooms. The tower was the former location of the resort's pool.

The Imperial Palace won several awards for its hiring of disabled people. Twice in the late 1980s, the Governor's Committee for the Handicapped named the Imperial Palace as "Employer of the Year". A few years later, the President's Committee on Employment of People with Disabilities named the Imperial Palace "National Employer of the Year". The resort subsequently offered listening devices in its showroom for hearing-impaired audience members.

A three-phase expansion began in August 1987 and concluded in July 1989. The three-phase expansion included the addition of a new Olympic-size swimming pool, a heated spa, and a poolside bar. The final phase of the expansion – including a race & sportsbook, and fitness center – extended the resort to the sidewalk along Las Vegas Boulevard. The sportsbook was completed in September 1989, and a drive-through option was created in 1991. Located on Koval Lane behind the hotel, the drive-through became popular among customers. During the 1990s, the sportsbook also gained a reputation for posting more futures and proposition wagers than any other Las Vegas sportsbook.

In the early 1990s, the resort launched a weekly series of luau parties known as Hawaiian Hot Luau. It offered a buffet of Asian food and performances by hula dancers and fire eaters. In 1993, the Imperial Palace added a medical center for its employees and their families, as well as tourists. By the end of the decade, the resort partnered with Reno Air to provide guests with baggage check-in at the hotel, ahead of outgoing flights.

==== Lawsuits and controversy ====
In 1984, a couple staying at the hotel were robbed, and the wife was also raped. They filed a security negligence lawsuit against the Imperial Palace, and later accused the resort of destroying records that were sought for the lawsuit. Casino executives later admitted to the destruction of such records. Several other lawsuits were filed during the mid-1980s, accusing the resort of sexual and religious discrimination.

In 1988, agents for the Nevada Gaming Control Board inspected the Imperial Palace and discovered that Engelstad had a "war room" there, containing a large collection of World War II Nazi memorabilia. Among the items was a portrait of Engelstad in the likeness of Adolf Hitler. The control board also found that Engelstad had hosted Nazi-themed parties at the war room in 1986 and 1988, celebrating Hitler's birthday. Following these revelations, state officials accused Engelstad of bringing discredit to Nevada and its gaming industry. He apologized for the parties and stated that the collection was purely of historical interest. Engelstad faced a possible revocation of his gaming license, but eventually agreed to pay a $1.5 million fine to the state, settling issues related to the Nazi controversy and the destruction of records. It was the second-largest fine in Nevada gaming history.

In 1997, the Equal Employment Opportunity Commission filed a sex discrimination lawsuit against the Imperial Palace, on behalf of six cocktail waitresses who worked there. The waitresses had become pregnant and their weight gain was considered unattractive by the resort, which gave them the option of taking lower-paying jobs or unpaid leave. The Imperial Palace eventually reached financial settlements with the women after three years.

James Grosjean, an advantage gambler, was briefly detained by Imperial Palace security in 2001. The Nevada Gaming Control Board viewed Grosjean as a person of interest, but later ordered that he be released. Despite the order, security continued to hold him for a period of time. Grosjean filed and eventually won a lawsuit against the Imperial Palace, alleging false imprisonment.

==== Final years ====
In the mid-1990s, Engelstad considered selling the Imperial Palace for $400–$500 million. At the time, the resort occupied 8.5 acres (3.4 ha), and Engelstad owned an additional 10 acres (4.0 ha) behind the resort. The casino measured 47,625 sq ft (4,424.5 m^{2}). As of 1997, the Imperial Palace was the 10th largest hotel in the world and the world's largest privately owned hotel. That year, Engelstad opened a second Imperial Palace in Biloxi, Mississippi. In 2000, Engelstad said that he would sell his properties in preparation for retirement. Analysts considered Harrah's Entertainment as a likely buyer for the Imperial Palace, given that the company's Harrah's Las Vegas resort was located on adjacent property.

Engelstad died of lung cancer in November 2002. At the time, the Imperial Palace was the second-largest privately owned hotel in the world, behind the Venetian resort in Las Vegas. The Imperial Palace had nearly 2,700 rooms and 2,600 employees. After Engelstad's death, his wife Betty oversaw operations with the help of his longtime attorney, his accountant, and the property's general manager. The four became co-trustees following Engelstad's death, and there were no immediate plans to sell the property, considering its popularity. In 2003, the casino added 600 new slot machines, and a monorail station was built, connecting with Harrah's Las Vegas.

In July 2004, an escalator fire sent smoke into the casino and upper-floor restaurants, forcing an evacuation. The fire caused $500,000 in damage, mostly to the escalator. The property reopened later that night, after two hours.

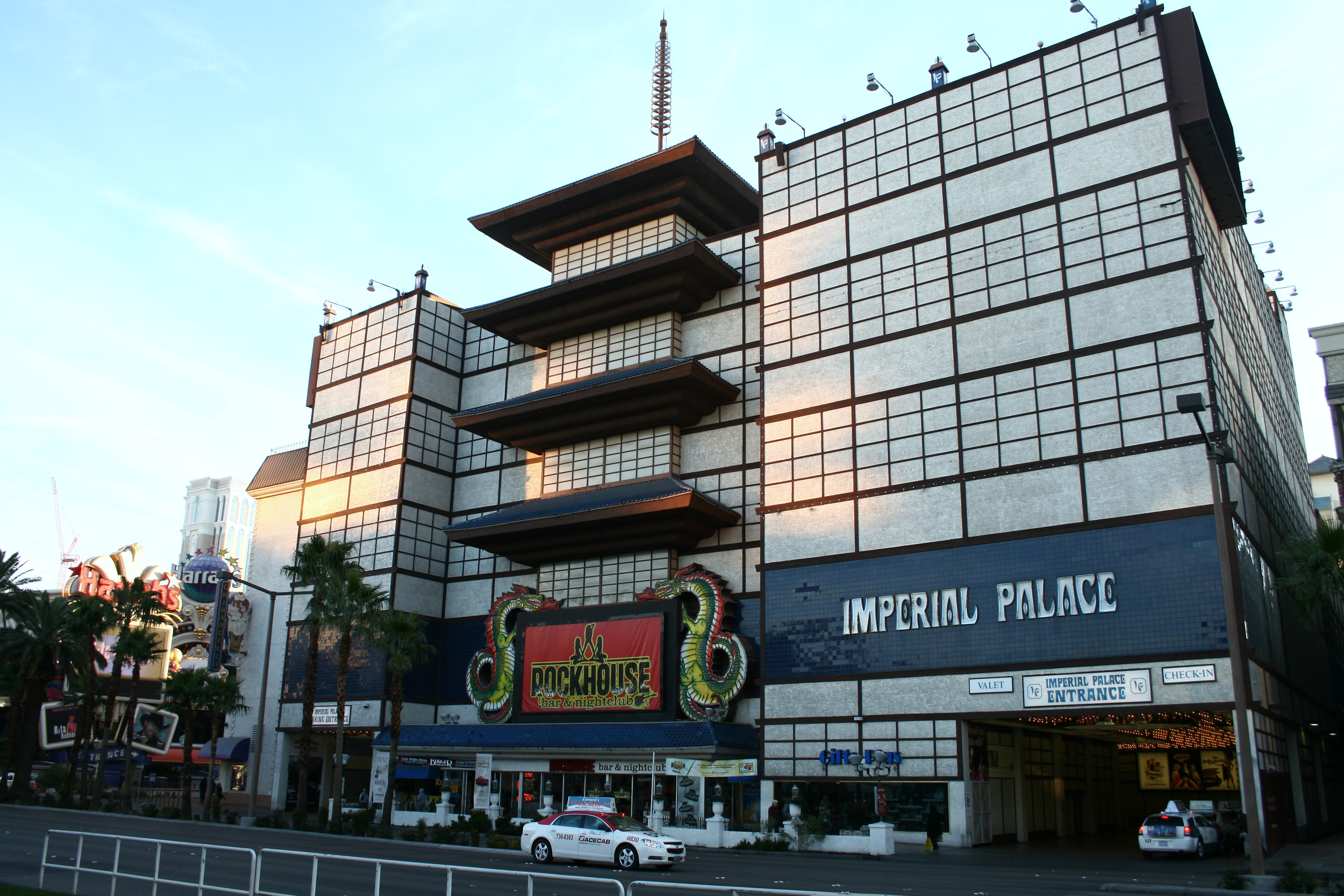
Imperial Palace façade in its final years

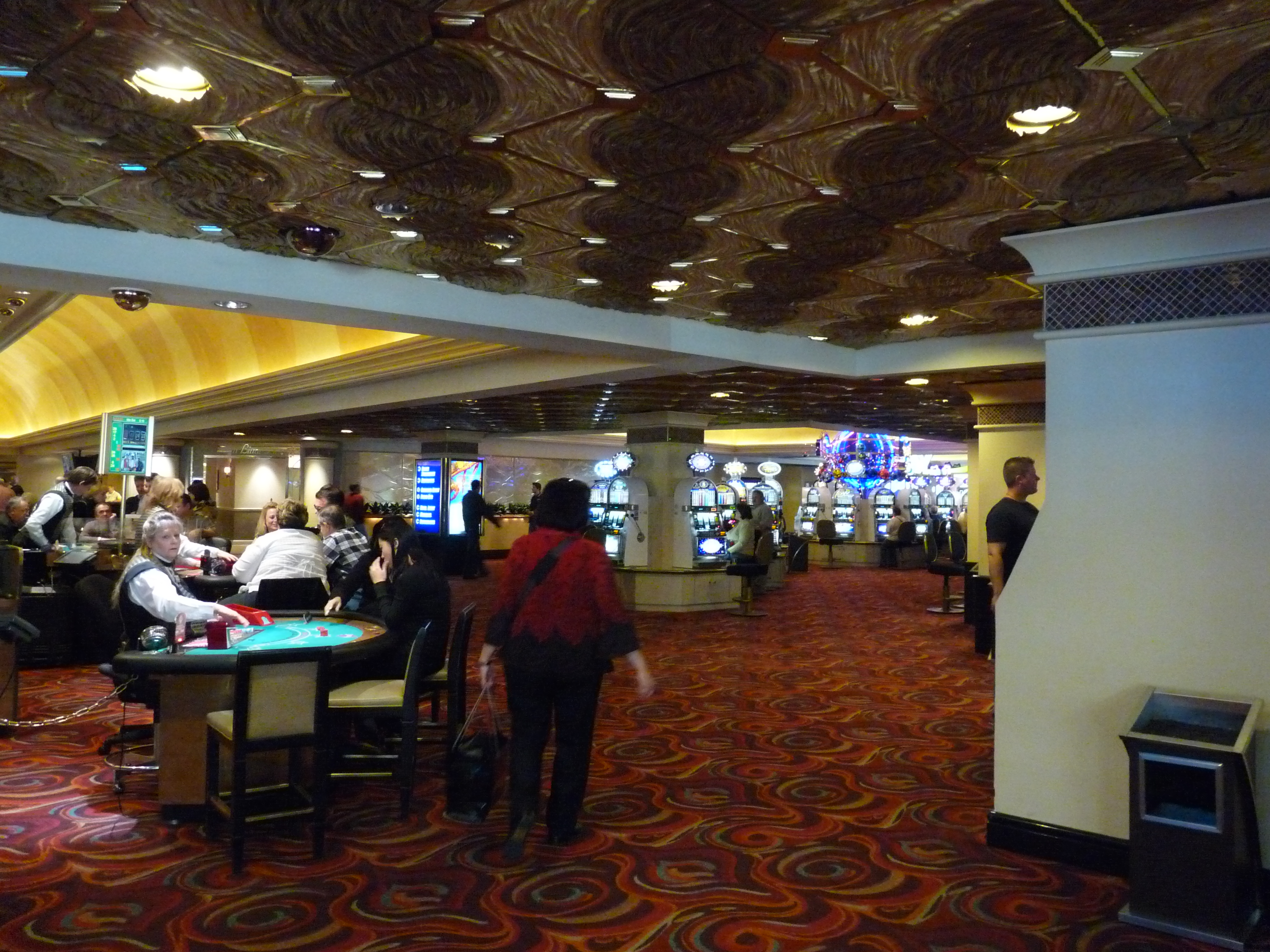
Casino floor in 2009

In June 2005, Harrah's Entertainment purchased Caesars Entertainment, Inc., which included the acquisition of the O'Sheas Casino and the Flamingo, both directly south of the Imperial Palace. Two months later, Harrah's announced plans to purchase the Imperial Palace for $370 million, giving the company a sizable and contiguous ownership of the center Strip. Harrah's had long wanted to acquire the Imperial Palace, and there was speculation that the company would demolish it for a new project. Harrah's chairman Gary Loveman said that plans were underway to develop the area for long-term success, stating that properties such as the Imperial Palace "are going to require very substantial modifications or complete tear-downs and rebuilds."

Harrah's completed its purchase in December 2005, and announced that the Imperial Palace would remain open into 2007, while redevelopment options were considered. The hotel had 2,640 rooms, and the casino included 1,600 slot machines and 56 table games. Harrah's leased the Imperial Palace name through a deal set to expire in 2012. Harrah's redevelopment plans were delayed in 2006, when two firms announced plans to purchase the company.

In 2007, Harrah's decided not to demolish the Imperial Palace or its neighbors. In 2009, the Imperial Palace added The King's Ransom, an exhibit of Elvis Presley memorabilia. A year later, Harrah's was renamed Caesars Entertainment Corporation.

In August 2011, Caesars announced that the Imperial Palace name would be replaced, with a new name to be chosen at a later date. The property would also be renovated. Later that year, Caesars began construction on Project Linq, an outdoor collection of restaurants, bars, and retailers. The project was built on land between the Imperial Palace and Flamingo. The Imperial Palace still had some rooms left from the earlier Flamingo Capri, which were among the oldest rooms at the resort; 90 of these rooms were demolished around late 2011, making room for the Linq project. The project was intended as an urban gathering place, targeting younger, budget-conscious visitors. The name "Linq" was meant as a reference to a sense of community that the project aimed to create. It also referred to the project's location, connected between the Imperial Palace and the Flamingo.

The Imperial Palace's wedding chapel was among the facilities to receive renovation work. The resort's main entrance on Las Vegas Boulevard was closed on May 1, 2012, as part of the ongoing construction for Project Linq. A new resort entrance was built at the property's north end. The Rockhouse bar and nightclub, which had operated at the original entrance for several years, was permanently closed.

=== The Quad (2012–2014) ===
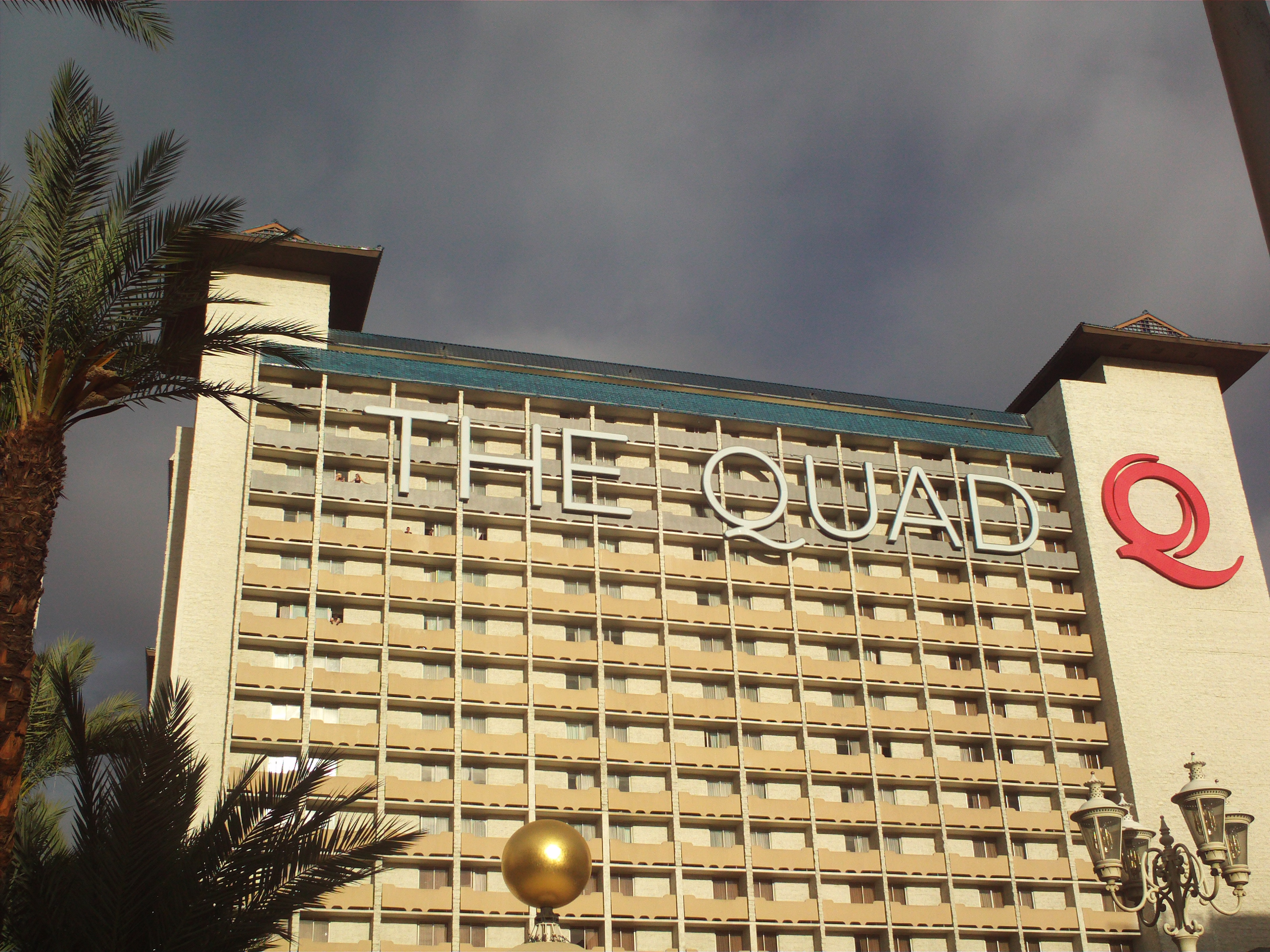
Front of the Quad hotel, 2013

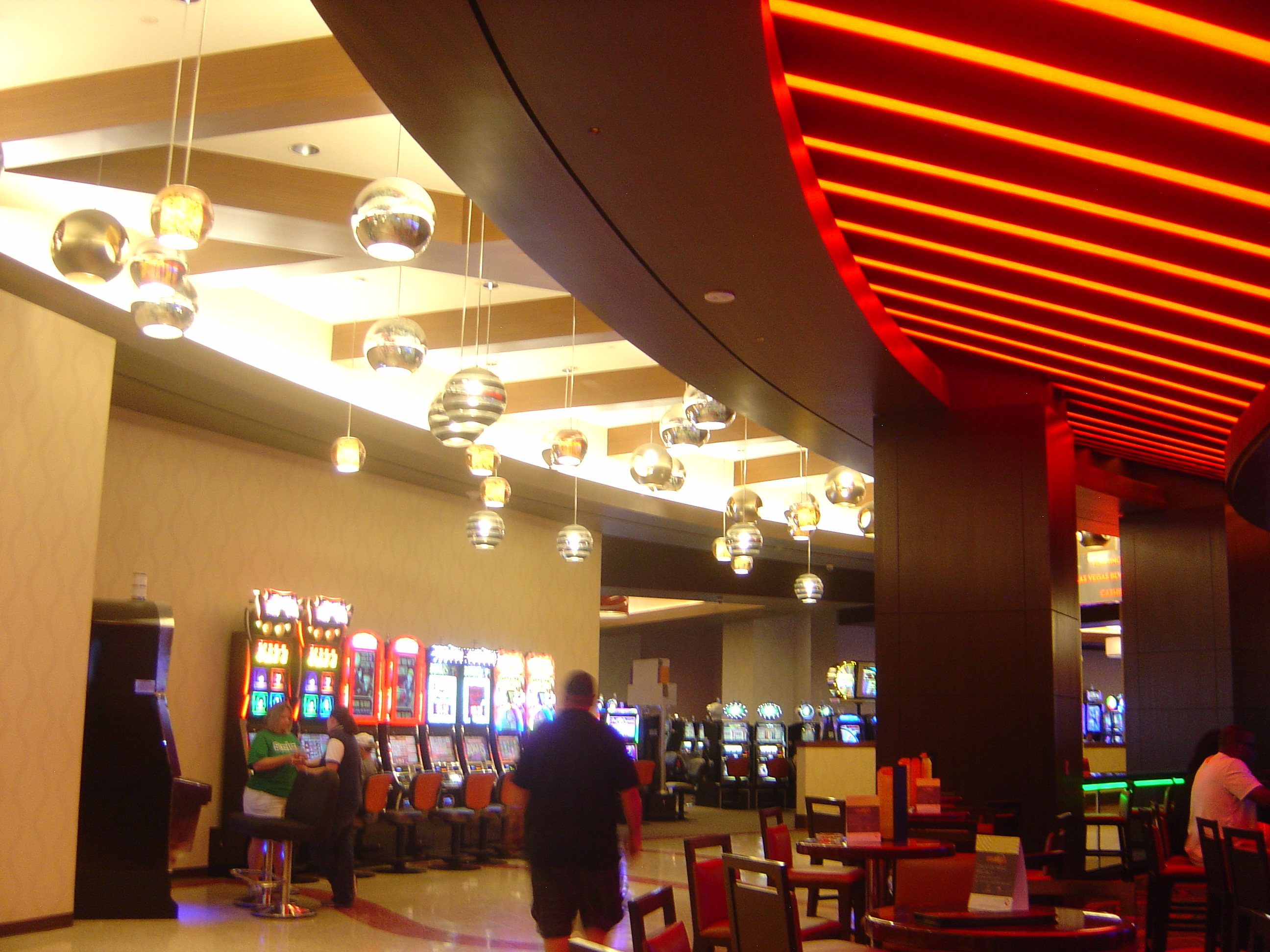
Casino floor

On September 17, 2012, Caesars announced that the Imperial Palace would be renamed The Quad. Caesars stated that the name was chosen to denote a center of activity, similar to a college quadrangle. The Quad would serve as the primary entrance for the Linq retail and entertainment complex. Further renovations would modernize the property and would take place in phases, lasting through 2013. The hotel would retain its 2,543 rooms and several restaurants.

The name change to Quad became official on December 21, 2012. The property's design was changed entirely. The Asian theme was removed, and a giant "Q" replaced the Imperial Palace exterior logo sign. A portion of the renovated casino was opened in March 2013, featuring red, silver, and gold colors. Friedmutter Group handled the interior designs. The casino floor received new slot machines and table games. The Quad also added several new restaurants, including one by Guy Fieri.

=== The Linq (2014–present) ===
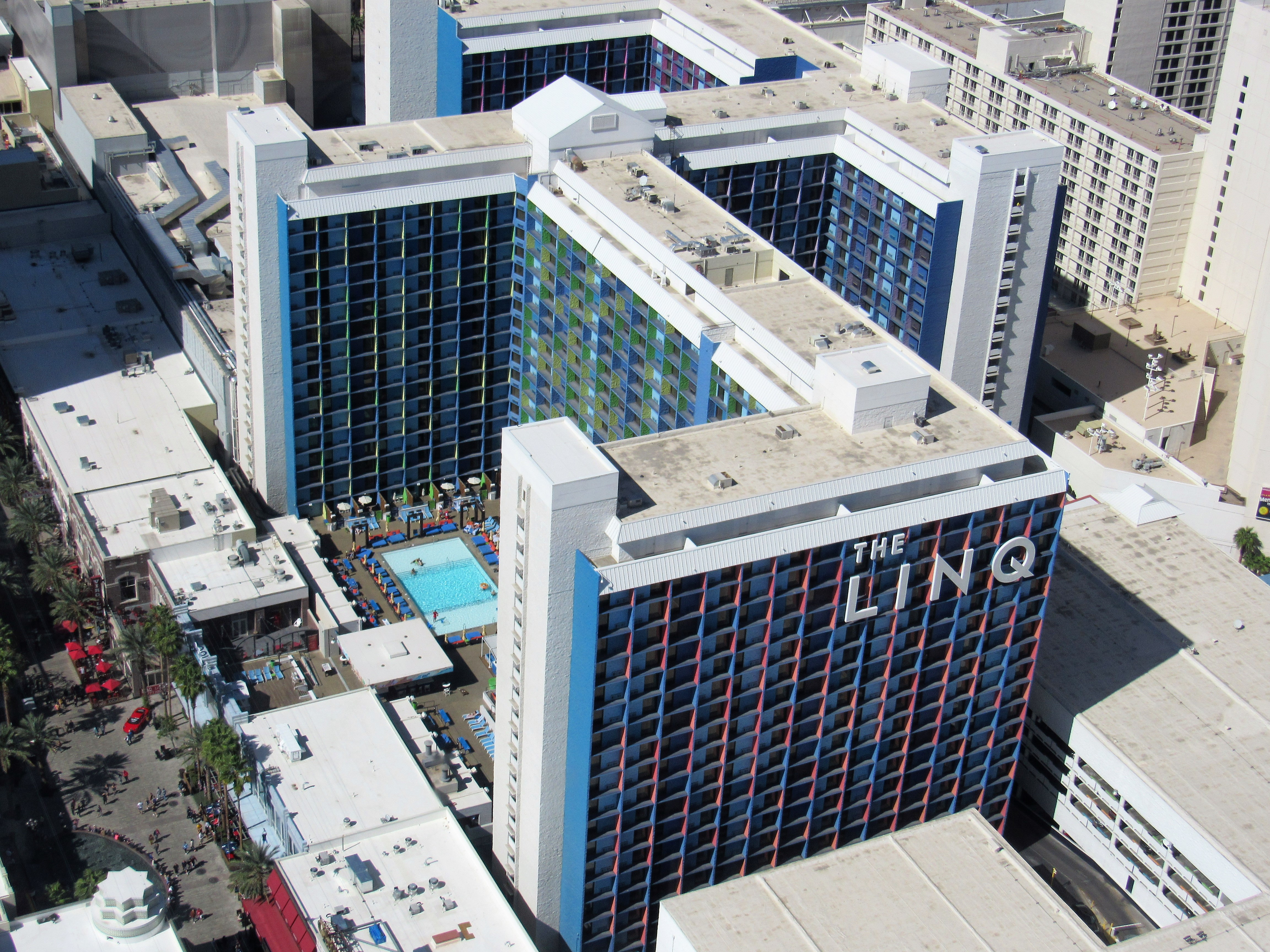
Rear view of the Linq resort, seen from the High Roller Ferris wheel

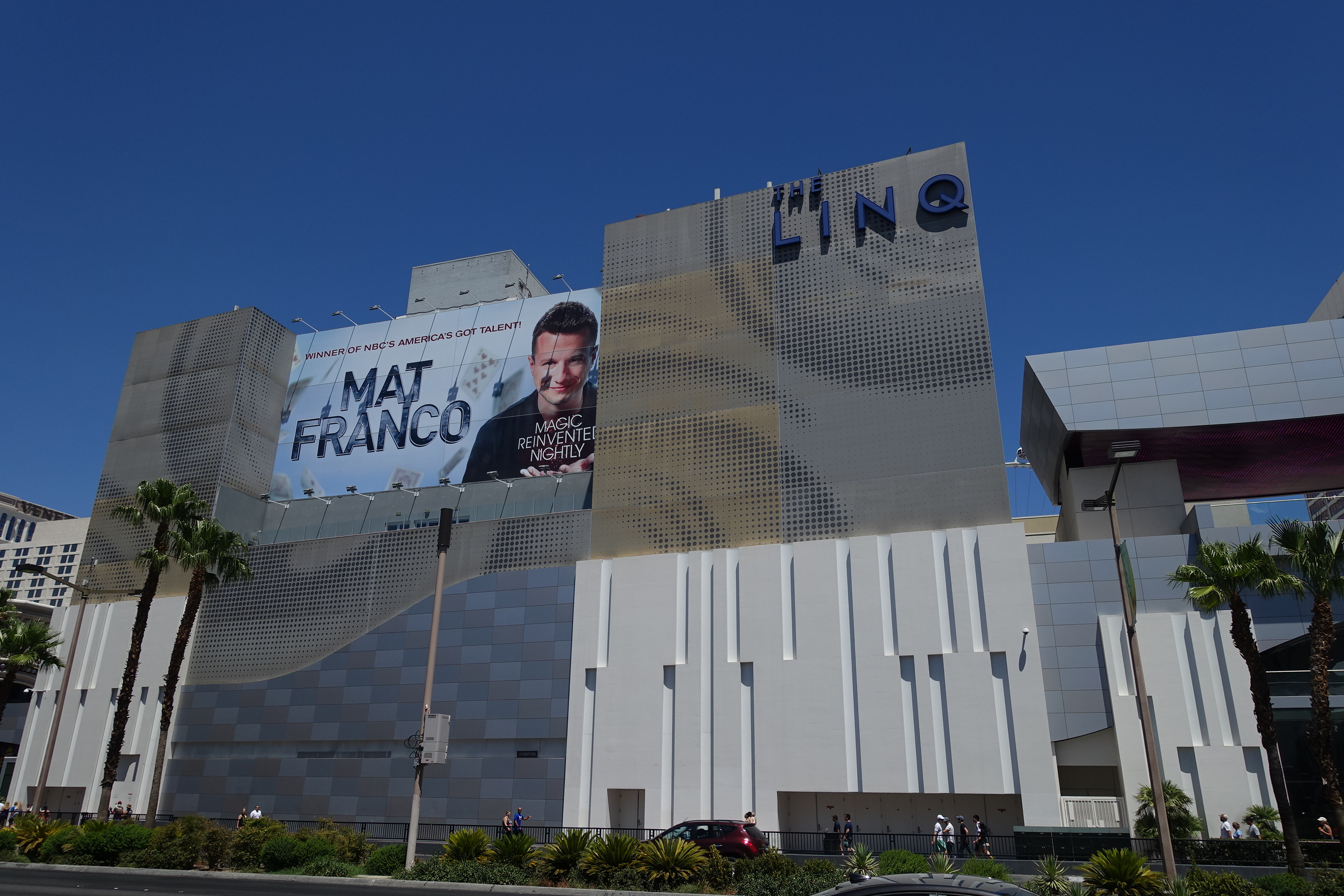
Linq façade along the Strip, 2017

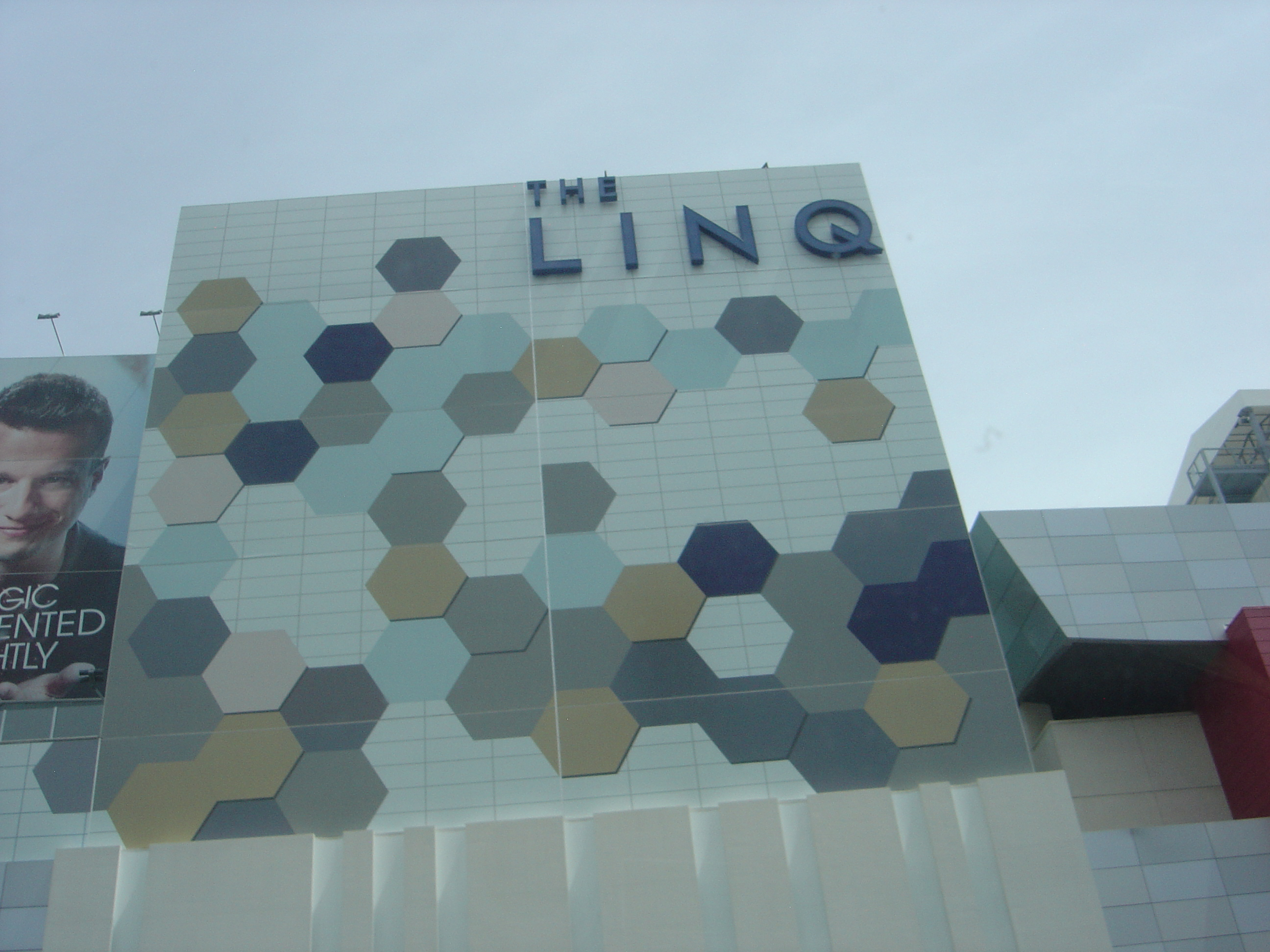
Revamped façade in 2020

Project Linq was eventually finished as The Linq Promenade, opening in December 2013. On July 1, 2014, Caesars announced that it would rename the Quad as The Linq Hotel & Casino, matching the new promenade. Jon Gray, the general manager for the promenade, said the change would provide a "complete, seamless experience. The new name clears up any confusion. It's all Linq."

The name change took place on October 30, 2014, and was accompanied by a $223 million renovation. The hotel rooms were remodeled, and the resort's interior was brightened and opened up more for a spacious appearance. The hotel-casino was modernized and designed to target a millennial demographic. The property featured self-check in, while touchscreens allowed guests to make reservations for restaurants and entertainment. Outlets for cellphones and laptops were added throughout the property, and digital televisions in the hotel rooms were used to order room service.

A bar and lounge area known as 3535 – referencing the resort's address – was added in the hotel lobby. It was among several other bars in the casino. Final renovations – including a new spa, fitness center, two new pools, and event space – were completed in July 2015. A year later, the Linq started offering 12 hotel rooms with bunk beds, being the only Strip property to offer such a feature. The hotel also rented board games to guests.

The Linq opened a technologically advanced, 11,000 sq ft (1,000 m^{2}) sportsbook, The Book, on September 6, 2018. It is a reimagined version of the traditional sportsbook concept. In addition to sports betting, patrons can also order food from the resort's restaurants and can play sports video games in The Book. It is divided into 12 rentable areas known as Fan Caves, each one including TVs, an Xbox One game console, and virtual reality headsets. The Book also features a self-serve beer wall and a food truck; the latter was added due to popular demand by millennials. The food menu and sports betting are accessed through tablet computers. Caesars intended for The Book to serve as a testing ground for new concepts, which could potentially be implemented at its other properties to attract millennials.

By 2019, the casino included a video game arcade, and three-dimensional LED sculptures that react as people walk by. In 2019, ESPN announced that it would construct a new Las Vegas studio at The Linq, as part of its partnership with Caesars Entertainment to provide sports betting information. The 6,000 sq ft (560 m^{2}) studio began operations in 2020, producing digital content related to sports betting, as well as its television program Daily Wager and segments for other programs. The studio closed in 2023 after ESPN signed with competitor Penn Entertainment on its ESPN Bet service, with Daily Wager (which was retitled ESPN Bet Live as part of the agreement) moving back to ESPN's main studio in Bristol, Connecticut.

The Linq includes a 33,890 sq ft (3,148 m^{2}) casino and 2,250 rooms.

=== Flood incidents ===
The Flamingo Capri was built over the Flamingo Wash, which the motel advertised as a "Venetian canal". The property was prone to flooding, including an incident in 1975 that left water damage in the casino and portions of the motel. The Imperial Palace's parking garage was also built over the wash, suffering the same consequences during storms. In 1983, the casino was briefly closed while eight feet of water rushed through the parking area and garage, leaving mud in the pool area and in more than 20 ground-floor rooms.

In 2004, two men had to be rescued by firefighters after their car stalled in flood water behind the garage. The Clark County Fire Department stated that such rescues had to be performed at the property on a regular basis. During floods, the garage is usually closed off, preventing guests from leaving. The resort had no plans for structural changes, stating that prior research had never turned up a viable solution. Efforts to prevent future flooding were hindered, as an underground drainage system could not be installed without possibly weakening the foundation. The parking garage was left unchanged during the transformation into the Linq, and the property continued to suffer from flooding. A 2017 storm left some cars in the garage partially underwater, and six people had to be rescued. Footage of the parking garage's flooding often goes viral.

== Attractions ==
=== The Linq Promenade ===
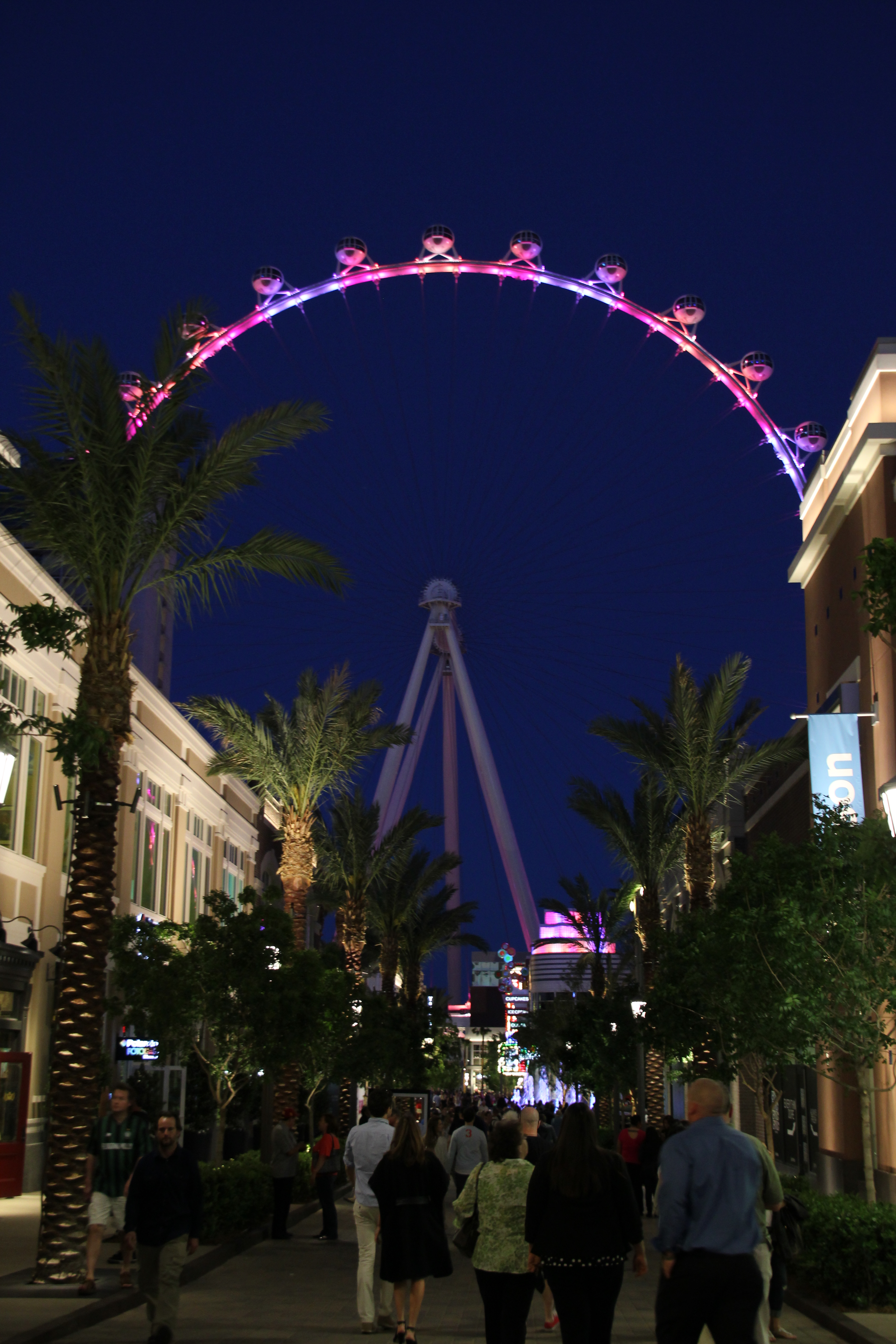
The Linq Promenade with the High Roller in the background in 2014

The Linq Promenade is an outdoor entertainment district, spread across a 1,200-foot-long pathway that runs along the resort's southern edge. Most of the tenants are restaurants or nightlife businesses. A new version of the O'Sheas Casino is among the tenants, and is attached to the Linq's casino floor. A primary attraction at the Linq Promenade is the 550-foot High Roller observation wheel, which was the tallest in the world upon opening in 2014. It is located at the east end of the promenade. The Linq also features the 78,000 sq ft (7,200 m^{2}) Brooklyn Bowl, which includes a restaurant, music club, and a two-floor bowling alley with 32 lanes.

Caesars decided to build the project in 2007, and eventually announced its plans in July 2009, under the name Project Link. It would contain an outdoor collection of restaurants and bars that would be built between the original O'Sheas and the Flamingo. These plans were considered again in 2010, with the proposal now known as Project Linq. By that time, a Ferris wheel and retail space had been added to the proposed plans. Project Linq received final county approval in August 2011. The original O'Sheas, located along the Strip, was demolished to make way for Project Linq. The project also replaced an old parking garage and an alleyway, in addition to the Flamingo Capri rooms and tennis courts for the main Flamingo resort.

Project Linq was inspired by The Grove and Third Street Promenade, both entertainment and retail complexes in Los Angeles. The Meatpacking District in Manhattan was another inspiration. The Linq project was developed by Caruso Affiliated, which previously created The Grove. Construction began in November 2011. Portions of it opened on December 27, 2013, and it celebrated its grand opening in February 2014. Additional tenants continued to open over the next several months. The promenade cost $550 million to construct.

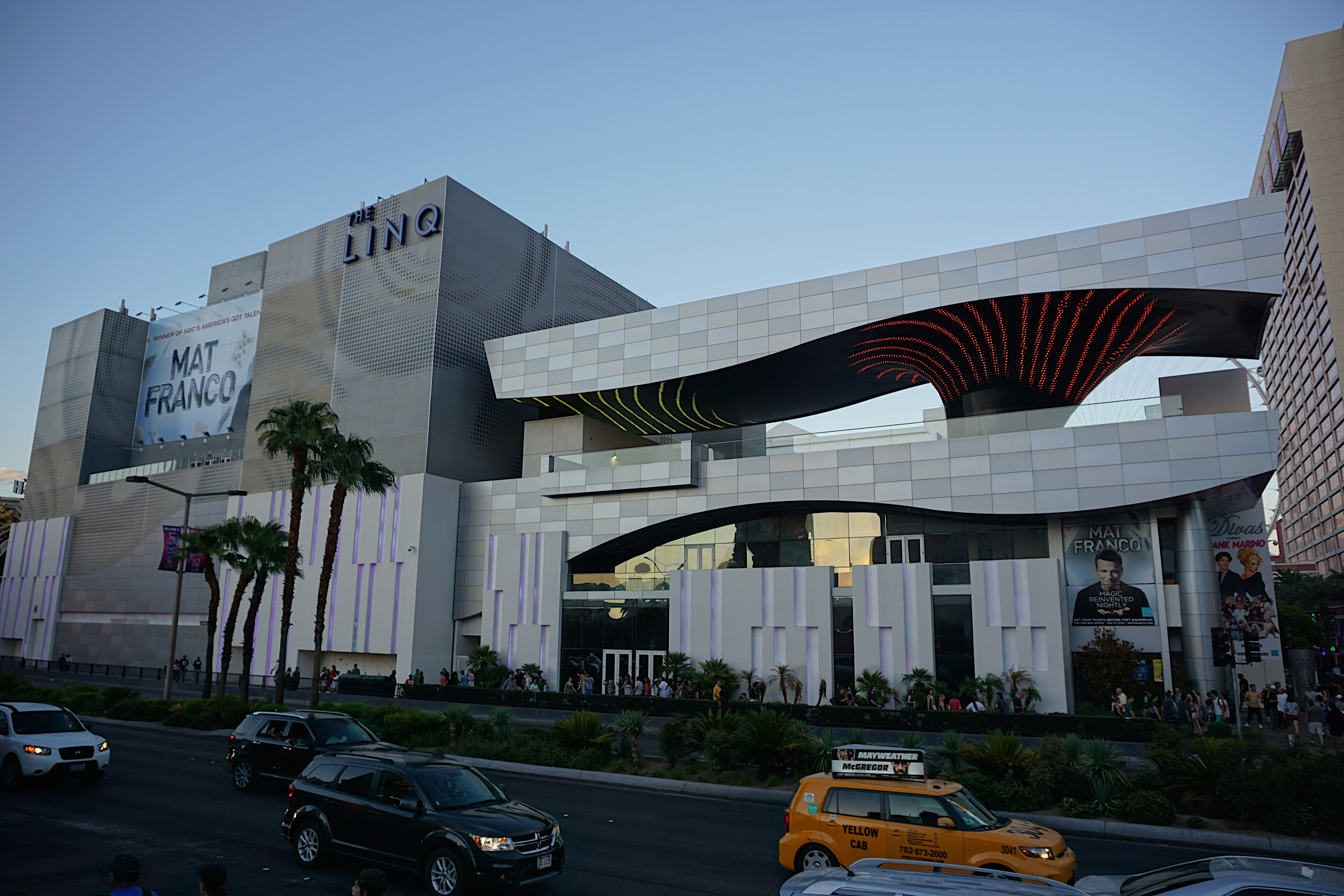
The Vortex (right) in 2017

A multi-story structure, known as the Vortex, was built on the former O'Sheas land, marking the entrance to the Linq Promenade. The structure includes a top-floor deck that is used for events, and a vortex-shaped LED canopy that displays advertisements to people below.

By 2017, the Linq Promenade had added the Strip's first In-N-Out Burger, and Caesars also announced plans to add Fly Linq, the first and only zipline on the Strip. Construction of the $20-million zipline was underway in April 2018. It opened on November 9, 2018, and features 10 side-by-side ziplines that travel over the promenade.

Comedian Jimmy Kimmel partnered with Caesars to create Jimmy Kimmel's Comedy Club, which opened at the promenade in 2019. Later that year, the promenade added the world's largest ice bar, measuring 1,200 sq ft (110 m^{2}).

In 2024, Caesars sold the promenade to TPG Real Estate and Acadia Realty Trust. The $275 million sale did not include the High Roller.

=== The Auto Collections ===
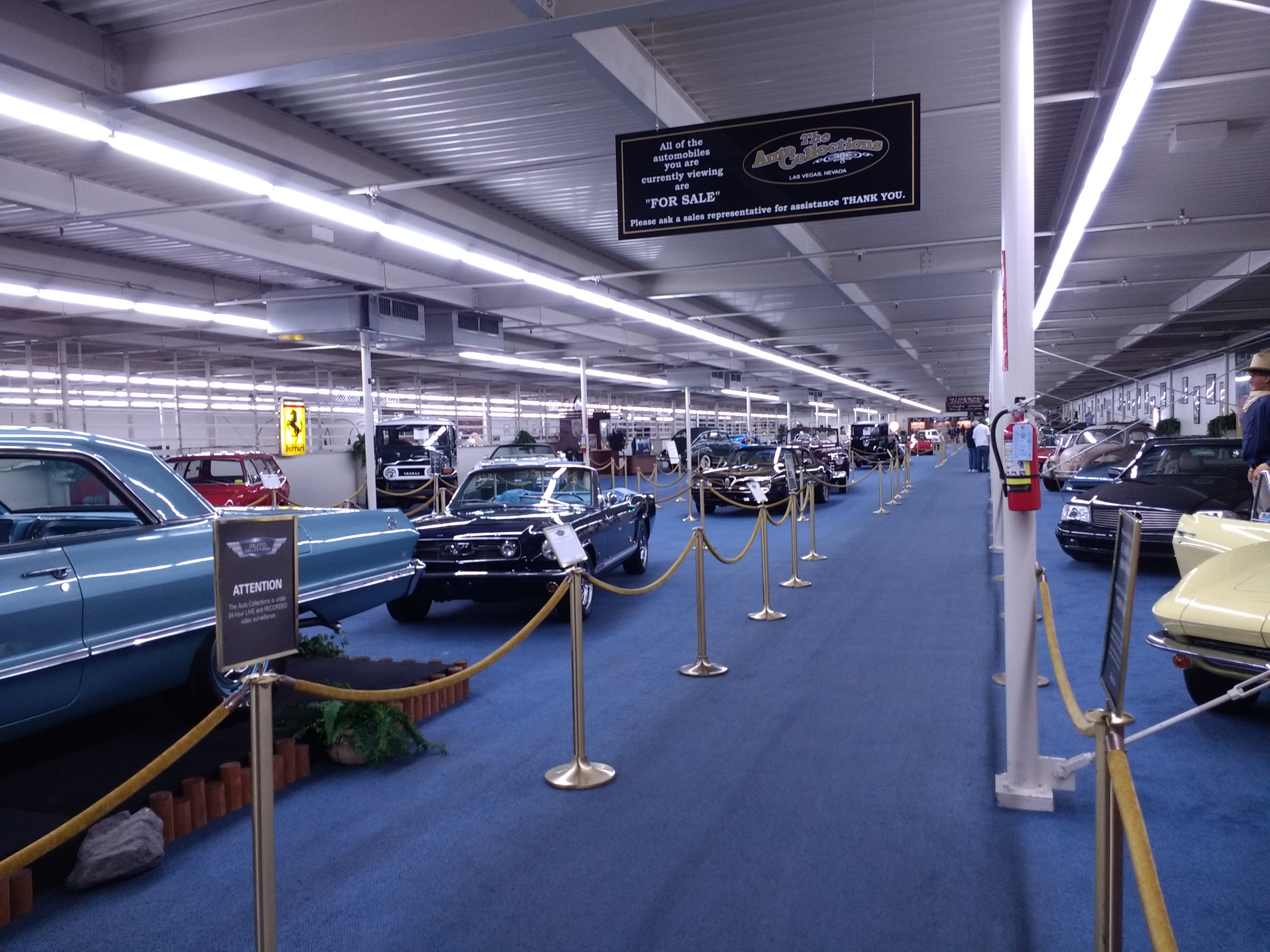
The Auto Collections in 2017

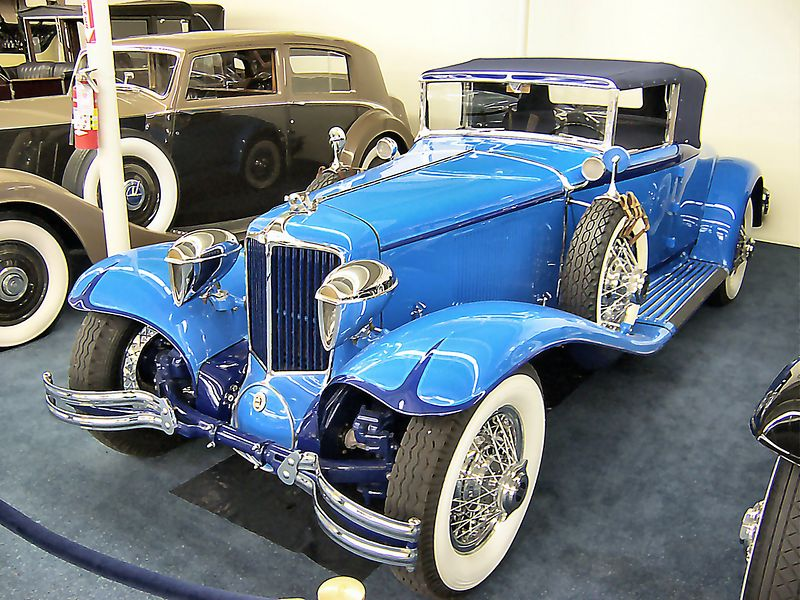
A 1930 Cord L-29

The Auto Collections was a collection of classic vehicles on display at the resort until 2017. The museum opened on December 1, 1981, known then as the Antique and Classic Auto Collections. The museum initially consisted of Engelstad's own private car collection, worth over $10 million at the time of the opening. The exhibition was located in an air-conditioned facility on the 5th floor of the resort's parking garage.

Don Williams and Richie Clyne took over operations of the museum in 1999. Because the museum was a significant attraction, the Imperial Palace leased the space to Williams and Clyne for only $1 a year. Under their management, the museum began offering its vehicles for sale and trade on February 1, 2000. Williams and Clyne sold off Engelstad's original collection of cars and gradually replaced it with new vehicles. Approximately 200 vehicles were kept in storage nearby; these would be put on display to take the place of those that had been sold in the exhibit. Approximately half of the vehicles in the collection were owned by Williams and Clyne. A single mechanic was responsible for maintaining the vehicles.

The collection occupied 125,000 sq ft (11,600 m^{2}) of space, and included vehicles once owned by celebrities or state officials. Among these was a 1939 Chrysler Royal sedan, which Engelstad purchased from Johnny Carson for $1 in 1994. This was the only vehicle from Engelstad's personal collection to remain part of the museum, having never been put up for sale. Other vehicles throughout its history included a 1955 Lincoln Capri convertible owned by Marilyn Monroe, and a 1976 Cadillac Eldorado Biarritz owned by Elvis Presley. The museum sometimes displayed vehicles from films, including "Eleanor" from Gone in 60 Seconds, and a Ford Torino from Starsky & Hutch.

The Auto Collections closed on December 30, 2017. Rob Williams, the general manager and a part-owner, said about the closure, "It's time; it's basically that simple. We've had a great run here … It's just time to close it down and move on to our next endeavors." Although visitor attendance had slightly declined, it was not a reason for the closure.

== Shows and entertainers ==
The Imperial Theatre showroom, with 850 seats, was opened in June 1980. It featured the dance show Bravo Vegas, with Engelstad as executive producer. Legends in Concert opened at the Imperial Palace in May 1983. The show featured musical performances by celebrity impersonators, and would continue running at the Imperial Palace for nearly 26 years. As of 2007, Legends in Concert was the third longest-running show on the Las Vegas Strip. In 2009, the show moved to an updated venue at Harrah's.

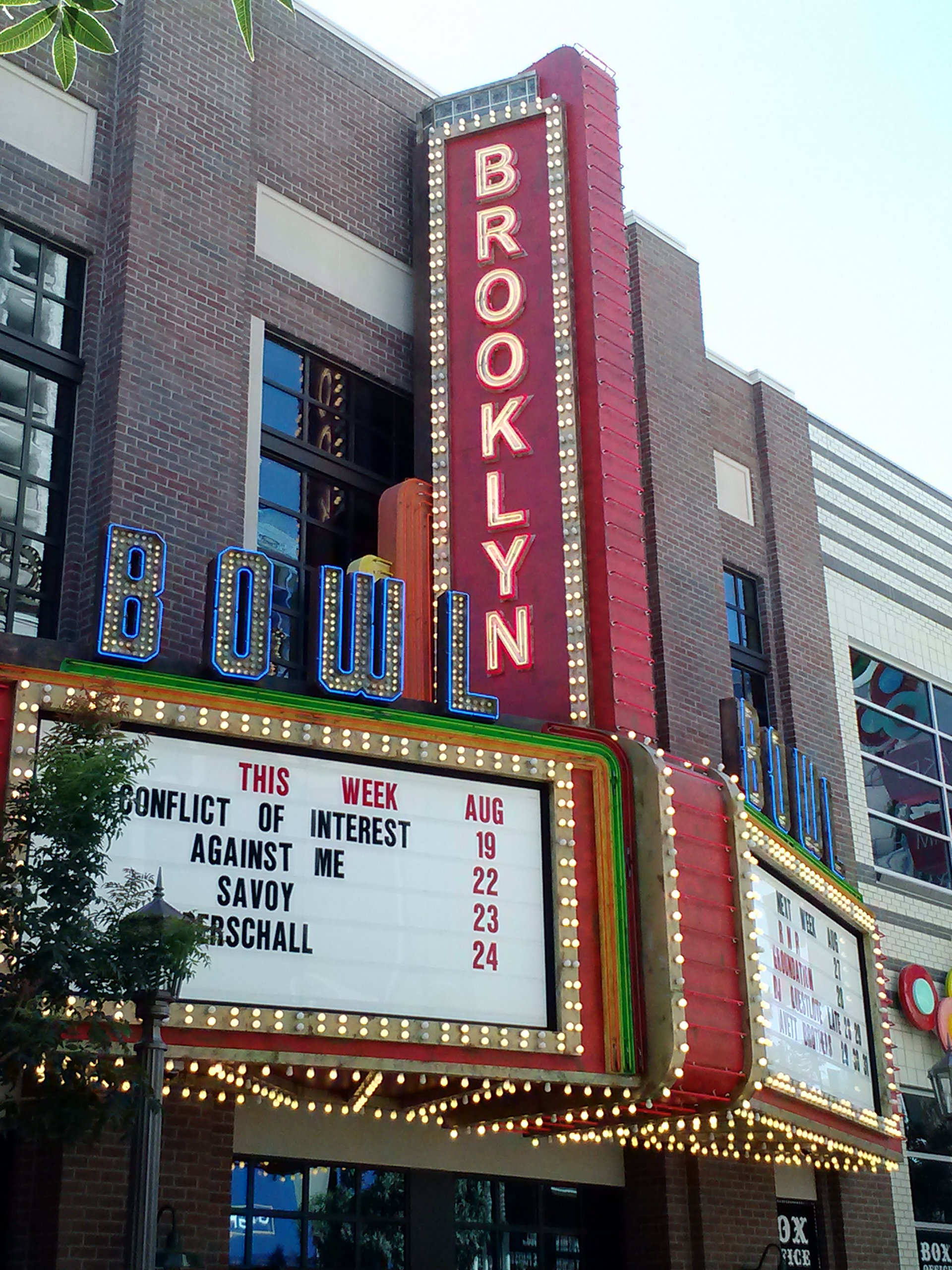
Brooklyn Bowl in 2014

In July 2003, the Imperial Palace casino opened its Legends Pit, named after Legends in Concert. It featured celebrity impersonators as blackjack dealers, known as Dealertainers. The resort's managers devised the concept after spotting an Elvis impersonator on the Las Vegas Strip. Dealertainers impersonated celebrities such as Michael Jackson, Cher, Britney Spears, and Buddy Holly. In addition to dealing, they would also provide musical performances on a central stage. Caesars announced the sudden discontinuation of the Dealertainer Pit on September 8, 2014, without explanation.

The musical group Human Nature performed at the Imperial Palace from 2009 to 2012. During that time, the 653-seat showroom was renamed the Human Nature Theater.

In February 2010, Frank Marino began a show titled Divas Las Vegas, in which he impersonated a number of female singers such as Beyoncé and Cher. Marino and Caesars mutually agreed to end the show in 2018, after he accidentally failed to make a regular donation to the Make-A-Wish Foundation.

Juggler and comedian Jeff Civillico began a show at the Quad in 2012. The 2,000-seat Brooklyn Bowl venue opened at the Linq Promenade in March 2014, with Elvis Costello and The Roots as the first entertainers to perform there. Magician Mat Franco began a show at the Linq resort in 2015, titled Mat Franco: Magic Reinvented Nightly. The resort's showroom was named after him in 2017.

In 2024, the Linq resort debuted DiscoShow, a show by Spiegelworld that is dedicated to the disco era of 1970s New York City. It is a 70-minute standing-only show, written by Michael Wynne and directed by Steven Hoggett. Seven years were spent developing DiscoShow, which cost $40 million to produce. It features a cast of dancers and also allows the audience to participate on the dance floor. The show venue is located in the former Imperial Palace sportsbook, which sat vacant for years. DiscoShow ended its run on January 3, 2026 due to slow ticket sales, and the space will remain vacant in the interim. Diner Ross, a restaurant serving American cuisine, was also built by Spiegelworld to accompany the show, along with two bars, all adjacent to the venue. The restaurant and bars will remain open despite the show closure.

== Popular culture ==
The Imperial Palace appears in the 1984 film Love Streams, and the 1986 film Stripper.

The establishment can be seen in the background of an episode of the TV series "Matlock", entitled "The Gambler" in 1987 (SS2E12). For the 1988 film Midnight Run, the exterior was used as the unnamed casino for character Jimmy Serrano's base of operations. In the 1997 film Austin Powers: International Man of Mystery, the character Alotta Fagina stays at the Imperial Palace. It also appears in the 2004 video game Grand Theft Auto: San Andreas, under the name "Four Dragons" (based on the Asian-inspired Imperial Palace theme used at the time).

The Linq resort hosted the film premiere of Sharknado 5: Global Swarming on August 6, 2017. The second season of Double Shot at Love was partially filmed at the resort.

== See also ==
- List of casinos in Nevada
- List of integrated resorts
