= Vinnie Favorito =

American stand-up comedian

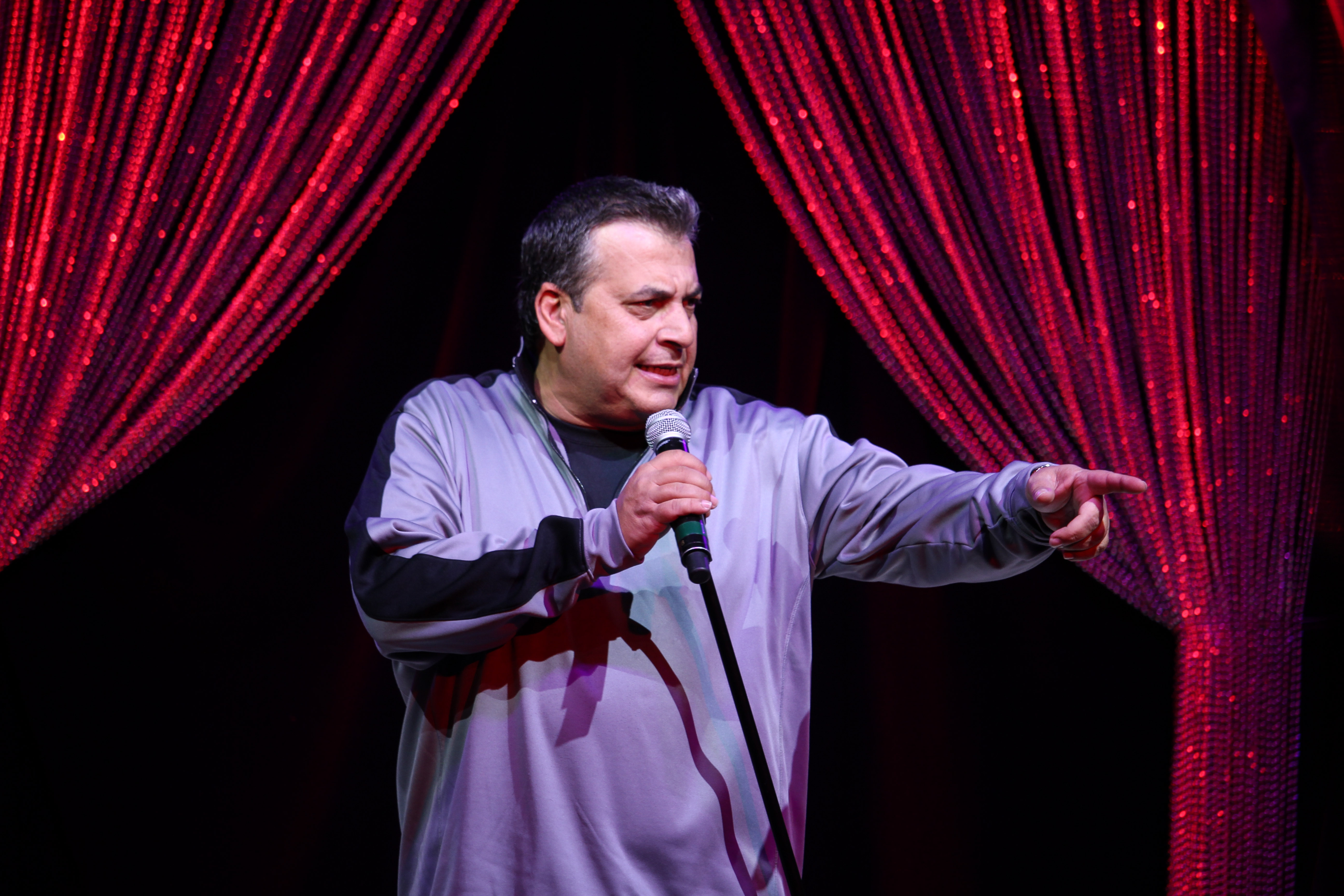
- Vinnie Favorito performing at the Westgate Las Vegas Resort & Casino in 2016.
- Born: August 23, 1960 (age 66)

Comedy career
- Years active: 1986–present
- Medium: Stand-up
- Genres: Observational comedy, black comedy, insult comedy, satire

Vinnie Favorito (born August 23, 1960) is an American stand-up comedian. He is known for high-profile celebrity roasts of notable figures in American culture and sports, as well as his 20-year history as a headlining comedian in Las Vegas. He currently performs five nights a week in the show "Vinnie Favorito Unfiltered" at the Westgate Las Vegas Resort & Casino.

== Career ==
Favorito started his comedy career in Boston, Massachusetts in 1986 alongside comedians Joe Rogan, Nick Di Paolo, Jackie Flynn, Louis C.K., and David Cross. Favorito stayed in Boston for ten years, playing shows at every major comedy club in the city such as Nick's Comedy Stop, Comedy Connection, Stitches, and Play it Again Sam's, frequently with touring comics such as Drew Carey and Ray Romano. By 1990, Favorito was voted one of the Top Ten comics in Boston by the Boston Herald.

"The best comics came out of Boston. Most of us have gone through shit but we are survivors and our talent keeps us going. We truly did have great times. Pranks, long fun drives going from gig to gig. So much fun." -Vinnie Favorito on the Boston comedy scene, 2016.

After a decade in Boston, Favorito moved to Los Angeles, California for five years where he was a frequent performer at clubs like The Comedy Store and The Improv. In 1998, he won the San Francisco International Comedy Competition and performed at the Montreal Comedy Festival which earned Favorito notoriety in the industry. Afterward, Favorito went on tour, performing in major comedy clubs all over the country. He was soon offered two television deals by CBS which he turned down. He subsequently shot a pilot for Fox Family called "Favor and Family." When the pilot was not picked up, he was offered his own show in Las Vegas.

As a comedian, Favorito has specialized in celebrity roasts, drawing comparisons to the great roastmasters of The Dean Martin Celebrity Roasts. Favorito has roasted celebrities such as Tom Arnold, Magic Johnson, Pat O'Brien, Stan Winston, Jerry Springer, Larry Flynt, and Larry King. Favorito brings the comedy atmosphere of a celebrity roast to his stage shows where each member of the audience becomes the subject of their own celebrity roast.

From 2003 to 2004, Favorito headlined at Binion's Gambling Hall and Hotel, becoming their first-ever headliner. From 2004 to 2008, Favorito performed at O'Shea's Casino. From there, Favorito began his long run at the Flamingo Las Vegas, where he performed multiple times a week from 2008 to 2014. He currently performs in his new show, Vinnie Favorito Unfiltered, five nights a week at the Westgate Las Vegas Resort & Casino.

In addition to stage performances, Favorito is also known for his work in radio and television. He regularly appears on The Best Damn Sports Show Period and hosted his own show on Fox Sports Radio called The Wise Guys. Additional television and film appearances include Clueless, One World, The Late Late Show with Craig Kilborn, among others.

== Controversy ==
Vinnie Favorito has been profiled in the Las Vegas Review Journal as someone who borrowed money from venue staff where he performed, and from unsuspecting fans, partners, etc., and then not repaying the debt/loan. This behavior continues to this day as he continues to borrow from friends and acquaintances in the Boston area.

That behavior led Caesars Entertainment to end its involvement with Favorito by revoking the agreement for the performance space Favorito leased, forcing the closure of his show; Favorito's show rented space from the Flamingo Casino in Las Vegas; the show was not a contracted/hired show. Vinnie Favorito's abuse of debt led to a bankruptcy filing on September 7, 2016, wherein "claiming he has less than $50,000 in assets and owes $1 million to $10 million (a wide range indeed, but it's one of the brackets to check on the U.S. Bankruptcy Court's filing form)."
