= Frank Marino (female impersonator) =

American female impersonator

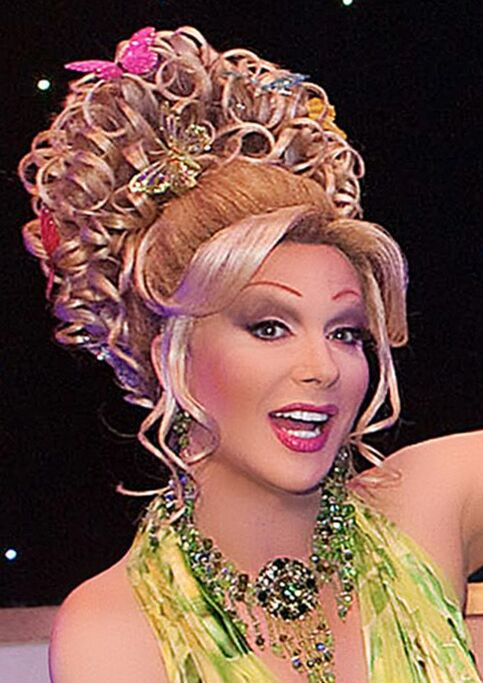
- Frank Marino (2015)
- Born: November 20, 1963 (age 62); Brooklyn, New York, U.S.
- Other name: Ms. Las Vegas
- Occupation: Female impersonator
- Years active: 1985–Current

Frank Marino (born November 20, 1963) is an American female impersonator dubbed "Ms. Las Vegas" for his longtime starring role as Joan Rivers in the Las Vegas drag revue Frank Marino's Divas Las Vegas, which played at The Linq (formerly known as Imperial Palace and The Quad) on the Las Vegas Strip until June 2018. In July 2021 Marino was called "the undisputed Queen of Las Vegas and the world's most successful tribute artist" by Las Vegas Today Magazine.

== Career ==
Famous for his lavish on-stage wardrobe (much of which was designed by Bob Mackie, who has also done fashions for Rivers), Marino has received two Las Vegas Walk of Fame stars and received another star when Las Vegas Mayor Oscar Goodman honored his hard work and commitment to the Las Vegas performance world with "Frank Marino Day" on February 1, 2005.

Marino has been playing Joan Rivers in Las Vegas drag shows since 1985 and, according to his 2005 appearance on the Discovery Health Channel series Plastic Surgery: Before and After, once held the unofficial record for the longest continuous performance run at a single casino in Las Vegas when he played Rivers for more than 20 years at the Riviera Hotel and Casino in the long-running drag show An Evening at La Cage; according to his website, he now holds the record as the longest-active and longest-running headliner on the Strip.

In 2010, Marino moved his show to the Imperial Palace Hotel and Casino, and renamed it "Frank Marino's Divas Las Vegas". He has appeared both as his Joan Rivers persona and as himself in several movies and TV shows. Once sued by Rivers for $5,000,000 (US) in the 1980s, the pair later reconciled and appeared on TV shows together. Marino is the highest-paid female impersonator in the world bringing in over $2.5 million a year for his show Divas Las Vegas and is worth over $20 million. He was called the "Entertainer of the Century" by Las Vegas Today Magazine.

In 2018 he appeared in ITV's Last Laugh in Vegas.

== Personal life ==
Marino currently resides in Las Vegas. In late 2004, Marino, his birth mother Mary Mastrangelo, and his then-longtime partner's mother Malka Schechter were filmed for a feature for Plastic Surgery: Before and After, having a family outing at Dr. Goesel Anson's plastic surgery practice; the trio's plastic surgery results were shown for the first time on national TV in May 2005.
