= Great Guinness Toast =

The Great Guinness Toast is an annual event that takes place across the world on, according to Guinness, on 13 February but evolved to be the 3rd Friday of February each year. The event is considered to have repeatedly broken the world record for largest toast.

There is much confusion concerning the actual date of the toast mainly due to a lack of information on the web. Many sites are non-Guinness affiliated and have the date listed as the "3rd Friday in February" which has been the US schedule since the mid-1990s. However, Mullaney's Harp & Fiddle Pub in Pittsburgh, PA, the pub claiming to have started the toast, had celebrated it on 19 February 2010 (the third Friday of the month).

== History ==
In 1993, Guinness, authors of the book of world records and purveyors of stouts, ales and lagers, decided to establish a new world record, the world's largest toast.

In 2001 and as captured in the Guinness Book of Records, over 300,000 adults, age 21 and older, raised their pint glasses of Guinness. The Great Guinness Toast will be held in more than 60 cities across the United States.

The Great Guinness Toast was started at Mullaney's Harp & Fiddle Pub in Pittsburgh in 1993.

The toast in 2007 was on February 13, 2007. The toast in 2008 (15th Anniversary of the Toast) was on February 13, 2008. The toast in 2011 was held on February 18, 2011
