= Horseshoe Casino (disambiguation) =

Horseshoe Casino, currently known as Binion's Gambling Hall and Hotel, is a casino in downtown Las Vegas.

Horseshoe Casino may also refer to:

- Horseshoe Casino Baltimore, the second biggest casino in Maryland
- Horseshoe Casino Cincinnati, now Hard Rock Casino Cincinnati, in Cincinnati, Ohio
- Jack Cleveland Casino, formerly Horseshoe Casino Cleveland, in the downtown core of Cleveland, Ohio
- Horseshoe Casino Tunica, a casino resort located in Tunica Resorts, Mississippi
- Horseshoe Bossier City, a riverboat casino in Bossier City, Louisiana
- Horseshoe Council Bluffs, in Council Bluffs, Iowa
- Horseshoe Hammond in Hammond, Indiana
- Horseshoe Las Vegas, formerly Bally's Las Vegas, on the Las Vegas Strip in Paradise, Nevada
- Horseshoe Southern Indiana, now Caesars Southern Indiana, in Elizabeth, Indiana
- Horseshoe St. Louis, a casino hotel in St. Louis, Missouri

== See also ==
- Horseshoe Gaming Holding Corporation, a company that developed casinos under the Horseshoe brand
