= Harrah's Entertainment =

American gaming corporation

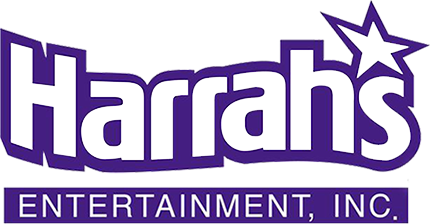
- Type: Public
- Traded as: Nasdaq: CZR
- Founded: 1990; 36 years ago Reno, Nevada, U.S.
- Defunct: July 20, 2020; 6 years ago
- Fate: Acquired by Eldorado Resorts
- Headquarters: Paradise, Nevada, U.S.

Harrah's Entertainment (later named Caesars Entertainment Corporation, previously The Promus Companies) was an American casino and hotel company founded in Reno, Nevada, and based in Paradise, Nevada, that operated over 50 properties and seven golf courses under several brands. In 2013, it was the fourth-largest gambling company in the world, with annual revenues of $8.6 billion. It was acquired in 2020 by Eldorado Resorts, which then changed its own name to Caesars Entertainment.

At the end of its existence, Caesars was a public company, majority owned by a group of private equity firms led by Apollo Global Management, TPG Capital, and Paulson & Co. and Carl Icahn. Caesars' largest operating unit filed for Chapter 11 bankruptcy protection in 2015, which led to the foundation of Vici Properties as a result.

== History ==
=== William F. Harrah era (1937–1978) ===
The company's background can be traced to October 29, 1937, when Bill Harrah opened a small bingo parlor in Reno, Nevada, a predecessor to Harrah's Reno. In 1955, he expanded to Stateline, Nevada, on the south shore of Lake Tahoe, where he would eventually open Harrah's Lake Tahoe.

Harrah's Inc. made its initial public offering in 1971. In 1972, it was listed on the American Stock Exchange and in 1973, Harrah's became the first casino company listed on the New York Stock Exchange.

In 1978, Bill Harrah died at the Mayo Clinic Hospital in Rochester, Minnesota, at the age of 66, during a cardiac surgery operation to repair an aortic aneurysm.

=== Under Holiday Inn ===
In February 1980, Holiday Inn acquired Harrah's, Inc. for $300 million. Liquidation of Harrah's collection of almost 7,000 antique automobiles reportedly returned the full purchase price of the company to Holiday Inn. Holiday Inn at the time had interests in two casinos: the under-construction Holiday Inn Marina Casino in Atlantic City, and a 40 percent stake in the Holiday Casino, adjacent to the Holiday Inn hotel on the Las Vegas Strip.

In July 1987, Bill's Casino Lake Tahoe opened. Harrah's Laughlin opened in August 1988.

=== The Promus Companies ===
The company that would become Harrah's Entertainment was formed in 1990 as The Promus Companies. To effect the sale of the Holiday Inn hotel business to Bass PLC, Promus was created as a corporate spin-off, holding Harrah's, Embassy Suites, Homewood Suites, and Hampton Inn; Bass then acquired Holiday Corp., which retained only the Holiday Inn assets. The next year, the company's headquarters moved from Reno to Memphis, Tennessee.

In April 1992, the Holiday Casino was rebranded as Harrah's Las Vegas.

The late 1980s and early 1990s saw a rapid increase in gambling markets with the growth of Indian gaming and legalization of riverboat casinos. In 1993 and 1994, the company opened Harrah's Joliet, Harrah's Vicksburg, Harrah's Tunica, Harrah's Black Hawk, Harrah's Central City, Harrah's Shreveport, Harrah's North Kansas City, and Harrah's Ak-Chin.

=== Renamed as Harrah's Entertainment ===
In 1995, Promus decided to spin off its non-gaming hotel businesses, in part because they had been undervalued by investors due to perception of the company as a risky gaming stock. Promus Hotel Corp. was established, holding Embassy Suites, Hampton Inn, and Homewood Suites, while the parent company, holding 16 casinos, was renamed as Harrah's Entertainment.

Harrah's continued its expansion over the next ten years, opening Harrah's Skagit Valley, SkyCity Auckland, Harrah's St. Louis-Riverport, Harrah's Cherokee, Harrah's Prairie Band, Harrah's New Orleans, and Harrah's Rincon, and acquiring the Southern Belle Casino, Showboat, Inc., the Rio All Suite Hotel and Casino, Players International, Harveys Casino Resorts, Louisiana Downs, Horseshoe Gaming, and the World Series of Poker.

On September 4, 1997, Harrah's Entertainment launched its Total Gold loyalty program (renamed as Total Rewards on April 4, 2000 and again as Caesars Rewards on February 1, 2019), developed at a cost of $20 million. It was the first gaming company to offer a systemwide comps program, allowing points earned at one casino to be redeemed for goods and services at any of the company's other casinos. The system would be credited as a major driver of Harrah's growth over the coming years.

Harvard Business School professor Gary Loveman joined Harrah's as chief operating officer in 1998, and would go on to serve as chief executive officer from 2003 to 2015.

In 1999, the company moved its headquarters from Memphis to Las Vegas.

=== Purchase of Caesars Entertainment, Inc. ===
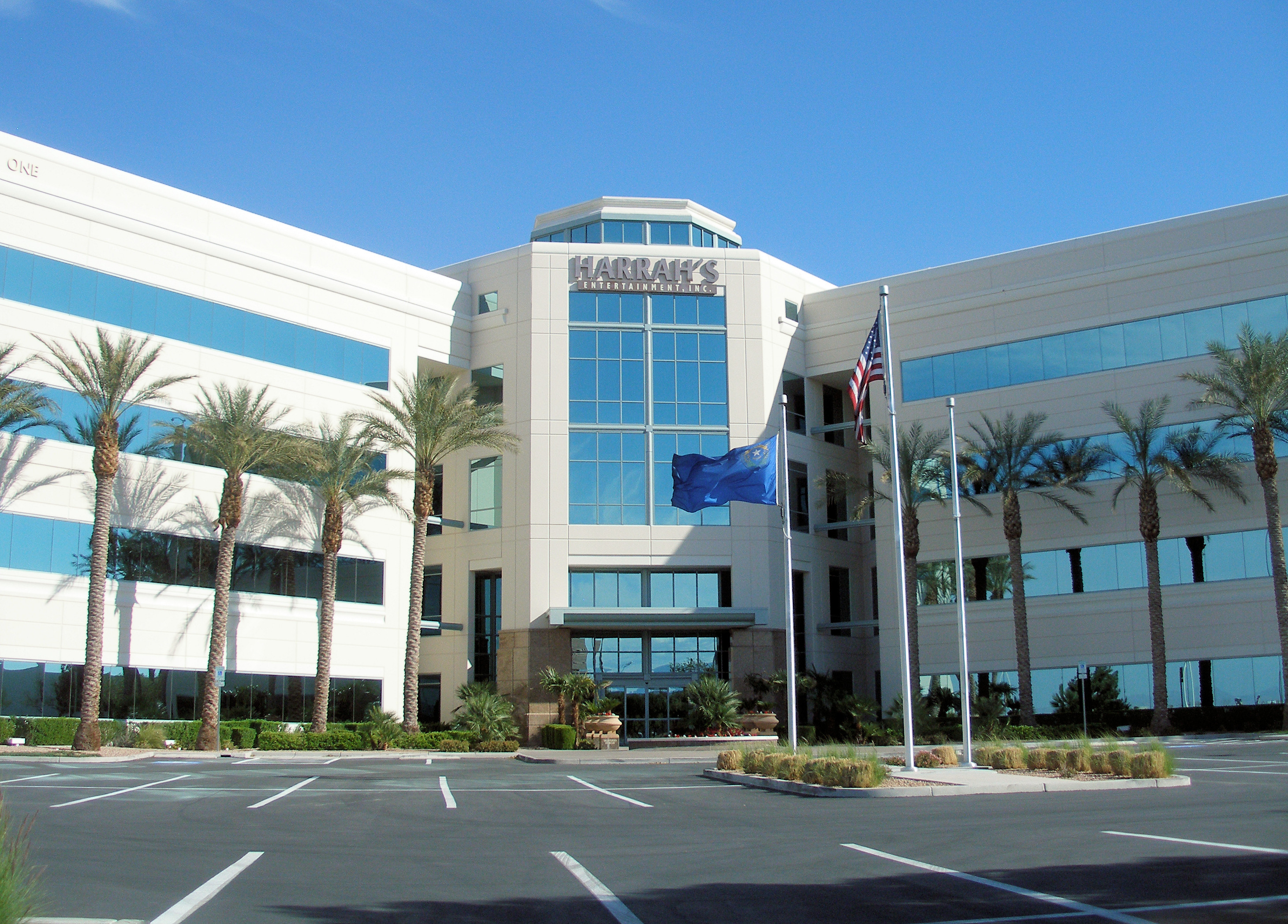
Former headquarters and corporate offices

Harrah's made its largest single expansion in 2005, when it acquired Caesars Entertainment, Inc. for $10.4 billion. Negotiations were spurred on by news of a merger agreement between MGM Mirage and Mandalay Resort Group. The two companies sold several properties ahead of the merger to assuage antitrust concerns, including Harrah's East Chicago and Harrah's Mardi Gras. The acquisition increased Harrah's portfolio to 40 casinos, plus four cruise ship casinos. The deal furthered Harrah's goal of gaining a larger presence on the Las Vegas Strip, where Caesars owned four casinos, and improved its ability to market to high rollers.

Harrah's began to push for a larger international presence in 2005, announcing joint venture agreements to build casinos in Spain, Slovenia, and the Bahamas, and applying for a license to build a major resort in Singapore, though none of these projects would come to fruition. Harrah's also acquired London Clubs International in 2006, and the Macau Orient Golf club in 2007.

From 2005 to 2010, the company consolidated control of a long stretch of the east side of the Las Vegas Strip, acquiring the Bourbon Street, Imperial Palace, Barbary Coast, and Planet Hollywood casinos, along with large tracts of land behind the Strip properties.

In 2005 and 2006, Harrah's Entertainment closed its Lake Charles casino due to damage from Hurricane Rita, sold the Flamingo Laughlin and sold Grand Casino Gulfport.

=== Company goes private ===
Loveman at some point sought advice from private equity tycoon David Bonderman about the possibility of spinning off ownership of Harrah's Entertainment real estate as a separate real estate investment trust (REIT), hoping to attain the higher price-to-earnings ratios at which hotel companies traded, compared to gaming companies. In 2006, the discussions evolved toward the idea of a leveraged buyout of Harrah's by Bonderman's company, TPG Capital. Another private equity firm, Apollo Global Management, approached Loveman about a buyout and he encouraged them to collaborate with TPG. By the end of the year, an agreement was announced for the two companies to buy Harrah's Entertainment for $17.1 billion in cash plus $10.7 billion in assumed debt. The transaction closed in January 2008, leaving Harrah's with $25.1 billion in debt.

=== The Linq ===
It was widely announced in previous years that the company planned to implode properties and build new ones from scratch, but after the market downturn the company conceded that it had little experience in building major resorts. Instead it developed Project LINQ in 2009, which would add 20 restaurants and bars between the company's Imperial Palace, O'Sheas and Flamingo casinos, on the east side of the Las Vegas Strip. The goal was to create an entertainment district similar to what had developed organically in Los Angeles, Memphis and New Orleans but did not yet exist on the Strip, with its enclosed and casino-centric zones. It provided competition for the Fremont Street Experience.

=== Las Vegas Arena ===
The Anschutz Entertainment Group first tried to build an arena in Las Vegas in association with Harrah's Entertainment. In 2007, the joint venture announced they would build a 20,000-seat stadium behind the Bally's and Paris casino-hotels. Caesars Entertainment, Inc. had previously envisioned using the location to build a baseball park, but the company's buyout by Harrah's cancelled the plans. Through the following year, Harrah's got uncertain on continuing with the project, not knowing if AEG would split the costs and whether building a major league-ready stadium without a guaranteed franchise to play on it would be feasible during the 2008 financial crisis. The original plans were to break ground in June 2008 and finish the arena in 2010, but by 2009, it was revealed the stalled project had not even done a traffic study despite being located near a busy intersection. In 2010, the plans were changed to use an area behind the Imperial Palace. However, given the financing would require a special taxation district, opposition from the Clark County Commission regarding using public money in the project stalled it even further. AEG eventually backed out completely by 2012, once MGM Resorts International came up with their own project using a terrain behind the New York-New York and Monte Carlo resorts. This attracted AEG primarily for not relying on public funding.

The acquisition of Planet Hollywood provided Harrah's Entertainment with a contiguous 126-acre (51 ha) property bordering the strip. The vacant lots behind the casinos had been slated for a sports arena large enough to hold a professional basketball or hockey team. The three casinos will have over 8,000 rooms which can be directly connected to the arena.

It was announced in August 2010 that Harrah's Entertainment would run casinos in Cincinnati and Cleveland in Ohio when they opened in 2012.

=== Renamed as Caesars Entertainment Corporation ===
Harrah's Entertainment logo (2005–2010)

Caesars Entertainment logo (2010–2020)

On November 23, 2010, plans for an IPO were canceled, but a planned name change from Harrah's Entertainment to Caesars Entertainment Corporation did go forward and was made official on the same day. This change was intended to capitalize on the international name recognition of the Caesars brand. The Harrah's brand would remain one of the company's three primary casino brands.

On February 8, 2012, an initial public offering took place, with the common stock trading on the NASDAQ under the symbol "CZR."

=== Caesars Acquisition Company merger ===
On December 22, 2014, Caesars announced its intention to acquire Caesars Acquisition Company. Under the terms of the transaction, shareholders of Caesars Acquisition Company would receive 0.664 share of Caesars Entertainment common stock for each share of Caesars Acquisition Company held.

=== Casino unit files for Chapter 11 bankruptcy ===
The casino operating unit, Caesars Entertainment Operating Company, Inc. and approximately 170 of its subsidiaries filed for Chapter 11 bankruptcy on January 15, 2015. The casino unit's parent company, Caesars Entertainment Corporation, did not file for bankruptcy protection. The casino operating group's investors initiated litigation against the parent company, Caesars Entertainment Corporation's over the parent company's debt guarantees. Vici Properties was founded as a result.

On November 2, 2015, Rock Gaming announced it would begin assuming management of Horseshoe Casino Cleveland, Horseshoe Casino Cincinnati and ThistleDown Racino from Caesars Entertainment and complete the transition by June 2016.

=== Playtika Company acquisition and sale ===
Caesars acquired Playtika in May 2011 for an amount between $80 and $90 million. Playtika, a social game developer company, was founded in 2010 by Robert Antokol and Uri Shahak and produced Facebook social gaming platforms (slotomania.com & caesarsgames.com). In June 2016, a Chinese consortium, which included Alibaba chief Jack Ma's Yunfeng Capital, agreed to purchase it in a buyout for $4.4 billion.

On November 29, 2017, Caesars announced it was selling Harrah's Las Vegas to Vici Properties while Caesars continued to operate it. The same day, they announced that they were buying Centaur Gaming. In addition, they were building a new convention center in Las Vegas named Caesars Forum.

=== Caesars and Eldorado merger ===
In February 2019, Turner Sports announced an agreement with Caesars to provide sports betting content for its sports news website Bleacher Report, including a dedicated studio at Caesars Palace in Las Vegas.

On March 17, 2019, it was announced that Caesars Entertainment Corporation and Eldorado Resorts were exploring a merger of the two companies. On June 23, 2019, Caesars officially accepted Eldorado's offer, reported to be worth almost $8.6 billion. Caesars controlled 53 assets compared to Eldorado's 26. After completion of the merger, 5 board members would come from Caesars and 6 would come from Eldorado.

In May 2019, ESPN announced a partnership with Caesars Entertainment, in which it would be the exclusive provider of sports odds across its programming, and ESPN would construct a Las Vegas studio at The Linq devoted to sports betting-oriented programming.

On April 16, 2019, Caesars announced that Affinity Gaming CEO Anthony Rodio would become the CEO of Caesars within 30 days, replacing Mark Frissora, who announced his intention to step down in November 2018. Rodio came recommended by investor Carl Icahn, who owned almost 100 million shares (a 28.5% stake in Caesars as of June 17, 2019) and had reportedly been pushing Caesars to sell the company.

Shareholders of Caesars and Eldorado approved the merger on November 15, 2019, and it was completed in July 2020.

=== Fines and settlements ===
In 2015 the US Treasury's Financial Crimes Enforcement Network (FinCEN) fined Caesars Entertainment's Las Vegas casino $8 million for failing to properly police transactions for illicit activity. A 2012 IRS examination found Caesars had failed to report to the authorities over 100 incidents involving potential criminal activity. The Nevada Gaming Control Board announced a related $1.5 million penalty.

Caesars Entertainment was censured by the UK's Gambling Commission in 2015 for lax money-laundering controls in at two of its London casinos. Caesars entered into a voluntary settlement, agreeing to improve its anti-money laundering processes and making a payment of £875,000 to be used for "socially responsible purposes".

In 2020 the UK Gambling Commission fined Caesars Entertainment EMEA a record £13m for failures relating to VIP schemes. The failures included allowing a customer to lose £323,000 in 12 months, despite showing signs of gambling addiction. Caesars was also found guilty of failing to prevent money laundering, and failing to check the source of funds of someone who bet £3.5m in three months, and a politically exposed person (PEP) who lost £795,000 in just over a year. Three senior managers lost their licence to run a gambling business.

=== Sale ===
In April 2020, Twin River Worldwide Holdings announced a deal with Caesars Entertainment and Vici Properties to purchase Bally's Atlantic City in Atlantic City, New Jersey.

== Properties ==
At the time of its acquisition in 2020, Caesars operated the following properties:

- Bally's
  - Bally's Atlantic City
  - Bally's Las Vegas
- Caesars
  - Caesars Atlantic City
  - Caesars Palace
  - Caesars Southern Indiana
- Harrah's
  - Harrah's Ak-Chin Casino
  - Harrah's Atlantic City
  - Harrah's Cherokee
  - Harrah's Cherokee Valley River
  - Harrah's Council Bluffs
  - Harrah's Gulf Coast
  - Harrah's Hoosier Park Racing & Casino
  - Harrah's Joliet
  - Harrah's Lake Tahoe
  - Harrah's Las Vegas
  - Harrah's Laughlin
  - Harrah's Louisiana Downs
  - Harrah's Metropolis
  - Harrah's New Orleans
  - Harrah's North Kansas City
  - Harrah's Northern California
  - Harrah's Philadelphia
  - Harrah's Resort Southern California
- Horseshoe
  - Horseshoe Casino Baltimore (50% ownership with Jack Entertainment)
  - Horseshoe Bossier City
  - Horseshoe Council Bluffs
  - Horseshoe Hammond
  - Horseshoe Casino Tunica
- Other Las Vegas Strip
  - The Cromwell Las Vegas
  - Flamingo Las Vegas
  - The Linq
  - Paris Las Vegas
  - Planet Hollywood Las Vegas
- Other US casinos
  - Harveys Lake Tahoe
  - Indiana Grand Racing & Casino
  - Rio All Suite Hotel and Casino
- International casinos
  - Caesars Windsor, Canada
  - London Clubs International (12 locations)

Properties previously operated by the company included:

- Atlantic City Country Club
- Atlantic Club Casino Hotel
- Bill's Casino Lake Tahoe
- Binion's Horseshoe
- Bourbon Street Hotel and Casino
- Caesars Golf Macau
- Caesars Palace at Sea
- Flamingo Laughlin
- Grand Casino Gulfport
- Harrah's East Chicago
- Harrah's Prairie Band
- Harrah's Reno
- Harrah's Shreveport
- Harrah's Sky City
- Harrah's St. Louis
- Harrah's Casino Tunica
- Harrah's Tunica Mardi Gras Casino
- Horseshoe Casino Cincinnati
- Horseshoe Casino Cleveland
- IP Casino Resort Spa
- Rio Secco Golf Club
- Showboat Atlantic City
- Showboat Hotel and Casino
- ThistleDown Racino
- Tunica Roadhouse
- Turfway Park (50% stake)
