= Jack Entertainment =

Gaming, hospitality, and entertainment company

Jack Entertainment LLC
- Formerly: Rock Gaming LLC (2009–2016)
- Type: Private
- Industry: Gaming, Hospitality, Tourism
- Founded: 2009 as Rock Gaming LLC
- Headquarters: Cleveland, Ohio, United States
- Key people: Matthew Cullen (chairman); Mark Dunkeson (CEO)
- Products: Casinos, Hotels, Entertainment, Thoroughbred horse racing
- Revenue: US$500 million as of January 2021
- Number of employees: 1,400 as of January 2021
- Website: jackentertainment.com

Jack Entertainment (formerly known as Rock Gaming LLC from 2009 to 2016) is a gaming, hospitality, and entertainment company based in Cleveland, Ohio. The company operates two gaming facilities in Ohio, Jack Cleveland Casino and Jack Thistledown Racino.

== History ==
=== Rock Gaming (2009–2016) ===
Jack Entertainment was founded as Rock Gaming in 2009 by seven businessmen led by Dan Gilbert, as chairman of its board and Matt Cullen as chief executive officer. The company was formed as the seven men backed the Ohio Casino Approval and Tax Distribution Amendment, which was ultimately approved by voters in November 2009.

In May 2012, Rock Gaming, in a joint venture with Caesars Entertainment, opened Horseshoe Casino Cleveland as well as gained a stake in a Kentucky racetrack, Turfway Park. The company quickly expanded in 2013, opening ThistleDown Racino in the nearby Cleveland suburb of North Randall and Horseshoe Casino Cincinnati. In that same year, the company acquired the Greektown Casino-Hotel in Detroit.

In April 2015, the company took on an operational focus and was approved by Ohio Casino Control Commission to be licensed as a management company. That same year, Rock Gaming bought out Caesars's minority equity interests and management contract, and assumed full operational control and full ownership of its Ohio gaming properties.

=== Jack Entertainment (2016–present) ===
On February 23, 2016, the company announced it was changing its name from Rock Gaming to Jack Entertainment. Throughout 2016, the company would also rebrand its casinos under the Jack name. The company stated it planned to spend $40 million on the rebranding. It also introduced a new customer loyalty program, ClubJack.

In September 2018, it was reported that Gilbert was looking to sell Jack Entertainment and exit the casino business. Two months later, Jack entered into an agreement to sell the Greektown casino to Vici Properties and Penn National Gaming for a total of $1 billion.

In September 2019, Jack Entertainment sold its Cincinnati casino for $745 million to Vici and Hard Rock International. The next month, Jack sold Turfway Park to Churchill Downs, Inc. for $36 million. In January 2020, the company also sold the real estate assets associated with its Cleveland casino and the Thistledown racino to Vici in a sale leaseback transaction.

Later in 2020, Gilbert sold his controlling stake in Jack Entertainment to a group of the company's managers, led by chairman Matthew Cullen and CEO Mark Dunkeson.

In June 2021, Jack moved its headquarters to Terminal Tower in Cleveland.

== Properties ==
Name	Location	Notes	Picture
Jack Cleveland Casino	Cleveland, Ohio	In November 2015, Rock Gaming acquired Caesars's stake in Horseshoe Casino Cleveland resulting in the company's complete ownership of the property, with the transfer completed June 2016.	
Jack Thistledown Racino	North Randall, Ohio	In November 2015, Rock Gaming acquired Caesars's stake in ThistleDown Racino, resulting in the company's complete ownership of the property, with the transfer completed in June 2016.	

=== Former properties ===
Name	Location	Notes	Picture
Caesars Interactive Entertainment	N/A	Partnership with Caesars Entertainment Corporation.	
Greektown Casino Hotel	Detroit, Michigan	Originally to be renamed Jack Detroit Casino-Hotel Greektown by the end of 2016 The name change never happened and the hotel/casino was sold to Penn National Gaming and Vici Properties on May 23, 2019.	
Horseshoe Casino Baltimore	Baltimore, Maryland	Partnership with Caesars Entertainment Corporation.	
Jack Cincinnati Casino	Cincinnati, Ohio	In November 2015, Caesars announced that it would cede management of its Horseshoe Casino Cincinnati resort to Rock Gaming, with the transfer completed June 2016. The property was sold to Vici Properties and Hard Rock International for $780 million in 2019, and is planned to be re-branded as a Hard Rock casino.	
Turfway Park	Boone County, Kentucky	Sold to Churchill Downs, Inc. in 2019.	

== See also ==
- List of casinos in Ohio
