= Bourbon Street Hotel and Casino =

Historic hotel and casino in Nevada, United States

Coordinates: 36.114869°N 115.167253°W

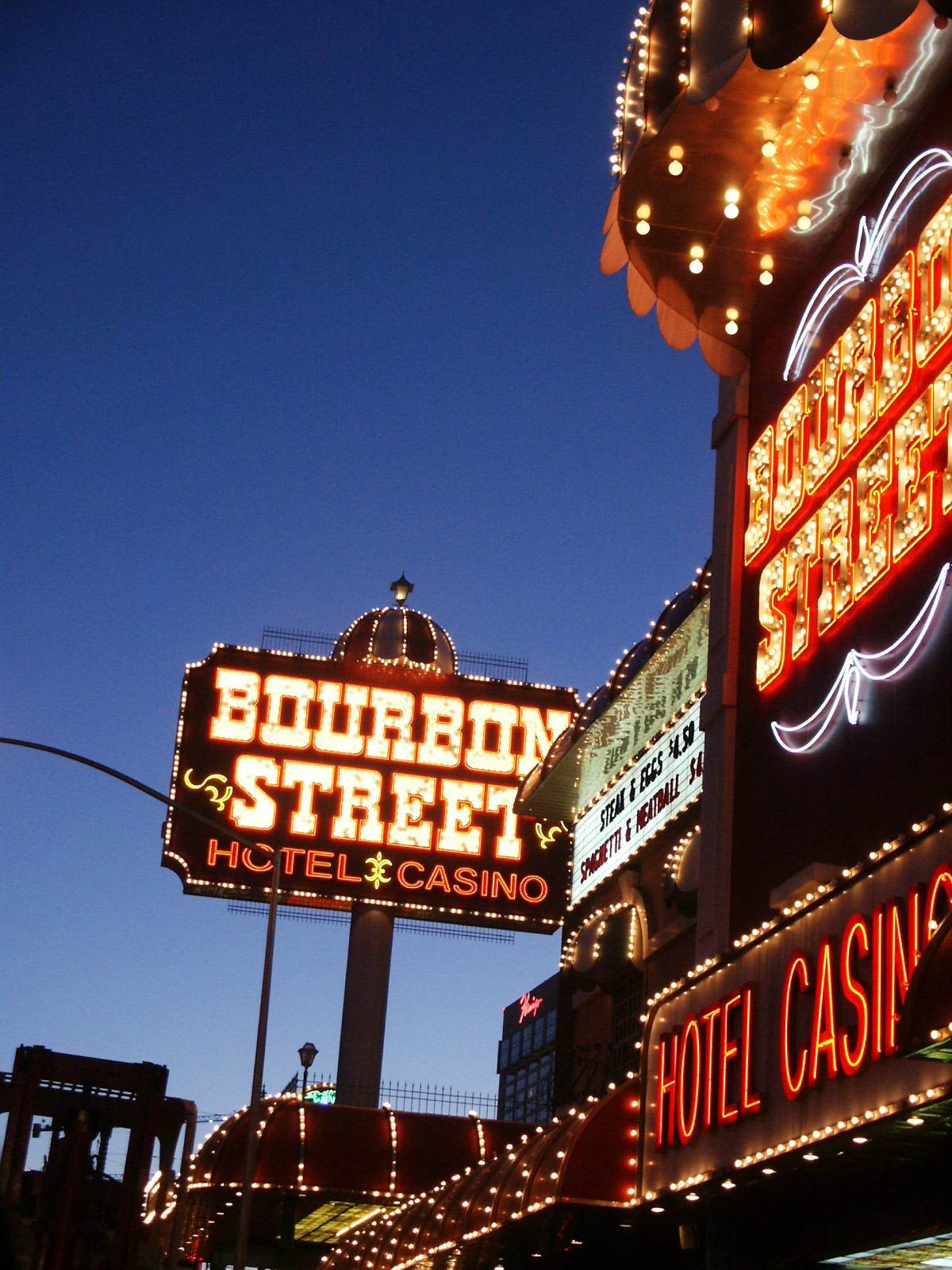

- Location within Las Vegas Strip Location within Nevada
- Interactive map of Bourbon Street Hotel and Casino
- Location: Paradise, Nevada 89109; 120 E Flamingo Road
- Opened: February 1980
- Closed: 18 October 2005; 20 years ago
- Theme: New Orleans
- No. of rooms: 166
- Gaming space: 15,000 sq ft (1,400 m^{2})
- Casino type: Land-Based
- Owner: Harrah's Entertainment
- Previous names: Shenandoah Hotel

Bourbon Street Hotel and Casino (named after New Orleans' Bourbon Street) was a small hotel and casino near the Las Vegas Strip in Paradise, Nevada. Opening in 1980 as the Shenandoah Hotel, the property was plagued with licensing and financial difficulties from the start. Ownership changed hands several times, with new proprietors often envisioning major renovations or redevelopment, but none of the plans came to fruition. Finally, in 2005, it was bought by Harrah's Entertainment (later Caesars Entertainment), who closed and demolished it.

== History ==
=== Shenandoah Hotel (1980-1985) ===
The Shenandoah Hotel began as a $29-million project, named after the Las Vegas estate of singer Wayne Newton, who was a minority investor in the property. The hotel opened in February 1980. The opening of the casino was delayed, however, because of a Gaming Commission investigation into Shenandoah president John Harlow Tucker for a 1975 securities fraud conviction. Tucker's gaming license was ultimately denied, and he was ordered to sell his $1.8-million stake in the property. Newton also pulled out, opting instead to buy the Aladdin casino. The Shenandoah's landlord, Allarco Holdings of Edmonton, took over the project, and sought new investors to buy or lease the hotel, which was losing $500,000 a month.

Allarco was acquired in January 1981 by Carma Developers, a Calgary-based real estate company. Carma spent over two years trying unsuccessfully to sell the Shenandoah, before deciding to seek a gaming license to open the casino itself. Nevada passed a law in June 1985 to enable foreign companies to receive gaming licenses, and, weeks later, Carma was the first to take advantage of the new law. The property was reopened and rebranded as the Bourbon Street Hotel and Casino.

=== Bourbon Street Hotel and Casino (1985-2005) ===
In January 1988, Carma sold Bourbon Street to Las Vegas Investors Ltd., a firm run by two top executives of Hotel Investors Trust. The following month, the firm turned around and sold the property to Hotel Investors Trust, along with the King 8 Hotel, for a total of $35 million.

An agreement was announced in July 1995 to sell the property to Crown Casino Corp. for $10 million. However, Crown abandoned the deal in November, losing a $500,000 deposit, citing the possibility of more attractive opportunities, a lack of attractive financing, and declining profits at the property.

In August 1996, Starwood sold the property to Tarsadia Hotels for $7.8 million in cash plus $1 million in assumed debt. Starwood cited a strategic focus on "full-service, high-quality hotels." Tarsadia closed the property's casino and laid off its 400 workers, avoiding the complication of applying for a gaming license for its owner, Tusher Patel, who was not a U.S. citizen. Patel planned to build a timeshare tower on the site, in partnership with an unidentified major casino company, but the plan was scrapped when the partner pulled out.

In August 1997, Tarsadia agreed to sell Bourbon Street to Florida Gaming Corp., a jai alai operator, for $13 million in cash plus $1.5 million in stock. The near-doubling of the hotel's value in the span of a year was attributed to rising property values on the Strip. Florida Gaming planned to spend $6.5 million renovating the site. However, the sale was never completed.

In April 2001, Tarsadia sold Bourbon Street to a partnership of Dallas-based real estate investor Michael Block, and the Red Sea Group of El Segundo, California, with a declared property value of $11 million. With the property losing money, the partners immediately began discussions to redevelop or sell it.

In 2003, Block began negotiating with Trevor Pearlman and Reagan Silber of Edge Resorts. Block bought Red Sea's stake in the partnership for $10.55 million and sold it to Pearlman the same day for $12.5 million. Four months later, Block sold his stake to Silber for $14 million. Block had not informed Red Sea of his negotiations with Edge, leading Red Sea to successfully sue Block.

Edge Resorts planned to build the W Las Vegas condo-hotel project on the site, in partnership with Starwood. However, even after buying an adjacent apartment complex, bringing the site to 8 acres total, they decided they needed more space, and bought a 21-acre lot on Harmon Avenue.

Edge sold Bourbon Street and adjacent properties to Harrah's Entertainment in March 2005. Records filed with the county listed the total property value at $60.6 million.

Harrah's decided to close Bourbon Street effective October 31, 2005. On October 18, however, a water main broke, threatening the building's structural integrity, and the property closed early. Demolition work began the following January, and the tower was imploded by Controlled Demolition, Inc. (CDI) on February 14, 2006.

Between 2005 and 2007, Harrah's had consolidated control of much of the east side of the central Strip, also acquiring the Imperial Palace, Barbary Coast, and much of the residential Flamingo Estates neighborhood north of Bourbon Street. CEO Gary Loveman envisioned a mega-resort called Epicentre for the company's 350 acres. As of 2020, the site is being used as a surface parking lot for employees of The Cromwell Las Vegas.

== Facilities ==
Bourbon Street had 166 hotel rooms, including 16 suites.

The casino was 15,000 square feet (1,400 m^{2}). As of 1995, it had 420 slot machines and 15 table games. By the time it closed in 2005, it had just 100 slot machines, managed by slot route operator United Coin.
