= W Las Vegas (canceled project) =

- Rendering of the W Las Vegas by Lacina Heitler Architects
- Interactive map of the W Las Vegas area

General information
- Status: Never built
- Type: Casino; Condominium; Hotel; Retail
- Location: Paradise, Nevada, Harmon Avenue, United States
- Coordinates: 36.109158°N 115.161672°W
- Opened: 2008 (planned)
- Cost: $2.5 billion
- Owner: Edge Resorts and Starwood

Technical details
- Floor count: 50

Design and construction
- Architecture firm: Lacina Heitler Architects; Klai Juba Architects; Charles Allem Designs
- Developer: Edge Resorts and Starwood

Other information
- Number of rooms: 3,000–4,000

W Las Vegas was a planned condo-hotel and casino resort near the Las Vegas Strip in Paradise, Nevada. It was announced in August 2005 as a joint venture between Edge Resorts and minority partner Starwood. The project was initially expected to cost $1.7 billion, and would include approximately 3,000 hotel, condo hotel, and residential units, as well as a 75,000 sq ft (7,000 m^{2}) casino, in addition to restaurants, nightclubs, and shopping. The project initially was to be built on 21 acres (8.5 ha) located east of the Las Vegas Strip. The cost of the project ultimately increased to $2.5 billion.

In June 2006, Edge Resorts purchased an adjacent 25-acre (10 ha) site that had been planned for the Las Ramblas Resort. Edge Resorts then planned to build Edge East, a boutique hotel district, on the newly acquired property to accompany W Las Vegas. The project was cancelled when Starwood pulled out of the partnership in May 2007.

== History ==
Since the launch of Starwood's first W Hotel in 1998, Ross Klein, the senior vice president and chief marketing officer of W Hotels, had wanted to open a W hotel in Las Vegas. However, such plans failed for years to materialize as Klein had difficulty finding an adequate location and partner at a time that would be ideal. In 2004, private investment group Edge Resorts began discussions with Starwood about jointly opening a W hotel in Las Vegas. At the time, Edge Resorts owned the Bourbon Street Hotel and Casino, but Starwood considered the building too small and in a poor location, wanting instead to have a potential W hotel on Harmon Avenue. Later that year, Edge Resorts purchased 2 acres (0.81 ha) of land at the northeast corner of Harmon Avenue and Koval Lane, occupied by the Ice nightclub. The following year, it purchased an additional 19 acres (7.7 ha) of adjacent land from D. R. Horton. The total cost of the 21-acre (8.5 ha) site was $108.1 million.

In August 2005, Starwood and Edge Resorts announced plans for a $1.7 billion joint project that would include a 75,000 sq ft (7,000 m^{2}) casino; approximately 3,000 hotel, condo hotel, and residential units; and 300,000 sq ft (28,000 m^{2}) of meeting space. The property would also include shops, a spa, and a gym. It would be Starwood's first W hotel to include a casino. Under the deal, Edge Resorts would have 75 percent control of the resort, while Starwood would own the remainder and would manage the hotel, to be known as W Las Vegas. The project would be built on the 21-acre site, located east of the Las Vegas Strip and near the Hard Rock Hotel and Casino. Its primary competitors were expected to be the Hard Rock, Mandalay Bay, the Palms, and Wynn Las Vegas. Investors for Edge Resorts were not concerned about the large amount of Las Vegas hotel condo projects announced up to that point. Residential sales were expected to begin in the fourth quarter of 2005, and a 2008 opening was scheduled. The project was still in the design phase at the time of the announcement.

In January 2006, it was announced that the project had received $232.5 million in pre-development financing from Société Générale Corporate and Investment Banking. Project details were announced in May 2006. The property would include two 50-story glass towers with a modern design, containing a combined total of 4,000 hotel and condo-hotel units, ranging from 500 sq ft (46 m^{2}) to 3,000 sq ft (280 m^{2}). Prices would start at $650,000, and the total cost of the project had increased to $2.5 billion. It was also announced that Las Vegas' M.J. Dean Construction had been hired as the general contractor, while Las Vegas-based Klai Juba Architects would work with the New York-based Lacina Heitler Architects to design the project along with Charles Allem Designs. Utility installation work had already begun early that month, and M.J. Dean Construction had begun building a $5 million residential sales center.

In June 2006, it was announced that an adjacent 25-acre (10 ha) site, planned for the future Las Ramblas Resort, had been sold to Edge Resorts for $202 million. Edge Resorts planned to construct a boutique hotel district known as Edge East on the newly acquired property to accompany W Las Vegas. The project was also planned to include nightclubs and 10 restaurants. Later that month, Edge put 63 acres (25 ha) of recently purchased land (later the site of the Allegiant Stadium) up for sale to pay for W Las Vegas and Edge East. In December 2006, Edge Resorts hired Credit Suisse to evaluate offers from people and groups that were interested in partnering with Edge Resorts and Starwood on the project, as rising construction costs and the additional land meant that a third partner would be required to help finance the project. At the time, Edge Resorts denied rumors that Starwood would pull out of the project.

W Las Vegas was cancelled in May 2007, after Starwood pulled out of the project. Edge Resorts planned to sell the land, stating that the project "could not overcome numerous significant challenges." Up to that time, 750 residential units had been reserved; refunds were issued to people who reserved units. In August 2007, the site was sold to a joint venture group that was led by the Africa Israel Group and included Edge Resorts. In January 2009, plans were announced to build the world's largest hotel on the site, with 6,745 rooms, as well as a casino and retail complex. The project was known as "Edge (Las Vegas)", with Edge among the partners to have a stake in the project. The joint venture defaulted on loans eight months later, and the property remained vacant.

Lenders foreclosed on the land in 2014. It was sold eight years later to Liberty Media, the parent company of Formula One. A 300,000 sq ft (28,000 m^{2}), four-story paddock structure was built on the land for the 2023 Las Vegas Grand Prix.

== Other versions ==
Sometime before 2015, Starwood and Station Casinos held discussions about developing a W hotel on the site of Station's Wild Wild West Gambling Hall & Hotel.

At the SLS Las Vegas on the north end of the Las Vegas Strip, Starwood operated one of the resort's hotel towers, the former LUX Tower, as a separate hotel known as W Las Vegas. It operated from December 2016 to August 2018.

W Las Vegas at Mandalay Bay made its debut in 2024.
