= Las Ramblas Resort =

Las Ramblas
- Interactive map of the Las Ramblas area
- Etymology: La Rambla, Barcelona

General information
- Status: Never built
- Type: Casino; Condominium; Hotel; Retail
- Location: Paradise, Nevada, Harmon Avenue, United States
- Coordinates: 36.110000°N 115.158026°W
- Groundbreaking: September 2006 (planned)
- Estimated completion: June 2007 (first phase)
- Cost: $3 billion
- Owner: Centra Properties; The Related Companies

Technical details
- Size: 8 million sq ft (740,000 m^{2})
- Floor count: 28-32 (early estimate)

Design and construction
- Architecture firm: Arquitectonica
- Developer: Centra Properties; The Related Companies

Other information
- Number of rooms: 4,400

The Las Ramblas Resort was a proposed mixed-use project that was to be constructed in Paradise, Nevada. The project was to be located on 25 acres (10 ha) of land on Harmon Avenue, east of the Las Vegas Strip. Las Ramblas would have included 11 towers encompassing a hotel and condominium residences for a total of 4,400 units, including 300 hotel rooms. Other amenities would have included a small casino, retail stores, a spa and health club, and nightclubs. The complex would have totaled 8 million sq ft (740,000 m^{2}), and was designed by Arquitectonica. The design was inspired by La Rambla, an open-air street in Barcelona.

Las Ramblas was announced in March 2005, as a $2 billion joint project between Centra Properties and The Related Companies. Actor George Clooney and nightclub developer Rande Gerber signed on to invest in the project in August 2005, at which point new amenities had been added to the project that increased its cost to $3 billion. Las Ramblas was scheduled to begin construction in September 2006, with its first phase opening in June 2007. The property for the proposed project was sold for $202 million in June 2006, to Starwood, the developers of the adjacent W Las Vegas resort that was also cancelled.

== History ==
=== Announcement ===
On March 11, 2005, Centra Properties announced that it had closed escrow on the 996-unit Harbor Island apartments, as well as 14 four-plex buildings, all located on 25 acres of land on Harmon Avenue, east of the Aladdin resort on the Las Vegas Strip and adjacent to the Hard Rock Hotel and Casino. The cost of the property totaled $85 million. In partnership with The Related Companies, Centra also announced plans to demolish the buildings and replace them with a $2 billion resort complex consisting of high-rise condominiums and a boutique hotel, with the possibility of a casino as well. Kenny Sullivan, a co-owner of Centra, said, "Our intentions are to do an amazing project," noting that the 25-acre property was significantly larger in comparison to other projects the company was working on in the Las Vegas Valley.

Sullivan said, "The way we're designing this, our intention is to build a Main Street down the middle of the property, like Las Ramblas in Spain, then with residential above it. It will be like living in New York City, with lots of activity down on the street." Early designs depicted a complex of 10 to 12 high-rise buildings, expected to be 28 to 32 stories high, although an exact height had not been decided at that time. The complex would include retail stores and up to 3,500 condominium units. The complex was one of many projects that were being planned along Harmon Avenue. Centra expected to submit its plans to Clark County at the end of March 2005, with its first building expected to be under construction in the first quarter of 2006.

=== Clooney and Gerber ===
In August 2005, it was announced that actor George Clooney and nightclub developer Rande Gerber had signed on to invest a significant, undisclosed amount of their money into the project, now known as Las Ramblas. Clooney was a regular visitor to Las Vegas and a friend of Gerber, who had developed clubs in Nevada, New York, and California. Clooney, while on a flight to Las Vegas to film Ocean's Eleven (2001), discussed with Gerber the idea of opening a resort in the city; Gerber later recalled that they discussed "how great it would be to open a hotel and casino and bring back our perception of Old Vegas, with the glamour and romance, our interpretation of the Rat Pack era." The pair continued to hold discussions about developing a project. Clooney and Gerber tried to convince Ocean's Eleven actor Brad Pitt to join the project and be involved in some of the architectural designs, although he ultimately declined. The project was designed by Arquitectonica.

In addition to financing, Clooney and Gerber planned to purchase condominium units in the Las Ramblas project as well, and also planned to be actively involved in its design. At that time, the project's cost had increased to $3 billion, with new amenities that included a casino, spa, health club, and restaurants. Through his company, Gerber planned to develop restaurants, clubs, and lounges for the project. Clooney also planned for the resort to include a movie theater that was capable of holding Hollywood-style movie premieres. Construction was now scheduled to begin in mid-2006, with the project expected to ultimately include 11 high-rise buildings. The first phase was expected to be complete by 2008, and would include a 300-room hotel with an additional 370 condominium-hotel units, a second tower with approximately 560 condominium-hotel units, and two gateway condominium buildings with 285 and 344 units respectively. Upon completion, the complex would ultimately offer 300 hotel rooms, 2,764 condominium units, 1,326 condominium-hotel units, and 19 bungalows.

Reservations were being accepted at that time. The project was expected to total 8 million sq ft (740,000 m^{2}), with a total of 4,400 units. The complex was described as largely residential, while the retail portions would potentially range between 250,000 sq ft (23,000 m^{2}) and 500,000 sq ft (46,000 m^{2}). According to reports at the time, the small casino would have either been 48,000 sq ft (4,500 m^{2}), or would have ranged between 30,000 sq ft (2,800 m^{2}) and 40,000 sq ft (3,700 m^{2}). A casino management instructor at UNLV told the Las Vegas Sun that he believed that the developers had failed to realize the true potential of including a larger casino. Sullivan said the small casino would not attempt to appeal to high rollers, stating that they "have their homes on the Strip. That's where they belong and the big casinos can afford to handle the wins and losses. When you have a smaller, more intimate casino like ours, that's not really something you can do." Centra and The Related Companies planned to select two separate management companies to operate the hotel and the casino, although the names of prospective applicants were not disclosed.

At the time, Clooney said that the developers were considering a dress code for the casino "so that it will feel like you are walking into a more formal Las Vegas of a different age or a classic Monte Carlo casino." Some experts believed that enforcing a dress code would decrease the number of potential customers to the casino by appealing only to a small customer base, while a member of the Nevada Gaming Control Board's enforcement division was unsure if the dress code would be legal because of a law that required gambling to be conducted within view of the general public. Sullivan said that Clooney wanted to bring elegance to the project, but acknowledged that Clooney's idea of a dress code would not work in a Las Vegas casino. Clooney mentioned the proposed dress code during an appearance on the Late Show with David Letterman in September 2005, saying, "No cutoffs, culottes or espadrilles." That month, Mark A. Brown, who formerly operated three of Donald Trump's casinos in Atlantic City, New Jersey, was reportedly in consideration for the Las Ramblas project.

In January 2006, Related confirmed that it would proceed with plans to build Las Ramblas, despite the cancellation of one of its high-rise condominium projects in Las Vegas. Clooney spoke about the project during an appearance on Larry King Live on February 15, 2006, stating that it would be "the type of place where you dress up to see a show. The kind of casino that doesn't exist anymore." In addition, Clooney said he would donate 25 percent of his profits from Las Ramblas to African relief. The following day, casino executive Bobby Baldwin – who was in charge of MGM's $7 billion CityCenter project – criticized the Las Ramblas project: "I think that's been about as successful as me acting in movies."

=== Cancellation ===
On March 29, 2006, it was reported that the Las Ramblas was no longer accepting reservations, and that the property was under contract to be purchased by Edge Resorts Group, a partner in the development of the planned W Las Vegas, located on adjacent land. Clooney had reportedly invested $10 million in the Las Ramblas project. On April 5, 2006, Gerber responded to reports that the property had been put up for sale: "There are some great opportunities, including selling the land. If that happens, George and I will invest in something else in Las Vegas". By May 2006, the project had been cancelled, due to decreased sales and rising construction costs.

On June 4, 2006, it was announced that the property had been sold to Edge Resorts for $202 million. Clooney said he would donate his profits from the sale to the African Debt Relief Project. Edge Resorts planned to construct a boutique hotel district known as Edge East on the property to accompany W Las Vegas. Marty Burger of Related said that for the company, Las Ramblas "became more about gaming than the residential community we were trying to build. We're the largest developer of residential property in the country, and we saw ourselves getting away from what we do best." Groundbreaking on Las Ramblas had been scheduled to begin in September 2006, with the first phase scheduled to open in June 2007, to accompany Clooney's new film, Ocean's Thirteen, which he wanted to premiere in Las Vegas.

In 2010, Jorge Perez of Related said that selling the property was one of the smartest decisions he had ever made: "The market was clearly showing signs of decline, and the demand for construction services was so great that construction prices had been inflated to the point of making our project unfeasible. Instead of taking the immense risk, I decided to sell the land for a huge profit." The vacant land was put up for sale in 2015, and has been sold several times since then. The apartment complex, since renamed as The Harmon at 370, remains on the property as of 2023.
