= Tunica Roadhouse Hotel =

Hotel and spa in Tunica Resorts, Mississippi

Coordinates: 34.847180°N 90.328597°W

- Interactive map of Tunica Roadhouse Hotel
- Location: Tunica Resorts, Mississippi; 1107 Casino Center Drive
- Opened: 1994
- Closed: January 26, 2019 (casino); January 2, 2020 (hotel)
- Theme: Roadhouse
- No. of rooms: 134 suites
- Permanent shows: River Stage Showbar
- Signature attractions: Mechanical bull, Beer pong
- Notable restaurants: Range Steakhouse & Bar; Big Kitchen Buffet
- Casino type: Riverboat casino
- Owner: Vici Properties
- Operating license holder: Caesars Entertainment
- Previous names: Sheraton Casino and Hotel Tunica (1994–2009); Tunica Roadhouse Casino & Hotel (2009–2019)
- Renovated in: 2009
- Website: caesars.com/tunica-roadhouse

The Tunica Roadhouse Hotel was a hotel and spa located in Tunica Resorts, Mississippi.

Until the casino portion of the property closed in January 2019, it was one of three casinos located in Casino Center, along with its sister property Horseshoe Casino Tunica and MGM Mirage's Gold Strike Tunica. The casino featured 36 table games and more than 1,300 video poker and slot machines located on two floors. The casino (as well as the adjacent hotel, which Is now permanently closed) was themed to resemble a roadhouse, and was marketed as a place to "get wild", housing many features unique to Tunica casinos, such as a mechanical bull, as well as beer pong and other "bar games". The concept debuted December 18, 2009.

The hotel had 134 suites, all of which featured a whirlpool bathtub. Two restaurants and a buffet were also on the premises.

As of January 2, 2020, the hotel ceased operations.

As of January 2026, demolition of the property is completed.

== History ==
The property was originally opened by ITT Sheraton in 1994 as Sheraton Casino and Hotel Tunica. In 1998, after ITT Sheraton was acquired by Starwood, its casinos were sold to Park Place Entertainment, newly formed from the merger of Hilton's gaming unit and Grand Casinos. At this point, Sheraton Tunica and the former Grand Casino Tunica (later re-branded to Harrah's) first came under the same ownership.

Park Place was renamed as Caesars Entertainment and then was acquired by Harrah's Entertainment in 2004, soon after Harrah's had acquired the adjacent Horseshoe Casino in a separate deal. To prevent the newly combined company from owning five of the Tunica market's nine casinos, Harrah's chose to sell the previous Harrah's Mardi Gras (now Resorts Casino Tunica) and Bally's Casino Tunica (now 1st Jackpot Casino Tunica) to Colony Capital.

Despite the numerous ownership changes, the resort continued operating under the Sheraton banner until December 14, 2009, when the Roadhouse name and theme were adopted. As the Sheraton, the casino/hotel featured a Black Forest theme.

Harrah's Entertainment changed its name to Caesars Entertainment in 2010 and closed Harrah's Tunica in 2014, leaving the Horseshoe and the Roadhouse as its only two casinos operating in the area.

In October 2017, ownership of the property was transferred to Vici Properties as part of a corporate spin-off, and it was leased back to Caesars Entertainment.

In November 2018, Caesars announced that the Roadhouse casino would close in January 2019, though the hotel would continue to operate. The closure was attributed to declining gaming business in the Tunica area resulting from increased competition, particularly from casinos in Arkansas.

Gaming operations at Tunica Roadhouse ceased at 11:59pm on January 26, 2019, reducing the number of operating casinos in Tunica County to seven.

The Tunica Roadhouse hotel ceased operations on January 2, 2020.

== Gallery ==
Logo for the Sheraton, 2004-2009

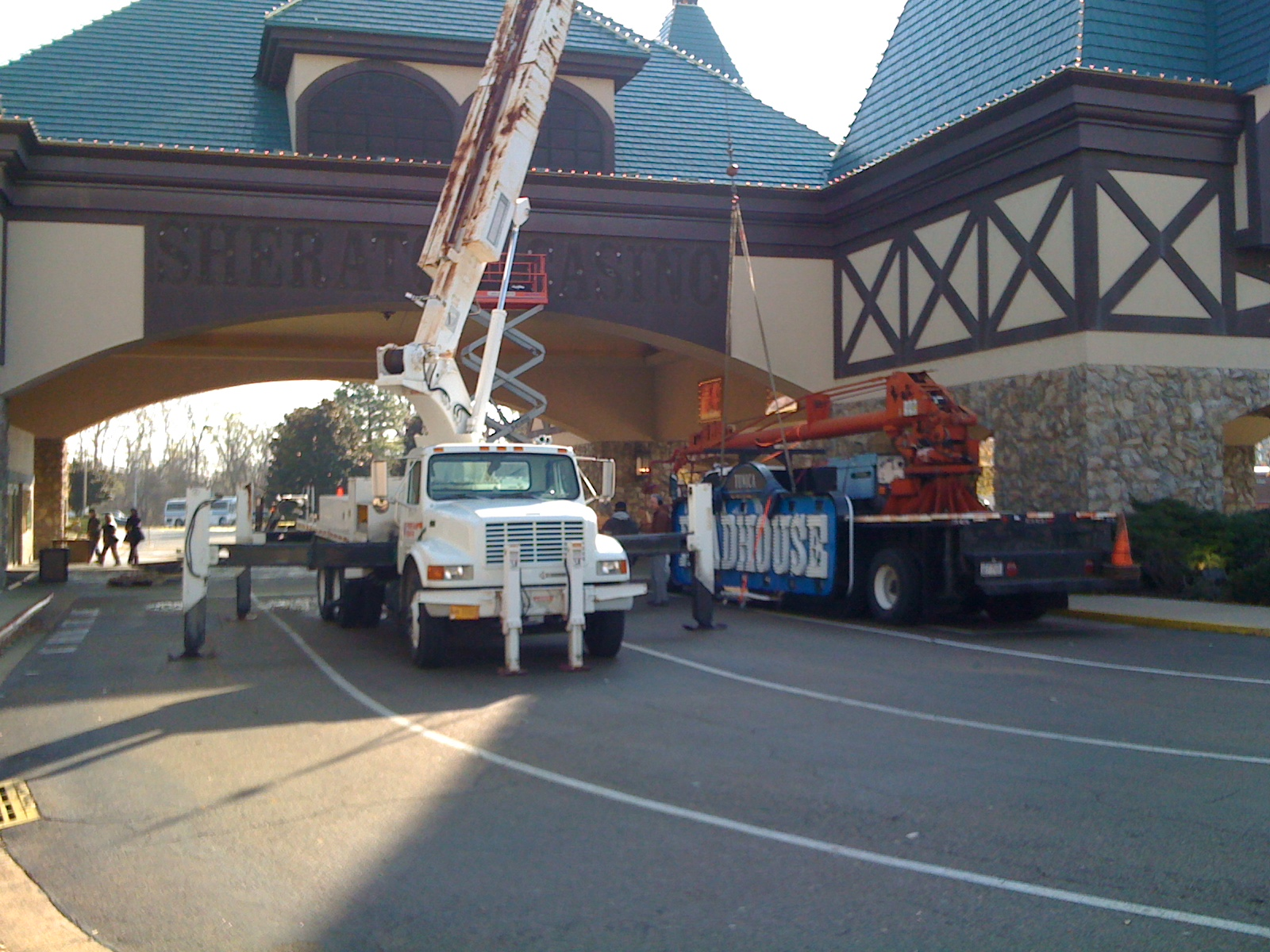
Crews remove the signage for "Sheraton" and replace it with signage bearing the new "Roadhouse" name on December 9, 2009.

== See also ==
- List of Caesars Entertainment properties
- List of casinos in Mississippi
