= Hard Rock Casino Cincinnati =

Gaming complex in Hamilton County, Ohio, U.S.

Coordinates: 39.107948°N 84.506493°W

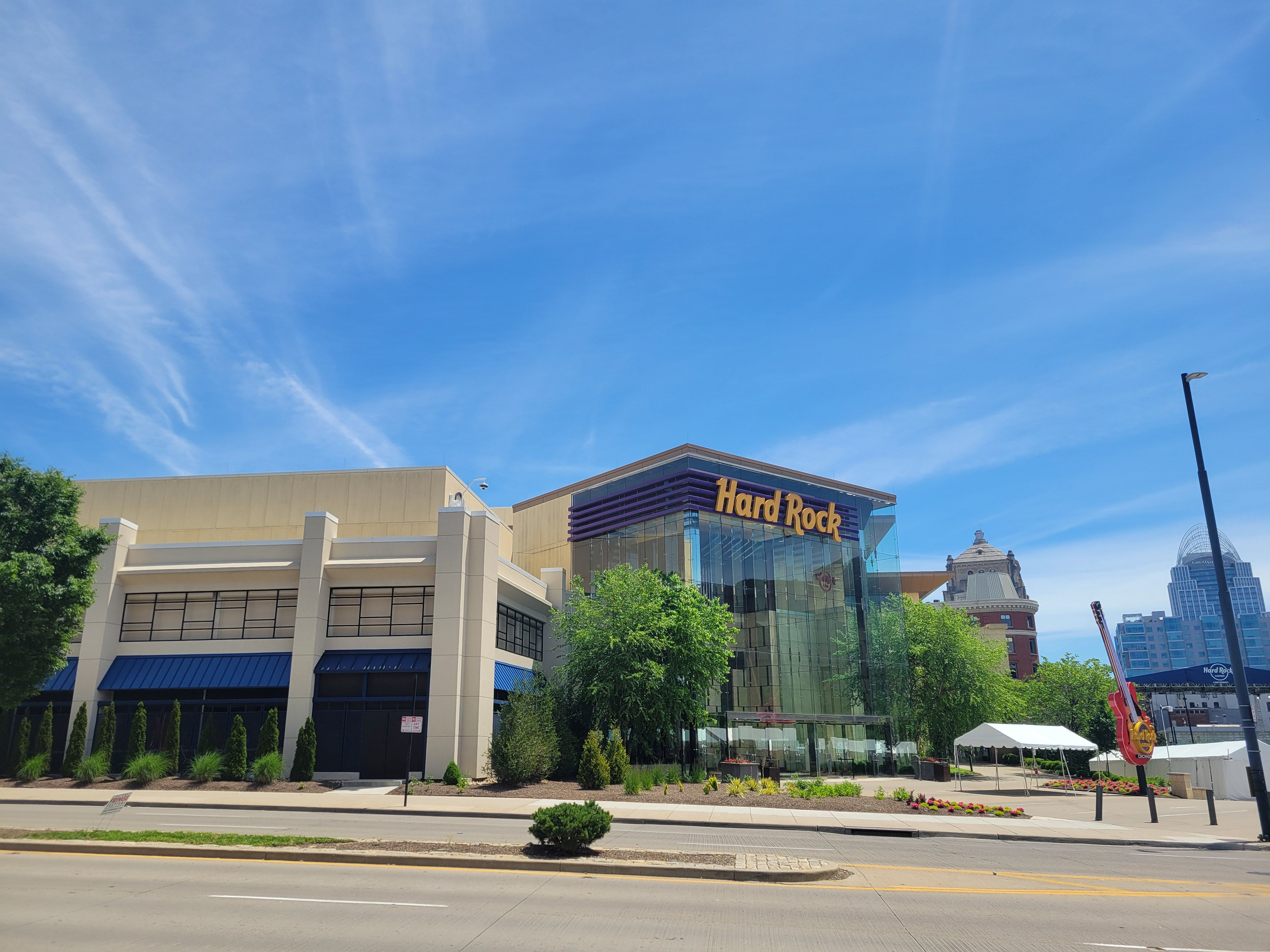
- North view from Central Parkway (May 2025)
- Interactive map of Hard Rock Casino Cincinnati
- Location: Cincinnati, Ohio, U.S.; 1000 Broadway Street
- Opened: March 4, 2013; 13 years ago
- Theme: Rock and roll
- Gaming space: 100,000 square feet (9,300 m^{2})
- Signature attractions: Hard Rock Event Center
- Notable restaurants: Hard Rock Cafe; Council Oak Steakhouse; Bricked Oven Pizza
- Casino type: Land-based
- Owner: Vici Properties
- Operating license holder: Hard Rock International
- Website: casino.hardrock.com/cincinnati

Hard Rock Casino Cincinnati (formerly Jack Cincinnati Casino) is a casino in Cincinnati, Ohio, owned by Vici Properties and operated by Hard Rock International. It opened in late 2013 as the Horseshoe Cincinnati.

== Overview ==
The two-story casino is 100,000 square feet (9,300 m^{2}) and has 2,000 slot machines, 85 table games and a 31-table World Series of Poker room. It is located on a 23-acre (9.3 ha) site on the northeast side of Downtown Cincinnati. Brick'd Pizza, Hard Rock Cafe, Council Oak Steaks & Seafood, and Constant Grind are located inside the facility.

Gross casino revenues are taxed at 33%, one of the highest rates in the nation for a resort casino with this level of investment. Portions of the tax revenue are designated for public school districts; the four host cities; all 88 state counties; the Ohio State Racing Commission; law enforcement training; and research and treatment of problem gambling and substance abuse.

== History ==
Ohio voters approved a state constitutional amendment in November 2009 authorizing one casino in each of the state's four largest cities: Cleveland, Cincinnati, Columbus and Toledo. It was the fifth statewide vote to legalize gambling in Ohio over 20 years.

Construction at the site formerly known as Broadway Commons began in February 2011. The Horseshoe Casino opened on March 4, 2013. It was the last of the four voter-approved full-service casinos to open in the state.

Horseshoe Cincinnati was initially owned and operated by Rock Ohio Caesars, a joint venture between Caesars Entertainment and Dan Gilbert's Rock Gaming. Rock Ohio Caesars also opened Ohio’s first casino, Horseshoe Casino Cleveland, in May 2012. Rock Ohio Caesars was the first operator to be licensed by the Ohio Casino Control Commission on May 2, 2012.

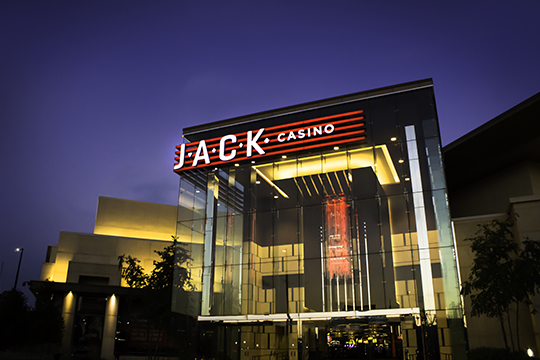
Jack Cincinnati Casino in 2017

The property was rebranded as Jack Cincinnati Casino in June 2016, as part of Rock Gaming's rebrand to Jack Entertainment.

In 2019, Jack Entertainment sold the property for $745 million to Vici Properties and Hard Rock International, with Vici acquiring the land and buildings for $558 million and Hard Rock buying the operating business for $187 million. Hard Rock leased the casino from Vici for $43 million per year, and stated that it would rebrand the property as Hard Rock Casino Cincinnati.

== See also ==
- List of casinos in Ohio
