= Caesars Golf Macau =

Caesars Golf Macau 澳門凱撒高爾夫
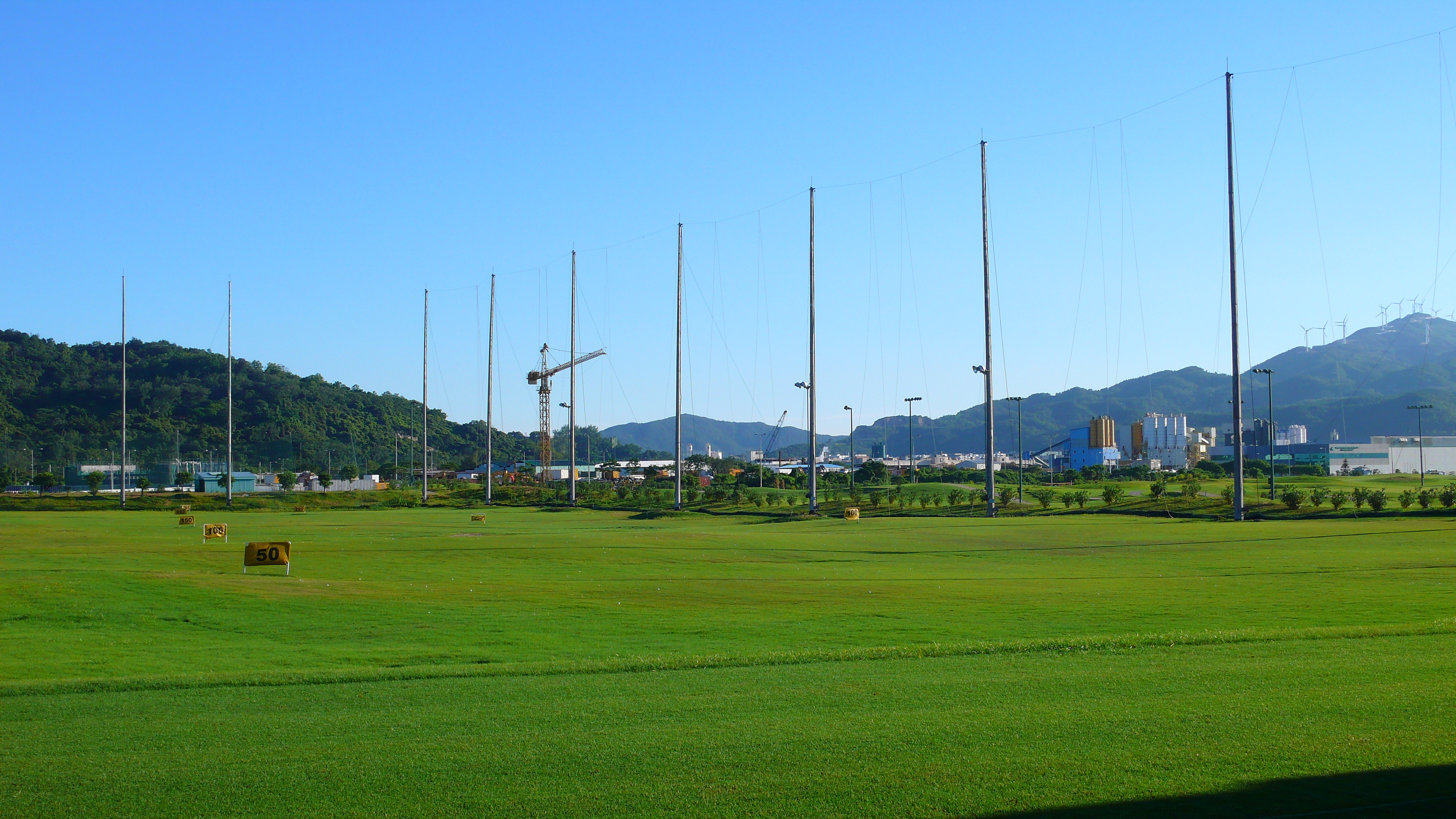
- Interactive map of Caesars Golf Macau 澳門凱撒高爾夫
- 22°8′7.1″N 113°33′27.7″E

Club information
- Location: Cotai, Macau, China
- Established: 1978
- Type: Public
- Owner: Pearl Dynasty Investments
- Tota holes: 36
- Tournaments: Senior Championship
- Website: www.caesarsgolf.mo/en

Lakes Course
- Par: 71
- Length: 7131
- Course rating: 74.2

Desert Course
- Par: 72
- Length: 6945
- Course rating: 73.3

Macau International Golf (Chinese: 澳門國際高爾夫) is a golf course in Cotai, Macau, China . Formerly known as the Orient Golf (Macau) Club, Harrah's Entertainment (later Caesars Entertainment) purchased the 175-acre (71 ha) property during the casino boom in 2007. Harrah's later renamed it Caesars Golf.

In 2013, Caesars sold the golf course to Pearl Dynasty Investments for $438 million.

== See also ==
- Sport in Macau
- Cotai Strip
