= Bill's Casino Lake Tahoe =

Casino in Nevada, United States

Coordinates: 38.9611°N 119.9405°W

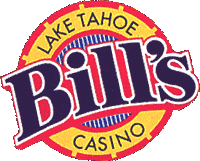

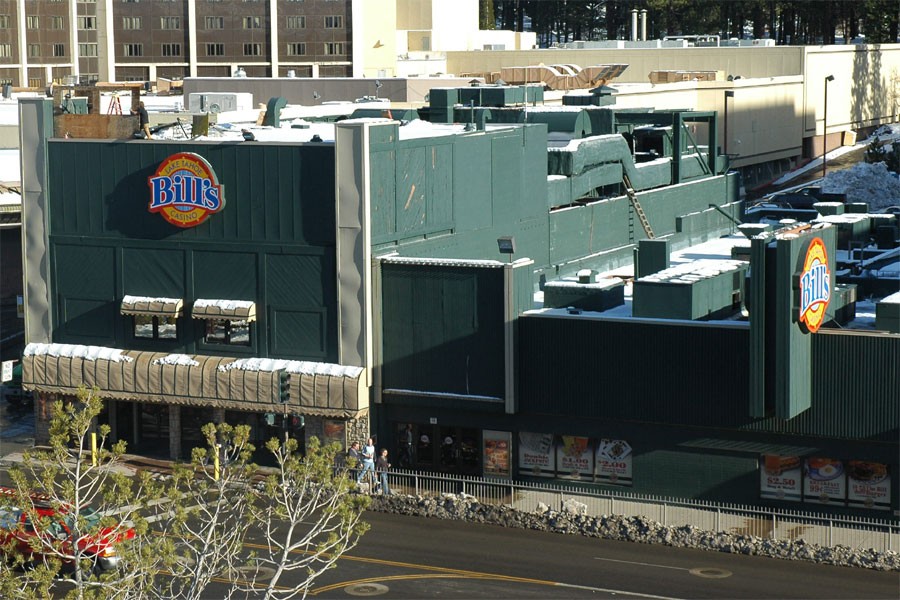
- Interactive map of Bill's Casino Lake Tahoe
- Location: Stateline, Nevada; 27 Hwy 50
- Opened: July 1, 1987
- Closed: January 4, 2010; 16 years ago
- Gaming space: 16,500 sq ft (1,530 m^{2})
- Signature attractions: Tahoe Tattoo
- Notable restaurants: Subway
- Casino type: Land-based
- Owner: Harrah's Entertainment
- Previous names: Harrah's Sports Casino, Barneys
- Renovated in: 2006

Bill's Lake Tahoe was a casino located in Stateline, Nevada owned and operated by and connected to next-door Harrah's Lake Tahoe.

== History ==
Bill's opened during the 50th Anniversary of Harrah's in 1987 and was named in honor of William F. Harrah. There was no hotel, although there was an on-site tattoo parlor. Bill's also hosted UFC pay per view fights at all of its bars. In January 2007, Bill's became the only non-smoking casino in Tahoe. After years of business decline, Bill's Casino closed its doors for good January 4, 2010.

The site and surrounding parcels of land were purchased by attorney Michael Laub in March 2010 for US$5.22 million with the intention of turning the location into a large strip club. It was later reported that the site would be transformed into a mall including a pharmacy, a jewellery store, a tattoo studio, a Pilates studio, a clothing store, another casino and a restaurant and bar.

The Tahoe Daily Tribune reported on a safe was discovered behind a false wall during renovations during August 2011.

On August 23, a posting on reddit by the son of the purchaser of Bill's casino prematurely stated the opening of the safe will be documented on reddit. The Oprah Winfrey Network gained exclusive access to the opening of the safe for the TV show Found, that is in development and the broadcast date is not known. The safe was opened September 14, 2011, in the presence of the Douglas County Sheriff's Office investigator, but did not find anything relevant to an investigation.
