= Jack Thistledown Racino =

Race track in Ohio, United States of America

Coordinates: 41.4371°N 81.5303°W

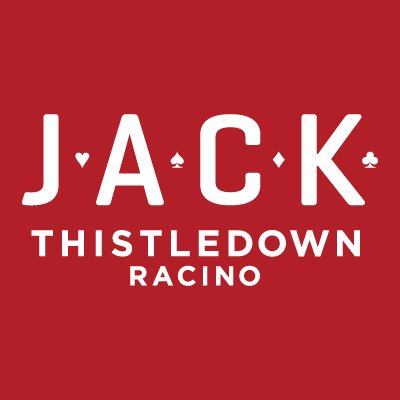

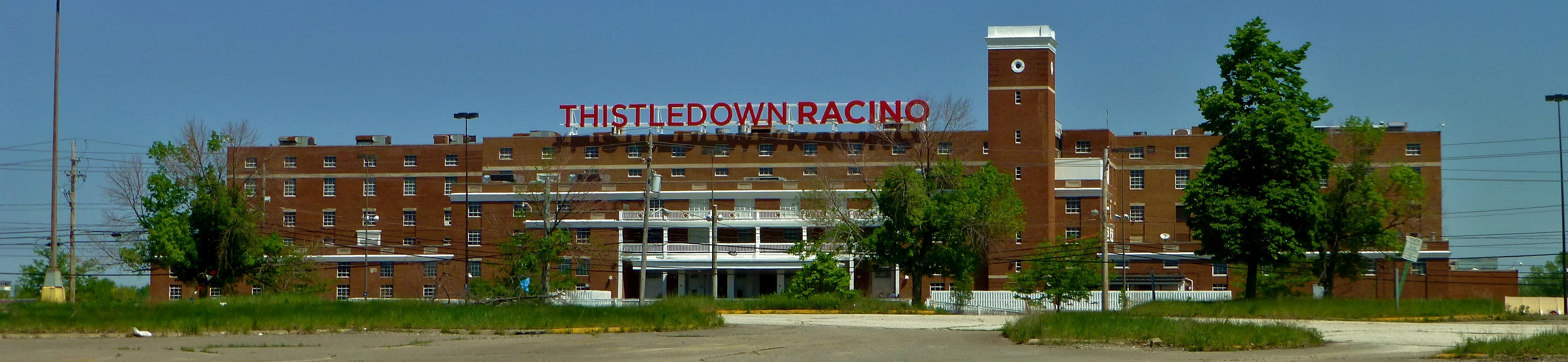
- Exterior of Jack Thistledown Racino
- Interactive map of Jack Thistledown Racino
- Location: North Randall, Ohio; 21501 Emery Road
- Opened: April 9, 2013 (as casino)
- Gaming space: 57,000 sq ft (5,300 m^{2})
- Casino type: Racino
- Owner: Vici Properties
- Operating license holder: Jack Entertainment
- Website: jackentertainment.com/thistledown
Jack Thistledown Racino
- Interactive map of Jack Thistledown Racino
- Date opened: 1931
- Race type: Thoroughbred
- Course type: Flat, Harness Racing
- Notable races: Cradle Stakes; Bassinet Stakes

Jack Thistledown Racino is a racino in North Randall, Ohio, at the outskirts of the city of Cleveland. It is owned by Vici Properties and operated by Jack Entertainment.

== History and Information ==
The track came under the regulation of the Ohio Racing Commission in 1931 when it was formed. The track is the home of the Ohio Derby, the only graded stakes race in Ohio.

The track races under the Ohio 7/7 Program which means that live racing is held at two locations in the state at the same time. During the summer Thistledown races seven races on a card and Belterra Park (formerly River Downs) races the other seven. In September, Beulah Park takes over for Belterra Park. Ohio racing is dark January to March. The track declined in recent years due to summertime competition and the lack of slot machines that neighboring tracks have.

In 2007, Thistledown's parent company, Magna Entertainment, announced that the racetrack was for sale. As a result of staggering losses in which Magna Entertainment reported net losses of $87.4 million in 2006, $105.3 million in 2005 and $95.6 million in 2004, and has an accumulated deficit of $393.8 million as of March 31, 2007, Magna Entertainment stated: "Accordingly, the company's ability to continue as a going concern is in substantial doubt and is dependent on the company generating cash flows that are adequate to sustain the operations of the business, renew or extend current financing arrangements and maintain its obligations with respect to secured and unsecured creditors, none of which is assured...". Once-thriving Thistledown, which hosts the $300,000 Ohio Derby, posted a pretax loss of $4.5 million in 2006. Thistledown and parent company, Magna Entertainment, recently filed for Chapter 11 bankruptcy.

Thistledown was purchased in 2010 by Harrah's Entertainment (now Caesars Entertainment) for $43 million. The track was subsequently contributed to a Caesars joint venture with Rock Gaming in Summer 2012.

In June 2012, the State of Ohio inked a memorandum of understanding authorizing the state's seven racetracks to offer video lottery terminals (VLTs), and permitted some tracks to relocate to less gaming-concentrated areas of the state.

In August 2012, Rock Ohio Caesars announced plans to invest $88 million to develop a racino at the existing North Randall site. Enhancements to the facility include transforming the main floor of ThistleDown’s grandstand into a 57,000 sq. ft. gaming space that will offer approximately 1,150 VLTs. Plans also included a 60-seat restaurant, two food court outlets, and a lounge.

Rock Gaming acquired Caesars Entertainment's 20% stake in Rock Ohio Caesars in February 2015, and later in the year announced that it would assume management of the properties, including Thistledown. Rock Gaming announced in February 2016 that the company and its casinos would rebrand under the Jack name. The racino closed for a day in March 2016 to undergo its transition to the Jack name and management.

In 2020, Jack sold Thistledown in a leaseback deal to Vici Properties, with Vici buying Thistledown and Jack Cleveland Casino for a total of $843 million, and renting the two properties back to Jack for $66 million per year.

On March 13, 2020, the track was closed until further notice following the directive from the State of Ohio and to comply with the Director of Ohio Department of Health's Order related to mass gatherings. One year later, the facility had record breaking revenues in March 2021 after all restrictions were lifted.

== Physical Attributes ==
The track has a one-mile dirt oval. There is no turf course.

== Racing ==
The track's premier race is the Grade III Ohio Derby. The track also hosts numerous overnight handicaps and minor stakes during its April to September racing season. Ungraded handicaps and stakes run in 2010 are:

- Angenora Stakes
- Dr. T. F. Classen Memorial Stakes
- Mike Rowland Memorial Handicap
- J. William (Bill) Petro Memorial Handicap
- Cleveland Gold Cup
- Rose DeBartolo Memorial Stakes
- George Lewis Memorial Stakes
- Cleveland Kindergarten Stakes
- Ohio Derby
- Miss Ohio Stakes
- Governor's Buckeye Cup
- Best of Ohio Distaff
- Best of Ohio Endurance
- Best of Ohio Sprint
- Juvenile Stakes
- Honey Jay Stakes

== See also ==
- List of casinos in Ohio
- Northfield Park
