= W Las Vegas =

43-story 1,117-room luxury suite hotel in Las Vegas

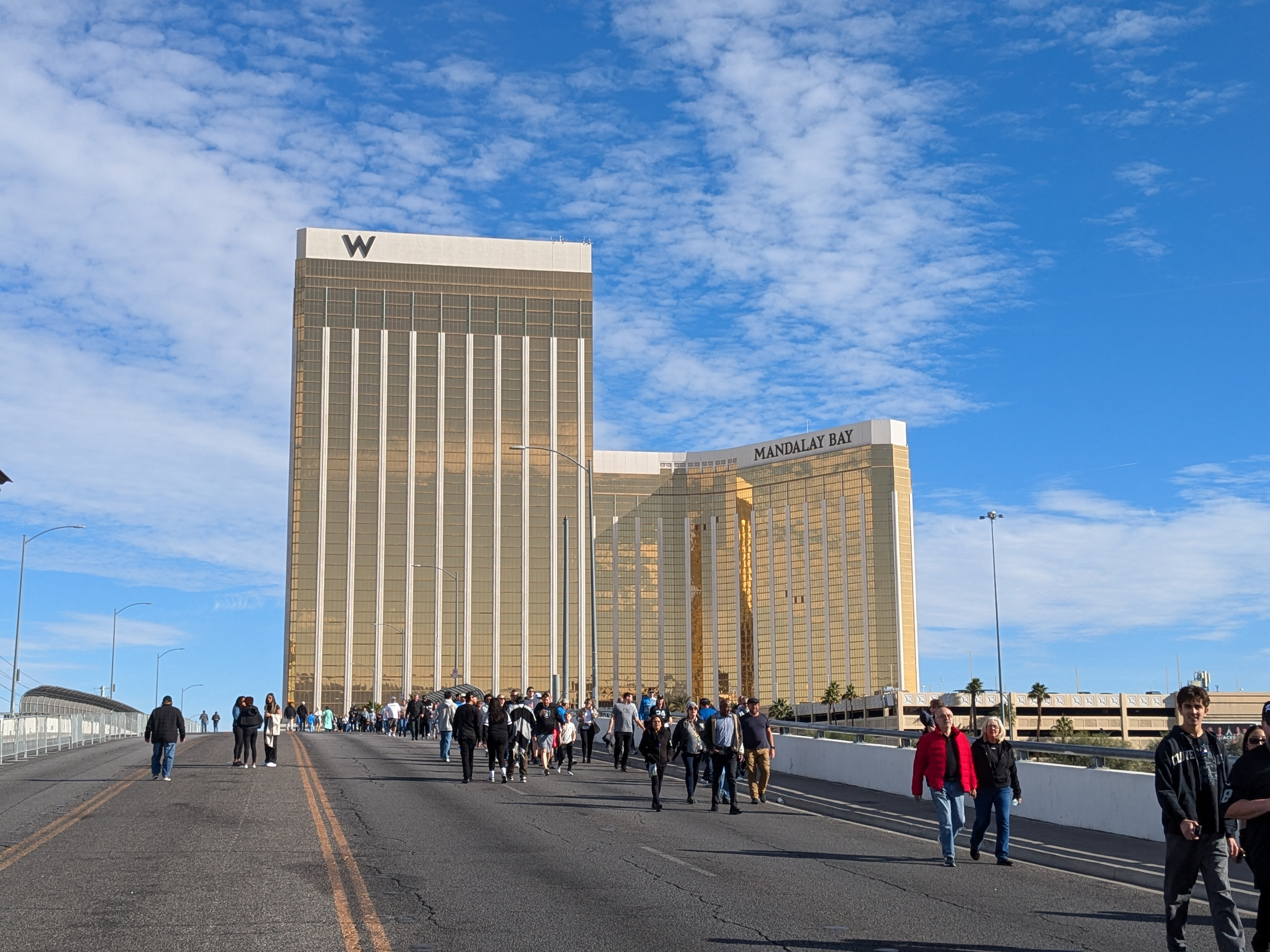
- The hotel in 2025
- Interactive map of the W Las Vegas area
- Former names: THEhotel (2003–2014); Delano Las Vegas (2014–2024)

General information
- Status: Operating
- Location: Paradise, Nevada, U.S., 3940 South Las Vegas Boulevard
- Coordinates: 36°05′35″N 115°10′40″W
- Topped-out: October 17, 2003
- Opening: December 17, 2003; 22 years ago
- Renovated: 2014
- Owner: MGM Resorts International
- Operator: W Hotels

Technical details
- Floor count: 43
- Floor area: 420 m^{2} (4,500 sq ft)

Other information
- Number of suites: 1,117
- Number of restaurants: 2

Website
- wlasvegas.mgmresorts.com

W Las Vegas is a luxury suite hotel that is owned and operated by MGM Resorts International, and is part of Marriott International's W Hotels brand. It is located within the Mandalay Bay complex on the Las Vegas Strip in Paradise, Nevada, United States. The hotel is 43 stories and includes 1,117 rooms. It opened on December 17, 2003, as THEhotel at Mandalay Bay.

In 2012, owner MGM Resorts International announced a partnership with Morgans Hotel Group to rebrand the hotel as Delano Las Vegas. Construction to rebrand the hotel began in April 2014. Several floors were worked on at a time, allowing much of the hotel to remain open during renovations. The Delano held its grand opening ceremonies in September 2014. The hotel includes an Alain Ducasse restaurant called "Rivea" and a lounge called "Skyfall", both located at the top of the hotel. The hotel was rebranded again as W Las Vegas on December 18, 2024.

== History ==
On May 23, 2002, the Mandalay Resort Group announced plans to build an all-suite hotel tower connecting to the company's Mandalay Bay resort on the Las Vegas Strip. The new tower's target clientele was attendees to the Mandalay Bay Convention Center, scheduled to open in January 2003. The tower would cost between $200 million and $225 million, with groundbreaking scheduled for September 2002. The tower's cost was later increased to $250 million.

=== THEhotel ===
In September 2003, Mandalay Resort Group announced that the tower's then-scheduled Thanksgiving opening would be delayed to late December 2003. The company also announced that the tower, located northwest of the main resort, would be named "THE hotel at Mandalay Bay". Mandalay Resort Group spokesman John Marz said, "We put some names out in front of the public and tested their response. THE hotel at Mandalay Bay is all about style. It's fresh and new." The tower would be marketed as a separate property from the Mandalay Bay, and would have its own porte-cochère, check-in area, restaurants, employee uniforms, and spa. The tower was topped off on October 17, 2003, and Mandalay Resort Group announced that the tower's name would be spelled "THEhotel at Mandalay Bay".

The hotel hosted more than 100 local reporters for a media preview the night before its official opening on December 17, 2003. The hotel did not have gambling, but provided access to the nearby casino at the Mandalay Bay. Although the gold-paned, 43-story tower had the same exterior appearance as the main resort, its interior design was entirely different. The company stated, "While Mandalay Bay represents an idyllic tropical paradise, THEhotel embraces modern architecture, contemporary design and comfortable surroundings." The new tower employed approximately 700 people. The hotel included original artwork by Jasper Johns, Andy Warhol, and Arturo Herrera. Included in the hotel's public areas were pieces by Robert Rauschenberg, Richard Serra, Valérie Belin, and Donald Judd. In January 2005, the hotel was among other establishments to win AAA's Four Diamond Award. In 2006, the lettering at the top of the tower changed to "THEhotel" to distinguish the property. Formerly, the lettering was identical to the "Mandalay Bay" letters at the top of the original tower.

In 2011, the hotel became one of the few Las Vegas Strip hotel properties to allow dogs. Later that year, Travelocity included the hotel on its list of the top 10 hotels in Las Vegas, based on customer reviews.

=== Delano Las Vegas ===
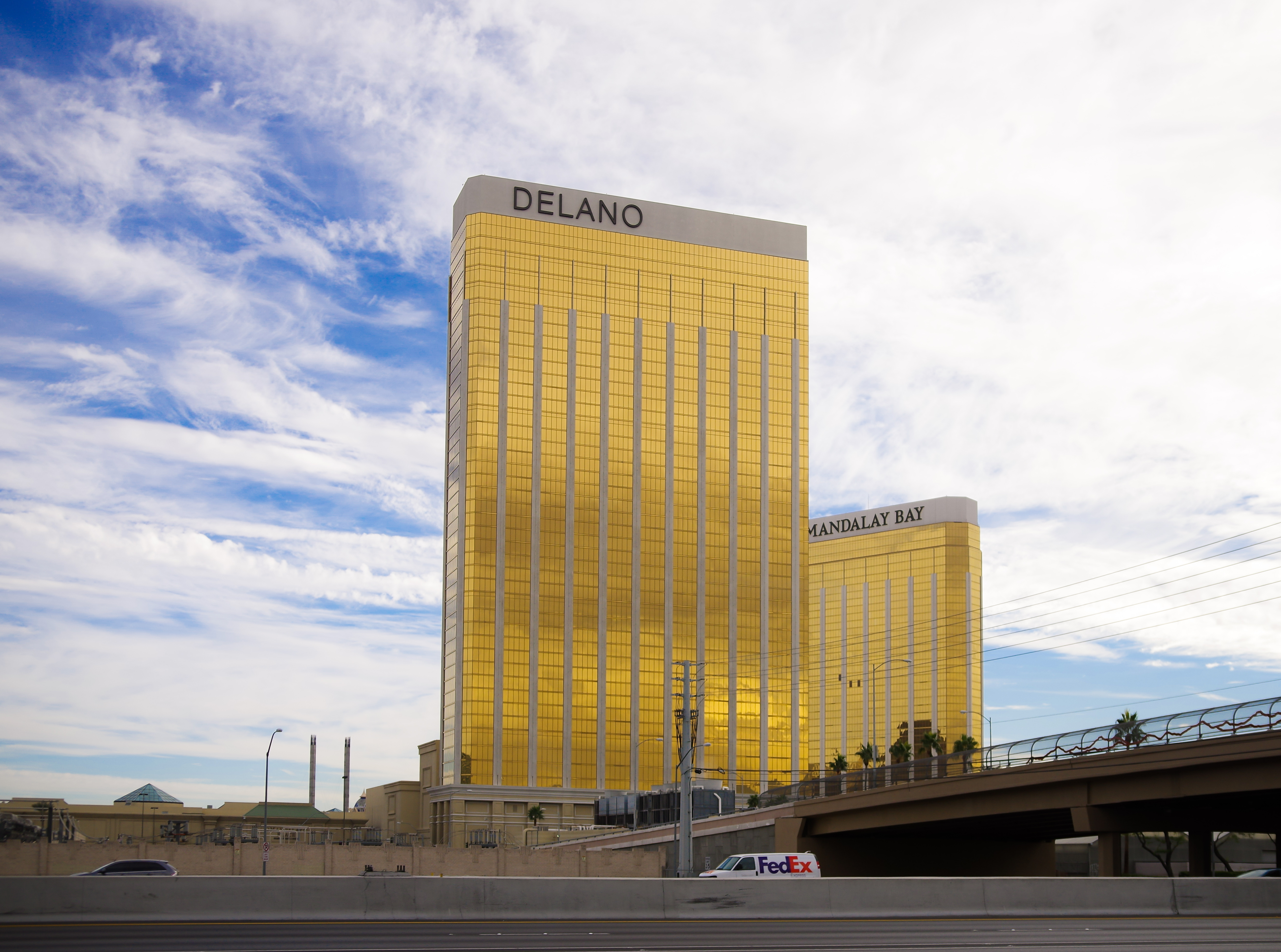
The hotel in 2014 when it was known as the Delano.

On August 6, 2012, MGM Resorts International announced the rebranding of THEhotel into Delano Las Vegas as part of a partnership with Morgans Hotel Group. Through the deal, MGM would manage the hotel under a licensing agreement with Morgans Hotel Group, which owned the Delano brand. All of the suites at the hotel were to be redesigned, along with new bars, lounges, restaurants and nightclubs.

Although THEhotel had been financially successful, the decision to renovate and rename it was part of a transformation at the Mandalay Bay. In addition, there had already been plans to renovate the nine-year-old hotel tower prior to forming a partnership with Morgans Hotel Group, which had been expanding the Delano brand. Morgans Hotel Group previously planned to open a Delano hotel at the cancelled Echelon project on the Las Vegas Strip. Mandalay Bay president and chief operating officer Chuck Bowling said that while people enjoyed THEhotel, it "in many cases, was a tower of Mandalay Bay. What we really want to do at Delano is create its own spirit, its own energy."

The renovations and name change were initially expected to be complete by late 2013, although the design phase took longer than expected. MGM announced in September 2013 that the renovation would be delayed several months. Design plans were soon finalized, and construction began in April 2014. To avoid major room closures, only a few floors were worked on each week leading up to the eventual completion of renovations, which also included revamping the lobby. Other changes included redesigned hallways and furnishings. The renovations cost $80 million, and largely took place inside the tower, which retained its gold appearance.

THEhotel signs were removed from the tower in June 2014, and were replaced two months later with new signs for the renamed hotel. Delano Las Vegas officially opened with a ribbon-cutting ceremony on September 2, 2014. A grand-opening party was held on September 18, 2014, with Samantha Ronson as DJ and a performance by Magic!. The party was also attended by Charlotte Ronson and actress Jaime King. The hotel's penthouses were the last remaining rooms to undergo renovations, with completion expected for October 2014.

The new property was inspired by the Delano South Beach in Miami, while also having a Mojave Desert theme in addition to an abundance of white coloring. Delano Las Vegas was also an homage to 32nd U.S. president Franklin Delano Roosevelt, and included the Franklin lounge as well as iceboxes resembling Roosevelt's hat box. On display in the hotel's entrance was a 126,000-pound metaquartzite boulder, divided in half. The boulder, approximately 150 million years old, was nine feet tall and five feet deep. The hotel's designers had discovered the boulder while trekking in the Mojave Desert in Jean, Nevada, and the process to transport it to the hotel included the use of a 240-ton hydraulic crane. Like its predecessor, Delano Las Vegas also did not offer gambling.

=== W Las Vegas ===
On December 18, 2024, MGM renamed the property as W Las Vegas, in partnership with Marriott International and its W Hotels brand. Earlier in 2023, both companies launched the MGM Collection with Marriott Bonvoy. Marriott previously operated a W Las Vegas from 2016 to 2018, at the Sahara resort, known then as the SLS. An earlier W Las Vegas proposal was canceled in 2007.

== Amenities ==
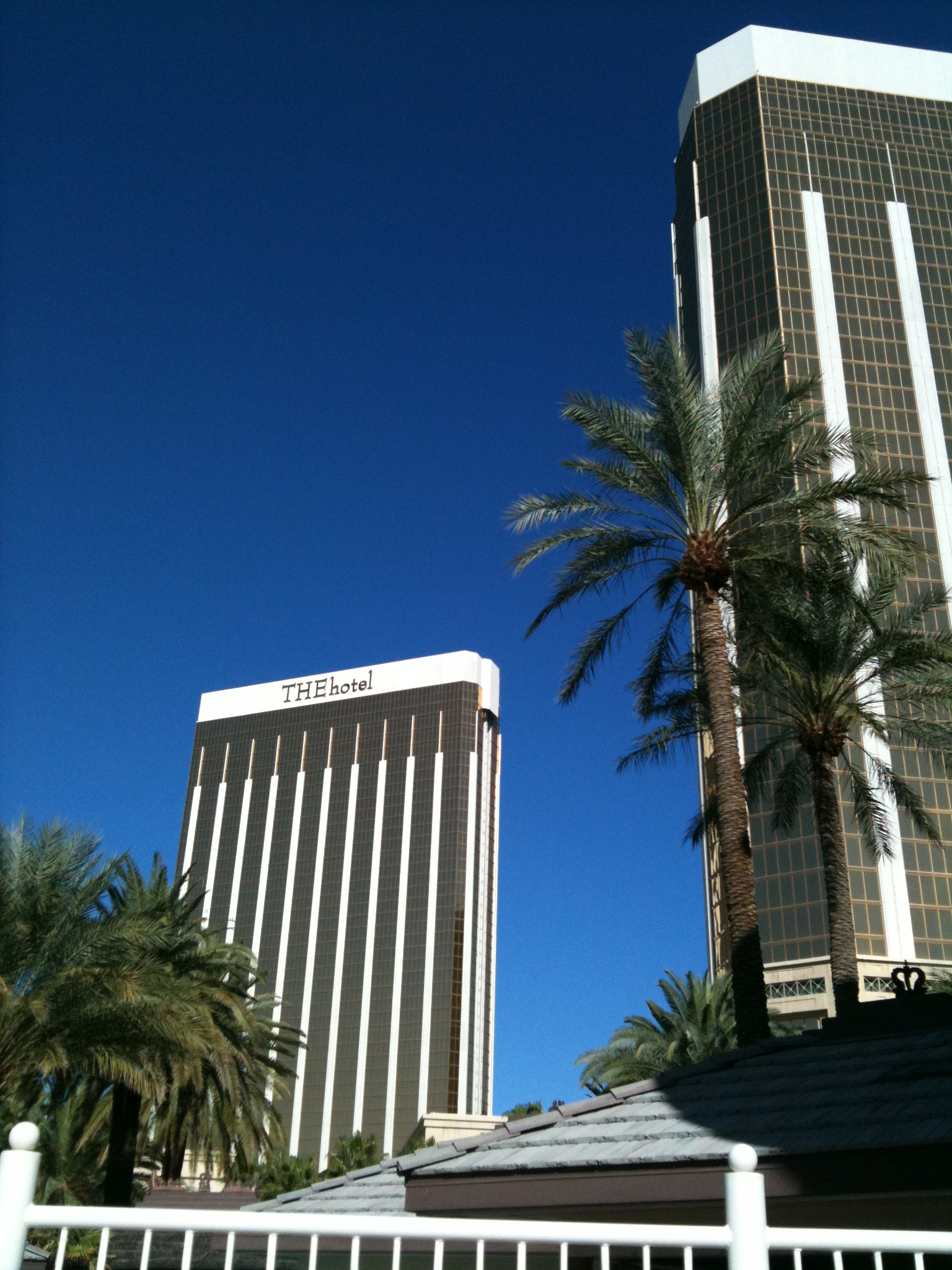
THEhotel in 2010

The tower is 43 stories, and featured 1,118 rooms upon opening, which brought the Mandalay Bay's total room count to 4,762. It offered the largest standard suites in Las Vegas, measuring 725 sq ft (67.4 m^{2}). The hotel's first floor included a bar, a 24-hour restaurant, and a 60,000 sq ft (5,600 m^{2}) lobby. Floors 3 through 6 contained 80 business suites as well as conference space. The tower's regular suites were located on floors 7 through 38, while floors 39 through 41 contained VIP suites from 1,500 sq ft (140 m^{2}) to 2,600 sq ft (240 m^{2}). The 24-hour restaurant, known as The Cafe, had seating for 150 people. A $25 million spa was expected to open in the first quarter of 2004.

Mix, a restaurant and lounge by Alain Ducasse, opened in December 2004 on the 43rd floor. The restaurant included seating for 240 people, and floor-to-ceiling windows that provided a view of the Las Vegas Strip, while the lounge included an outdoor patio area. The restaurant also included a $500,000 chandelier made of 13,000 glass bulbs. The spa, known as The Bathhouse, contained 15,000 sq ft (1,400 m^{2}). Men made up 40 percent of the spa's clientele.

The Delano opened with 1,117 rooms. At 725 square-feet, the rooms remained among the largest standard rooms of any hotel on the Strip. Rooms included 28 penthouses, and dog-friendly suites. A new restaurant, the 140-seat Delia's Kitchen, opened along with the Delano in September 2014. A greenhouse was built at the hotel to provide the restaurant with fresh herbs. Also opened in the lobby was a coffee bar, 3940 Coffee + Tea, named after the hotel's address.

In April 2015, the hotel opened its Delano Beach Club to guests. The club included 16 cabanas and offered poolside amenities such as free food and drinks, as well as DJs two days a week. The club was also open to non-guests who reserved a cabana. Mix was replaced by Ducasse's Rivea restaurant and Skyfall lounge in October 2015, marking the end of the Delano rebranding process. Rivea served Mediterranean food while Skyfall offered DJs and 180-degree views of Las Vegas. A room previously used by the Mix restaurant to store plates and other items was converted into Rivea+, a private dining room for VIP guests. Delano Las Vegas retained the Bathhouse Spa.

== See also ==
- List of integrated resorts
