= Gary Loveman =

American economist and businessman

- Born: April 12, 1960 (age 66); Boston, Massachusetts, US
- Education: Wesleyan University (BA); Massachusetts Institute of Technology (PhD)
- Occupations: Economist, businessman

Gary William Loveman (born April 12, 1960) is an American economist, businessman, and former professor. After nine years on the faculty of Harvard Business School, he left in 1998 to become COO of Harrah's Entertainment, which, following a number of acquisitions, became Caesars Entertainment. He was the CEO of Caesars Entertainment Corporation for 12 years until stepping down in June 2015, amidst a bankruptcy and restructuring. He remained chairman until late 2017. He was also president of Aetna’s Consumer Health and Services division from October 2015 until January 2018.

In 2019, he co-founded digital health engagement platform Well. Loveman is known for the development and application of analytics to influence customer behavior, and is a minority owner of the Boston Celtics.

== Early life and education ==
Loveman grew up in Indianapolis, Indiana as the youngest of three siblings. His father was a factory worker at Western Electric and his mother a homemaker. As a child, he was interested in math and active in sports. Loveman went on to attend Wesleyan University where he earned a bachelor's degree in economics in 1982. After graduating from Wesleyan, Loveman worked for the Federal Reserve Bank of Boston for two years as an economic researcher before pursuing a doctorate degree at Massachusetts Institute of Technology. In 1989, Loveman completed his PhD in economics.

== Career ==
=== Harvard Business School ===
After graduating from MIT at the age of 29, Loveman began teaching at Harvard Business School, where he was a professor for nine years, and continues as a senior lecturer While at Harvard, Loveman taught Service Management and developed an interest in the service industry and customer service. In 1991 he was hired as a consultant for the casino company Harrah's Entertainment. He also launched a side career as a speaker and consultant after a 1994 paper he co-authored, titled "Putting the Service-Profit Chain to Work", attracted the attention of companies including Disney, McDonald's, and American Airlines. The paper focused on the relationship between company profits and customer loyalty, and the importance of rewarding employees who interact with customers. His later Harvard Business Review magazine articles include "Diamonds in the Data Mine", and "Act Like a Scientist", with fellow HBS professor, Stefan Thomke, in 2022.

=== Harrah's COO ===
In 1997, Loveman sent a letter to Phil Satre, the then-chief executive officer of Harrah's Entertainment, in which he offered advice for growing the company. Loveman again began to consult for Harrah's, and in 1998 he was offered the position of chief operating officer. He initially took a two-year sabbatical from Harvard to take on the role, at the end of which Loveman decided to remain with the company.

As COO, Loveman was responsible for the establishment of the company's Total Rewards loyalty management system, which gathers data on casino customers. The program allowed the company to analyze the travel and spending habits of their customers. Through this, Harrah's determined that repeat slot players, not high rollers, were most profitable. Under Loveman's leadership Harrah's began to focus on building loyalty and bringing more of these gamblers to the casino. Loveman also established a rewards program for Harrah's employees of all levels, based on customer satisfaction. He was Harrah's Entertainment's chief operating officer until 2003.

=== Harrah's and Caesars CEO ===
In 2003, Loveman became chief executive officer of Harrah's, replacing Phil Satre. By 2005, Loveman had grown Harrah's into the largest casino operator in the world with the acquisition of Caesars Entertainment. In 2008, he led the company as it transitioned from a public to private company, after being acquired by private equity firms Apollo Global Management and TPG Capital for approximately $30 billion.

During the 2008 financial crisis and the Great Recession, the company experienced a decrease in revenue and increased debt associated with the 2008 buyout by Apollo and TPG. Loveman cut costs and renegotiated the company's maturing debt to avoid defaulting. His leadership of the company through the debt restructuring in 2009 was praised by the American Gaming Association president and CEO Frank J. Fahrenkopf Jr.

During his tenure at Caesars, he introduced an employee health program with on-site clinics.

In 2010, Loveman oversaw Harrah's transition to the name Caesars Entertainment Corporation and led an effort to take the company public again. The company successfully completed an initial public offering in 2012, selling approximately two percent of its shares.

A proponent of legalizing online gambling, he helped to launch Caesars' online gambling operation in Nevada in September 2013.

As CEO, Loveman expanded Harrah's from 15 casinos in 2003 to over 54 locations in 2013, through the acquisition of Caesars, Horseshoe Gaming Holding, Planet Hollywood, the Imperial Palace casino, and the World Series of Poker brand. Loveman announced in February 2015 that he was going to step down from his post as CEO. He remained chairman until 2017.

=== Aetna ===
He became an executive vice president of Aetna and president of its Consumer Health and Services organization, Healthagen, in October 2015. He also joined Aetna's executive committee. Hired to expand both the consulting arm and health services, he and the division were charged with leading Aetna's strategies concerning "population health and consumer engagement," in part using data analytics and marketing. With the unit, Loveman developed digital tools and expanded Aetna's "consumer health and services analytics capabilities." In September 2016 Aetna opened a "consumer business hub" in Wellesley, Massachusetts under Loveman's oversight. Aetna announced in December 2017 that it would become a stand-alone unit inside CVS Health in 2018. Loveman stepped down from Aetna in January 2018.

=== Well Dot Inc. ===
In January 2019, he co-founded Well Dot, Inc., a personal health management platform the company developed an artificial intelligence (AI) app tool designed to increase individual health engagement, which it markets to employers, community health organizations, and directly to consumers. Well raised its initial seed funding in November 2019, including from General Catalyst and Blue Cross and Blue Shield of North Carolina. Headquartered in North Carolina and Massachusetts, Loveman is CEO.

== Committees and boards ==
Loveman is a member of the board of directors of the Boston Celtics, of which he acquired a minority stake in 2007. He also was on the board of directors at FedEx, Coach, Inc. and of the American Gaming Association, of which he was chairman, from 2007 to 2009.

He was chairman of the Business Roundtable's Health and Retirement Committee. In 2012, he was named to the President's Export Council. He was previously a member of MIT's Department of Economics' visiting committee. Loveman and his wife have also helped with fundraising efforts for Joslin Diabetes Center. Loveman is also on the board of trustees of Boston Children's Hospital. In 2017, Boston Children's Hospital announced that $350,000 had been donated in honor of Loveman by his former colleagues to fund malaria research and a music therapy program. In 2019, he joined the boards of The Aspen Group and diagnostic device startup Healthy.io.

== Awards and recognition ==
Loveman's career was the subject of a Stanford Graduate School of Business case study in 2003, and he was recognized as the "best CEO" in the gaming and lodging industry by Institutional Investor magazine in 2004, 2005, 2006 and 2007. In 2013, Loveman was inducted into the American Gaming Association's Gaming Hall of Fame and awarded the Education Hero Award by the Las Vegas-based Public Education Foundation.
