= Horseshoe Casino Baltimore =

Gaming complex in Maryland, U.S.

Coordinates: 39°16′51″N 76°37′24″W

- Exterior view (October 2026)

- Horseshoe Baltimore in Baltimore and Maryland Horseshoe Casino Baltimore (Maryland) Horseshoe Casino Baltimore (the United States)
- Interactive map of Horseshoe Casino Baltimore
- Location: Baltimore, Maryland, United States; 1525 Russell Street
- Opened: August 26, 2014; 12 years ago
- Gaming space: 122,000 sq ft (11,300 m^{2})
- Casino type: Land-based
- Owner: CBAC Gaming
- Operating license holder: Caesars Entertainment
- Website: caesars.com/baltimore

Horseshoe Baltimore is an urban two-story casino, and the second largest casino in Maryland with a 122,000-square-foot gaming floor. The $442-million facility features video lottery terminals, table games, and a World Series of Poker room. Horseshoe's 20,000-square-foot Baltimore Marketplace features Charm City food outlets, three premier restaurants, and several bars and lounges.

Horseshoe is located along Russell Street on Baltimore's south side, neighboring Camden Yards Sports Complex's M&T Bank Stadium, home of the NFL Baltimore Ravens, and Oriole Park, home of the MLB Baltimore Orioles, as well as Baltimore's Inner Harbor.

The casino is owned by CBAC Gaming, a group led by Caesars Entertainment, and is managed by Caesars. Other members of the CBAC consortium include Jack Entertainment; CVPR Gaming Holdings, LLC; STRON-MD Limited Partnership; and PRT TWO, LLC.

== History ==
In a 2008 constitutional referendum, Maryland voters approved a video lottery terminal casino facility in Baltimore City, and at four other locations throughout the state. In July 2012, the Maryland Lottery Commission approved a Caesars Entertainment-led consortium bid to develop and operate a gaming facility in downtown Baltimore.

Initial designs of the casino were prepared by Baltimore-based architects Ayers Saint Gross. Following the construction approval, revised renderings were prepared by Cleveland-based KA architects, who designed the Horseshoe Casino Cleveland.

On August 26, 2014, the casino opened with a full night of celebration that included a performances inside and outside of the Casino. Outside entertainment included a live performance from Andy Kushner Entertainment's Rhythm6 band and vertical dance performances by BANDALOOP and pyrotechnics before doors opened to VIPs. Inside entertainment was provided by legendary Motown artist Gladys Knight, with "break music" provided by Iggy Azalea and Pauly D.

In October 2018, the Horseshoe announced a multi-year marketing deal making it the official casino partner for the Baltimore Ravens.

== Question Seven ==
In November 2012, after the most expensive political campaign in Maryland's history, voters approved a 6th casino license in the state, as well as the addition of table games at all Maryland casino sites. Voters approved the expansion of gambling, Question 7, with 52 percent of the vote. More than $90 million was spent between the two campaigns in their efforts to sway voters. Vote Yes on Question 7 was led by MGM Resorts International, The Peterson Cos. and labor organizations. Vote No On 7 was funded almost entirely by Penn National Gaming, owner of Hollywood Casino at Charles Town Races.

== Reception ==
Baltimore Brew has been critical of the city's financial support of the casino, including increased police presence near the casino and planned financial reimbursements, particularly after initial revenue from the casino has proven to be less than anticipated.

Horseshoe also faces a unique security challenge, because it holds a 24-7 liquor license at its 14forty bar. The only bars in Maryland that can serve alcohol around the clock are in casinos.

== Walk @ Warner Street ==
Exterior view of Topgolf (October 2026)

Interior view of Topgolf (October 2026)

Walk at Warner Street (stylized as Walk @ Warner Street) is an upcoming entertainment district designed to connect the Horseshoe Casino to the Camden Yards Sports Complex, and Baltimore's Inner Harbor.

It includes Topgolf, which is a few walks away from the casino, and a concert hall known as The Paramount Baltimore, which was announced in early 2016. Construction started on July 2, 2020. However, construction halted around August 2023 because the main contractor, Clark Construction, abruptly filed a lawsuit against the developers, CBAC Gaming LLC, (Note: A legal affiliate of Caesars Entertainment, Rock Gaming, and Caves Valley Partners (CVP)) and the Paramount Founders Group, which ran out of funding to continue construction.

The developers secured $26 million in C-PACE financing, and the lawsuit was resolved in June 2025. Construction on the concert hall resumed in August 2025, now under the name The Ostend Baltimore. As of October 2026, the venue reverted its name to the Paramount Baltimore, and is in its final construction stages. It is scheduled to host its first performances by December 2026, and move into the spring of 2027.

== See also ==
- List of casinos in Maryland
