= Horseshoe Casino Tunica =

American gambling resort in Mississippi

Coordinates: 34.846910°N 90.330783°W

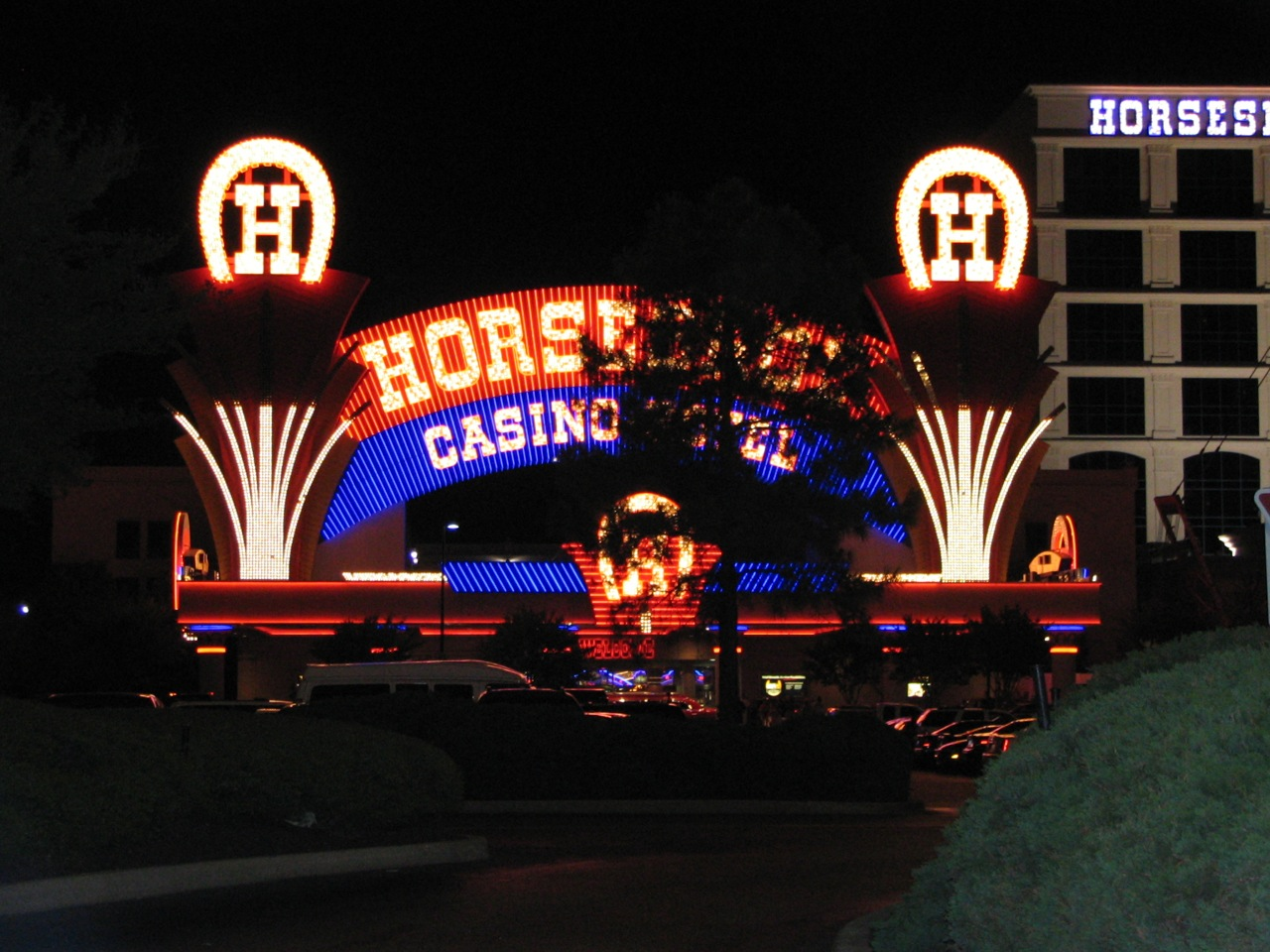
- Horseshoe Casino Tunica at night, 2006
- Interactive map of Horseshoe Casino Tunica
- Location: Tunica Resorts, Mississippi; 1021 Casino Center Drive
- Opened: 1995
- Theme: Western
- No. of rooms: 500+
- Permanent shows: Bluesville Showcase Nightclub
- Signature attractions: Bluesville Museum
- Notable restaurants: Jack Binion's Steak House
- Casino type: Riverboat casino
- Owner: Vici Properties
- Operating license holder: Caesars Entertainment
- Renovated in: 2005
- Website: caesars.com/horseshoe-tunica

Horseshoe Casino Tunica is a casino resort located in Tunica Resorts, Mississippi, United States. It was developed by Jack Binion, the son of Las Vegas gaming legend Benny Binion, and named after his father's famous Binion's Horseshoe downtown gambling hall. Much like its namesake, the Horseshoe Tunica is known for catering to serious gamblers, particularly table games players, and is known for its liberal, player-favorable rules and its comp policies.

The Tunica "Shoe" was opened in 1995 as part of "Casino Center," a development by Jack Binion with three casinos side by side [Circus Circus Tunica (now Gold Strike Tunica) and Sheraton Casino and Hotel (later Tunica Roadhouse Casino & Hotel, now razed) being the neighbors]. The property has undergone several expansions and renovations over the years.

Binion sold Horseshoe Gaming Holding Corporation, the Tunica property's corporate parent, to Harrah's Entertainment in 2004. Under Harrah's, the Tunica "Shoe" became home to a World Series of Poker circuit event; previously, the Horseshoe had partnered with the neighboring Gold Strike to host the Jack Binion World Poker Open, a stop on the World Poker Tour. Harrah's Entertainment renamed itself to Caesars Entertainment in 2010.

In October 2017, ownership of the property was transferred to Vici Properties as part of a corporate spin-off, and it was leased back to Caesars Entertainment.

The casino features more than 70 table games, more than 2,000 slot machines, a large poker room, three fine-dining restaurants, a large buffet and a snack bar. The hotel features more than 500 rooms, most configured as suites. The main showroom, the "Bluesville Showcase Nightclub" opened in 1998.

== See also ==
- List of Caesars Entertainment properties
- List of casinos in Mississippi
