= Horseshoe Hammond =

Casino in Indiana

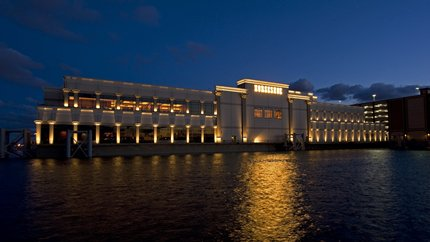
- Horseshoe Casino
- Interactive map of Horseshoe Casino Hammond
- Location: Hammond, Indiana; 777 Casino Center Drive; 41.69295°N 87.507718°W
- Opened: 1996
- Gaming space: 350,000 sq ft (33,000 m^{2})
- Signature attractions: Hammond Marina; Whihala Beach
- Casino type: Riverboat
- Owner: Vici Properties
- Operating license holder: Caesars Entertainment
- Previous names: Empress Casino
- Website: caesars.com/horseshoe-hammond

Horseshoe Casino Hammond is a casino located in Hammond, Indiana. The 400,000-square-foot (37,000 m^{2}) property containing gaming, entertainment, restaurants, bars, and lounges.

== History ==
Horseshoe Casino originally opened as Empress Casino in 1996 as a 54,000-square-foot (5,000 m^{2}), four-level gaming vessel. Horseshoe Gaming Holding Corporation was established in 1993 as a private holding company, mostly owned by Jack Binion. In 1999, the corporation acquired Empress Casinos, including both the Hammond property and another Empress Casino in Joliet, Illinois. After selling off the Joliet property in 2001, the Hammond property was rebranded as Horseshoe Casino Hammond on May 4, 2001. In 2004, the corporation was sold to Harrah's Entertainment (rebranded as Caesars Entertainment in 2010), which began the construction of a new gaming vessel, designed by Friedmutter Group, in 2006. The current casino facility opened on August 8, 2008.

In October 2017, ownership of the property was transferred to Vici Properties as part of a corporate spin-off, and it was leased back to Caesars Entertainment.

== Facilities ==
The vessel has two public floors, including the main gaming floor with a special high limit, poker, and Asian gaming areas, two feature bars, and a VIP lounge, as well as a second floor with a 3,400-capacity entertainment space and an updated Village Square Buffet. The vessel is adjacent to the main pavilion, with multiple food outlets, including Jack Binion's Steakhouse, as well as a gift shop and ballroom/meeting facilities.

"The Venue" is Horseshoe Casino's entertainment and event space. The 90,000-square-foot (8,400 m^{2}) space was designed by Montreal-based theater design firm Sceno Plus, best known for designing other noteworthy entertainment venues such as the Resorts World Theatre in Las Vegas, the Colosseum at Caesars Palace, as well as several Cirque du Soleil theaters in the United States. Though the standard setup is 2,500 theater-style telescopic seats, the seats can be pulled back to create a full general-admission room that can be set up for more contemporary rock shows, as well as function as a banquet and tradeshow facility. The Venue opened with the casino on August 8, 2008, with a midnight Asian show featuring Andy Hui and William So, and held several more grand opening concerts that same weekend, including Bette Midler, Alicia Keys, Smashing Pumpkins, Mo'Nique, and James Blunt. More than 200 acts performed in The Venue in its first three years and additional events have included The Great Midwest Smokeout and the Chicago Circuit Championship of the World Series of Poker.

The casino employs over 2,200 people.

== Gambling ==
Horseshoe Casino has over 350,000 square feet (33,000 m^{2}) of gaming space and currently has over 3,000 slot machines (including over 250 video poker machines) and 100 gaming tables. The high-limit gaming room features 125 machines in denominations up to $1,000 and is centered around an acrylic horseshoe statue, the second-largest acrylic statue in the United States behind Tiffany's at the time of its opening in 2008.

Horseshoe is home to the most significant poker room in the Midwest, featuring 34 tables at all limits and a private poker area, Benny's Back Room — named for the founder of the original Horseshoe in downtown Las Vegas, Benny Binion.

Horseshoe has consistently branded itself as the home of the highest limits. Benny Binion, upon opening the original Binion's Horseshoe in Las Vegas, was the first to institute high table limits. The craps table limit of $500 was 10 times higher than any other casino in Las Vegas, and eventually, Binion raised the limit to $10,000 and even eliminated table limits at times.

Horseshoe regularly hosts poker tournaments, including the World Series of Poker (WSOP) Chicago Circuit Event and Chicago Poker Classic. The WSOP Circuit Event is the largest in the United States.

== See also ==
- List of Caesars Entertainment properties
- List of casinos in Indiana
