= Argosy Empress Casino =

Riverboat casino in Illinois, United States

Coordinates: 41°28′42.0″N 88°8′38.5″W

Argosy's Empress Casino
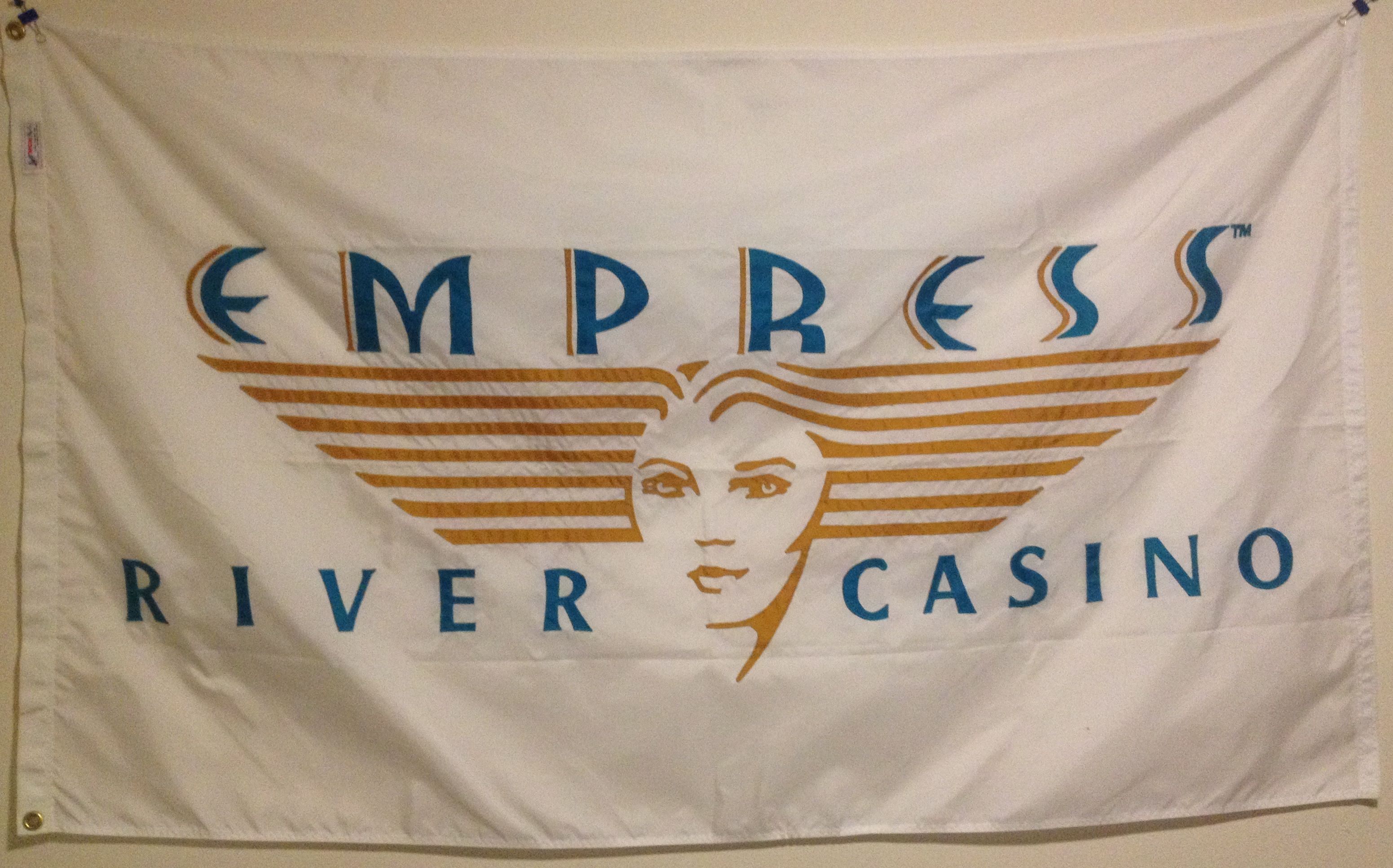
- The flag pictured is currently the only one known to have survived the fire that destroyed the Empress Casino. It displays the casinos official logo and now belongs to a private collector.
- Interactive map of Argosy's Empress Casino
- Location: Joliet, Illinois; 2300 Empress Drive Joliet, Illinois 60346
- Opened: June 16, 1992
- Closed: March 20, 2009
- Theme: Egyptian
- Casino type: Riverboat
- Owner: Empress Casinos (1992-1999); Horseshoe Gaming Holding Corporation (1999-2001); Argosy Gaming Company (2001-2004); Penn National Gaming (2004-2009; its destruction)
- Architect: LindenGroup Architects

Argosy's Empress Casino (also known as Empress Casino Joliet) was a Riverboat casino and hotel located in Joliet, Illinois, US. Built in the 1990s by a group of investors headed by T.J. Lambrecht, Empress Casino became one of the first riverboat casinos in Illinois. It was destroyed by a fire on March 20, 2009.

== History ==
In the early 1990s, construction company owner T.J. Lambrecht believed that a riverboat casino in Joliet could thrive, a risky idea at the time. Using a portion of his own money, he and a group of investors created Empress Casino. The Empress Casino opened on June 16, 1992, as a riverboat type casino in Joliet, Illinois. The casino made extensive use of the Egyptian theme including several pyramids on top of the entertainment complex, a large recreation of the Sphinx and faux hieroglyphics along the sides of the building. The unique Egyptian theme became the casino's hallmark. In 1996 its sister casino was opened in Hammond, Indiana, as Empress Casino Hammond. Empress sold both casino properties to Horseshoe Gaming Holding Corporation in 1999. Horseshoe sold the Empress Casino Joliet to the Argosy Gaming Company in 2001 for $465 million. The company re-branded it as Argosy's Empress Casino. Penn National Gaming acquired the Argosy Gaming Company in 2005 and took over all of its operations including the Empress Casino. While undergoing a renovation in 2009 the casino was destroyed by a fire. Penn National Gaming rebuilt the casino under its Hollywood Casino brand as Hollywood Casino Joliet, the Egyptian theme was mostly removed and replaced with 1920's-1930's art deco.

== Attractions ==
- Club Chameleon- A bar and nightclub
- Club Chameleon Gift Shop- A small shop selling casino merchandise
- Marrakech Market Buffet- A large buffet
- Zanzibar- A bar and area available for private parties and banquets
- Cafe Casablanca- An Arab style coffeehouse

The interiors were designed by the Varond Design Group, Inc.

== Hotel and RV park ==
The Empress had a detached 102 room hotel. The hotel included a pool and whirlpool area along with a business/conference center. Empress was the only casino in northern Illinois to have an onsite RV park. The park was opened seasonally and provided many amenities including showers, and water/electrical hook ups. A complimentary shuttle bus ran between the hotel and the casino.

== Fire and rebuilding ==
While undergoing a $50 Million renovation, a fire broke out at around 10 a.m. on March 20, 2009. The fire was caused by a spark from a welder's torch which ignited grease in one of the kitchens. The subsequent fire spread rapidly. The casino was evacuated and fire crews attempted to contain the fire for several hours. The fire burned above the sprinkler systems reach in what are known as void spaces, inside walls and above hung ceilings. Inside the void spaces the fire spread quickly and decimated the entire entertainment complex. It took a significant portion of the cities fire department several hours to bring the blaze under control. The fire resulted in no fatalities however two guest were transported to a nearby hospital with non-life-threatening injuries. While the gaming complex itself was untouched by the fire the entire entertainment area was a total loss. The roof collapsed on the kitchen and ballroom area taking with it one of the large pyramid structures that sat atop the roof.

The fire and the casinos subsequent closing was potentially catastrophic for the local economy. The Empress employed over 800 people and was Joliet's second largest tax payer. The month before the fire the casino paid a reported $837,000 in taxes to the city along with $1.8 million to the state of Illinois. In a press conference after the fire the Empress Casino said it was losing $500,000 in revenue every day it remained closed. Nearby business also reported a dip in revenue. During the same press conference the general manager said "We will be paying our employees for up to 90 days with full pay and full benefits and for the tip folks, we're going to be paying them 50 percent of any of their reported tip income."

After being closed for 97 days the casino was able to reopen the gaming area which was renovated after the fire. The Empress Casino reopened on June 25, 2009, as the Hollywood Casino Joliet. The new casino, still owned by Penn National Gaming, abandoned the Egyptian theme for an art-deco Hollywood styling. In honor of the new casino "Empress Drive" was renamed "Hollywood Blvd." and the address changed to: 777 Hollywood Blvd. Joliet, IL 60436. The hotel and RV park still remain open but with diminished amenities. The hotel closed its pool and business/conference center. Unlike the casino the hotel did not undergo any significant renovations and still retains the Egyptian exterior styling. The roof of the shower area at the entrance to the RV park still retains its pyramid top.

== Lawsuits ==
In 2008 the Empress Casino was one of four plaintiffs in the Supreme Court of Illinois case Empress Casino v. Giannoulias. The suit challenged an imposed tax on the grounds that it was unconstitutional.

On October 23, 2012, lawyers representing the former Empress Casino filed a lawsuit against the six companies involved in the renovations at the time of the fire. The lawsuit claimed $83.5 million in damages resulting from 11 counts of negligence and willful and wanton conduct. The suit claims that the company did not provide a fire extinguisher near the welder as he worked and that the cleaning company employed failed to remove all the grease residue properly. The suit cites the architect, engineer, and supplier for failure to include sprinkler systems in the attic and truss spaces.
