= Ohio Casino Control Commission =

Commission overview
- Formed: 2011
- Jurisdiction: State of Ohio
- Headquarters: 100 East Broad Street, 20th Floor; Columbus, Ohio 43215
- Commission executives: Thomas J. Stickrath, Chair; Penelope Cunningham, Vice Chair; Andromeda Morrison, Interim Executive Director
- Website: casinocontrol.ohio.gov

Map

The Ohio Casino Control Commission has the responsibility to ensure the integrity of casino gaming, sports gaming, skill-based amusement machines and fantasy contests by licensing, regulating, investigating and enforcing state laws.

== History ==
The commission was created in 2011 with the passage of Ohio's Casino Control Law in 2011.

== Composition ==
The commission is bipartisan and composed of seven commissioners appointed by the governor of Ohio with the advice and consent of the Ohio Senate.

== Activities ==
The Commission is authorized to license, regulate, investigate, and exert jurisdiction over all people engaging in casino gaming in Ohio. The Commission adopts administrative rules and resolutions which establish the standards and procedures for casino operators, vendors, and licensed gaming industry employees.
