= Horseshoe Gaming Holding Corporation =

- Industry: Gaming
- Founded: 1993; 33 years ago
- Founder: Jack Binion
- Defunct: 2004
- Fate: Merged with Harrah's Entertainment
- Headquarters: United States
- Products: Casinos, hotels

Horseshoe Gaming Holding Corporation was established in 1993 with its only asset being the rights to use the Horseshoe name on casinos. The corporation was a private holding company mostly owned by Jack Binion.

== History ==
In 1994, the company acquired the Horseshoe Bossier City. The following year it opened a second casino Horseshoe Casino Tunica.

In 1999 the company grew more by acquiring Empress Casinos and its two casinos.

In 2001, the Empress Casino in Joliet was sold to Argosy Gaming Company and the Empress Casino in Hammond was rebranded to the Horseshoe Casino Hammond which opened under the new name on May 4, 2001.

In 2004 the corporation was sold to Harrah's Entertainment which retained the corporation as the operating company for its Horseshoe branded casinos.

== Casinos ==
- Horseshoe Bossier City
- Horseshoe Casino Tunica
- Horseshoe Hammond
- Empress Casino
