= Jack Cleveland Casino =

Casino in Cleveland, Ohio, US

Coordinates: 41.498658°N 81.693295°W

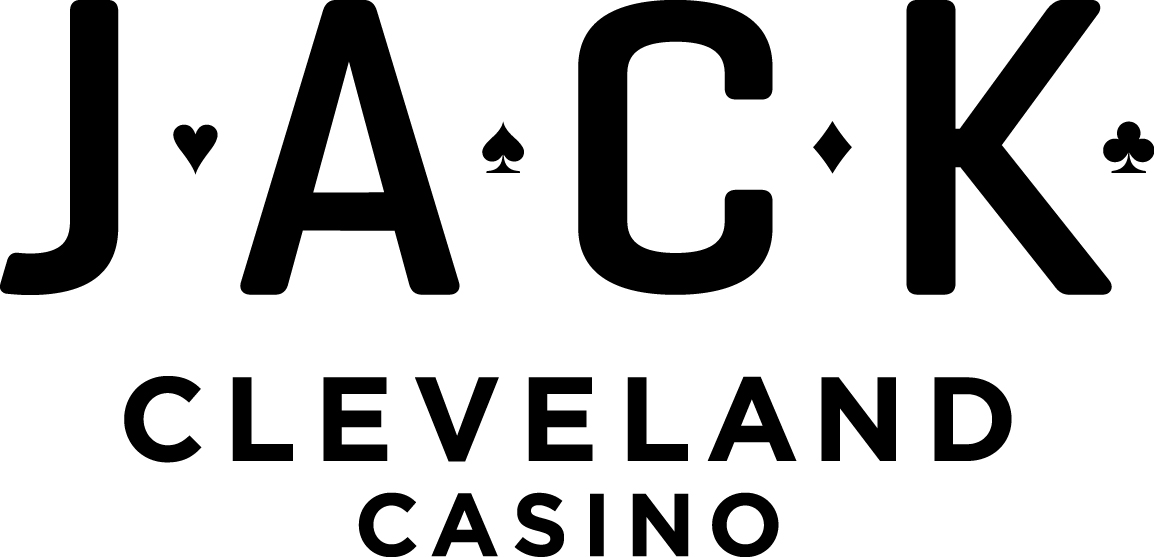

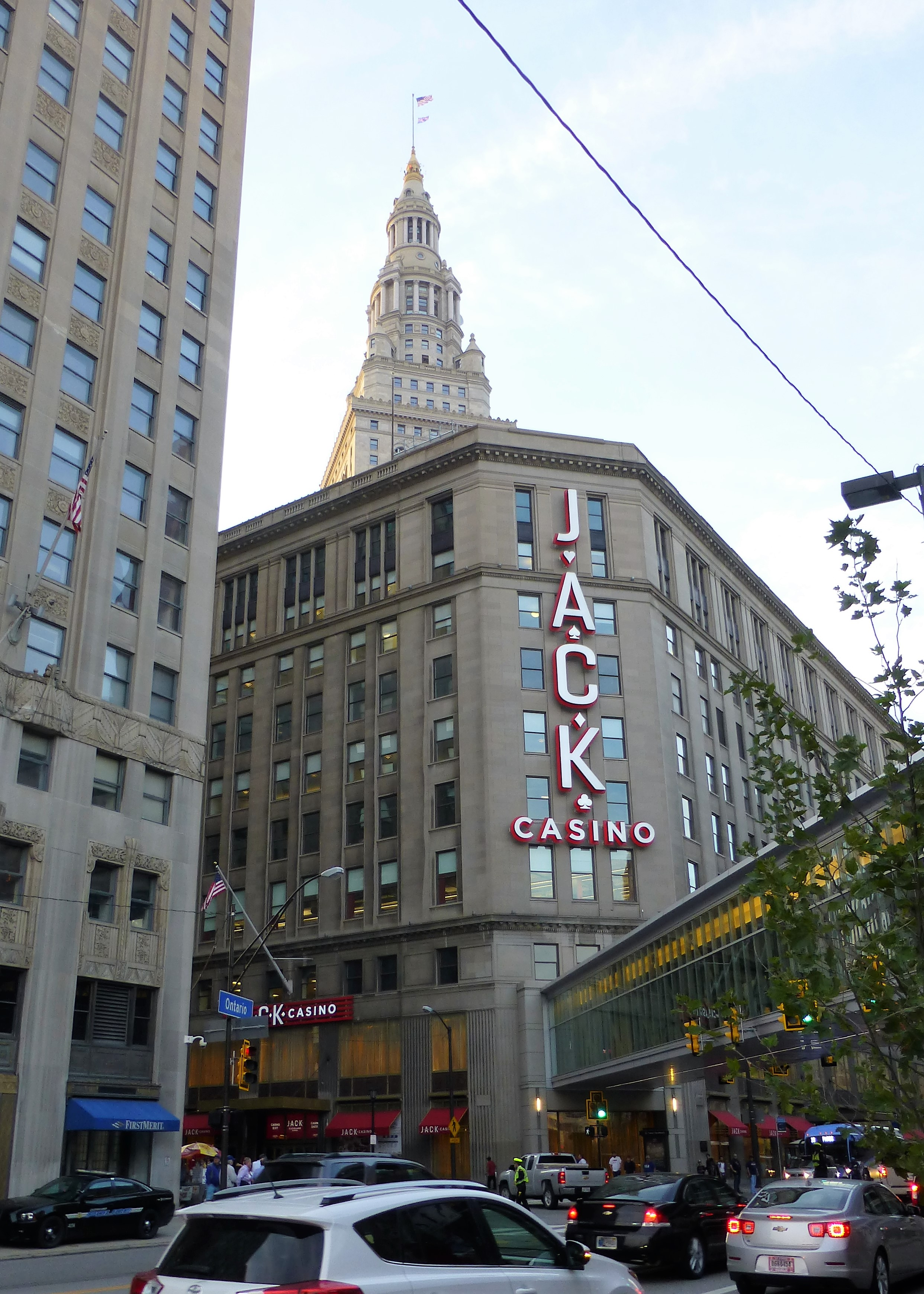
- Interactive map of Jack Cleveland Casino
- Location: 100 Public Square Cleveland, Ohio 44113
- Opened: May 14, 2012
- Gaming space: 100,000 sq ft (9,300 m^{2})
- Casino type: Land-based
- Owner: Vici Properties
- Operating license holder: Jack Entertainment
- Website: jackentertainment.com/cleveland

Jack Cleveland Casino (formerly Horseshoe Cleveland) is a casino in the downtown core of Cleveland, Ohio, United States, owned by Vici Properties and operated by Jack Entertainment.

== Casino ==
Jack Cleveland Casino is located in the former Higbee Building at Tower City Center in downtown Cleveland. It has 100,000 sq ft (9,300 m^{2}) of gaming space. The casino has 1,609 slot machines, 119 table games, 28 poker tables, and 35 electronic table games. The casino is accessible from Public Square, but is also accessible from the Terminal Tower and the Tower City Center shopping mall. The casino has teamed with the Renaissance, The Ritz-Carlton, and the Marriott at Key Center to offer rooms to its guests, and Rock Ohio Caesars purchased the Ritz-Carlton from Forest City Enterprises. The casino is open 24 hours a day and is completely smoke-free (The casino added a private smoking section inside of the physical building near public Square), compliant with Ohio law. Since the casino has limited dining options, it has partnered with nearly a dozen downtown Cleveland restaurants.

== History ==
Ohio voters approved (53%) a state constitutional amendment in November 2009 authorizing casinos in the state’s four largest cities: Cleveland, Cincinnati, Columbus and Toledo. It was the fifth statewide vote to legalize gambling in Ohio in over 20 years.

Horseshoe Cleveland opened on May 14, 2012, as the first casino in the state of Ohio. It was developed by Rock Ohio Caesars, a joint venture between Caesars Entertainment and Dan Gilbert's Rock Gaming, and managed is by Caesars.

Hollywood Casino Toledo, developed and operated by Penn National Gaming, opened on May 29, followed by Hollywood Columbus, which opened on October 8, 2012. Rock Ohio Caesars also developed Horseshoe Casino Cincinnati, which opened on March 4, 2013.

Gross casino revenues are taxed at 33 percent, one of the highest rates in the nation for a resort casino with this level of investment. Portions of the tax revenue are designated for public school districts; the four host cities; all 88 state counties; the Ohio State Racing Commission; law enforcement training; and research and treatment of problem gambling and substance abuse. The bipartisan Ohio Casino Control Commission was created in 2011 to develop rules for casino gaming in Ohio, to license operators and to regulate and ensure the integrity of operations. It is also funded by casino tax revenue.

Rock Gaming acquired Caesars Entertainment's 20% stake in Rock Ohio Caesars in February 2015, and later in the year announced that it would assume management of the properties, including Horseshoe Cleveland. Rock Gaming announced in February 2016 that the company and its casinos would rebrand under the Jack name. The casino closed for 40 hours in May 2016 to undergo its transition to the Jack name and management.

In 2020, Jack Entertainment sold the casino's real estate to Vici Properties and leased it back.

== See also ==
- List of casinos in Ohio
