= Fertitta =

Fertitta may refer to:

== People ==
- Frank Fertitta Jr. (1938–2009), American businessman
- Frank Fertitta III (born 1962), American businessman
- Lorenzo Fertitta (born 1968), American businessman
- Tilman J. Fertitta (born 1957), American businessman
