= Boulder Station =

Hotel and casino in Nevada, United States

Coordinates: 36.1334°N 115.0848°W

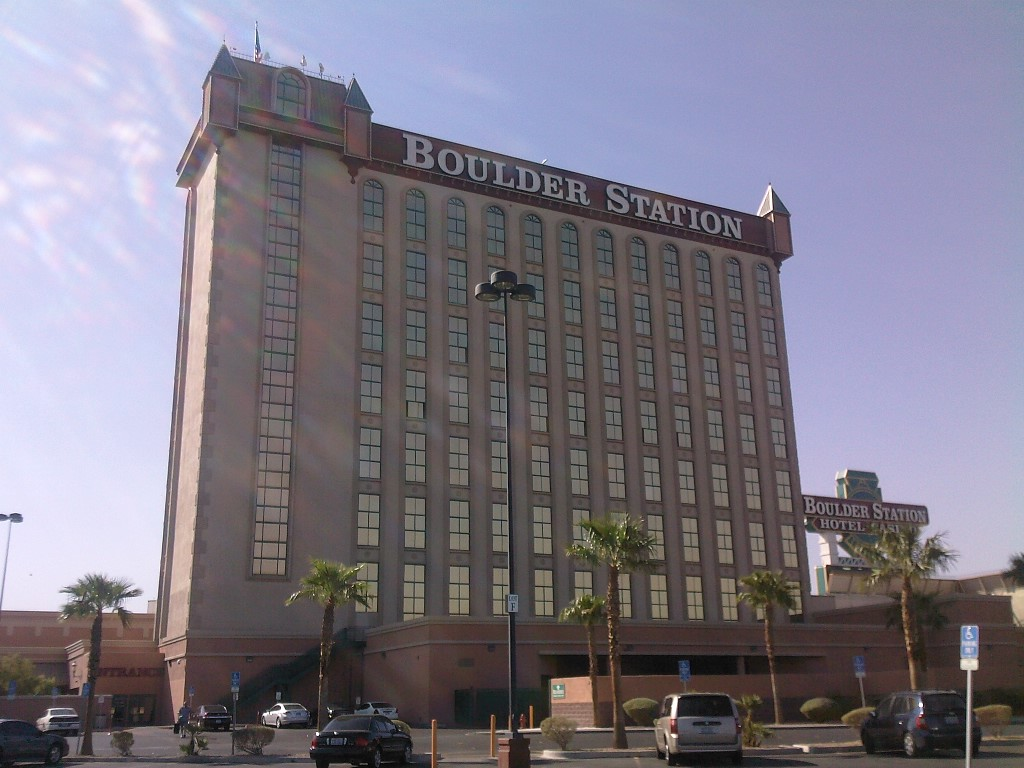
- Boulder Station hotel tower in 2009
- Interactive map of Boulder Station
- Location: Sunrise Manor, Nevada, U.S.; 4111 Boulder Highway
- Opened: August 23, 1994; 31 years ago
- Theme: Victorian/railroad
- No. of rooms: 300
- Gaming space: 89,443 sq ft (8,309.5 m^{2})
- Signature attractions: Regal Cinemas
- Notable restaurants: The Brass Fork (formerly Grand Café); Feast Buffet (1994–2020); The Broiler; Capriotti's; Sbarro; Wingstop
- Casino type: Land-based
- Owner: Station Casinos
- Architect: Marnell Corrao Associates
- Renovated in: 1995, 1996, 2000, 2008, 2011
- Website: boulderstation.com

Boulder Station is a hotel and casino located in Sunrise Manor, Nevada on Boulder Highway. It is owned and operated by Station Casinos. Groundbreaking began on August 5, 1993. The project was built at a cost of $103 million, and opened on August 23, 1994. An expansion in 1995 added a child-care facility, an 11-screen movie theater, and a video game arcade. A $50 million renovation took place in 2008, to compete against the new Eastside Cannery. A renovation of the hotel's 300 rooms was completed in 2011.

Boulder Station's Railhead concert venue has earned several awards from the Academy of Country Music for its hosting of country performers. The Railhead has also hosted various blues performers as well. Multiple incidents, including several shootings, have occurred on the property during its history.

== History ==
Boulder Station was built on 27 acres (11 ha) located at the northeast corner of Lamb Boulevard and Boulder Highway. The site was chosen by Station Casinos in 1986, as the company believed that the east side of the Las Vegas Valley was under served. The site was also chosen because of its easy access from the nearby Interstate 515.

Boulder Station was designed by Marrnell Corrao Associates, construction manager was Chanen Construction Company Inc. of Phoenix. Groundbreaking of the $85 million Boulder Station began on August 5, 1993. Attendees at the groundbreaking ceremony included Las Vegas mayor Jan Laverty Jones and Nevada governor Robert Miller. The project was expected to employ 1,700 people, with approximately 260 employees from the Palace Station expressing an interest in being transferred to the new property. The 15-story hotel tower was expected to be topped off in March 1994, and the project's ultimate cost was $103 million. Boulder Station was the first project that Station Casinos CEO Frank Fertitta III oversaw from its conception to its completion.

Boulder Station's roadside neon sign had been activated by early August 1994, ahead of the property's opening. It was the largest freestanding sign along Boulder Highway. The sign included the world's largest color screen, measuring 8,000 sq ft (740 m^{2}) and being visible for more than two miles away, including downtown Las Vegas. The screen was manufactured in Canada by Adtronics Signs Ltd. The total weight of the sign was 1,500 tons, and the creation of the sign's footings required 58 trucks to pour concrete constantly over a seven-hour period.

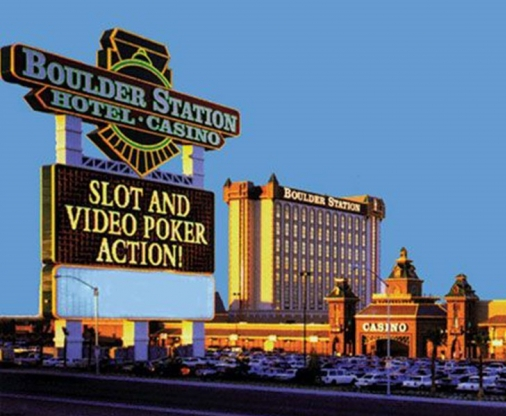
The Boulder Station roadside sign with its 8,000-sq-ft color display—visible more than two miles away, manufactured in Canada by Adtronics Signs Ltd.

Boulder Station opened on August 23, 1994, with a fireworks show. It was the first new hotel-casino to open on the east side of Las Vegas since 1979. Boulder Station included 300 hotel rooms and a 75,000 sq ft (7,000 m^{2}) casino with 2,200 slot and video poker machines, 44 table games, and a 10-table poker room. The casino also included a 70-seat keno lounge and a 240-seat race and sportsbook. The 44 table games were located in a casino pit accompanied by stained glass murals depicting 19th century trains. The railroad-theme was shared by its sister property, the Palace Station. Boulder Station's design consisted of Victorian architecture, and the resort totaled 252,000 sq ft (23,400 m^{2}). The casino included the 270-seat Railhead Saloon, featuring live music. Also included were five restaurants and eight fast-food eateries. Among the five restaurants was a 522-seat buffet. In January 1995, Travel Holiday named the casino's The Broiler restaurant among the best restaurant values in the United States. It is popular for its steak and seafood.

=== Operation and renovations ===
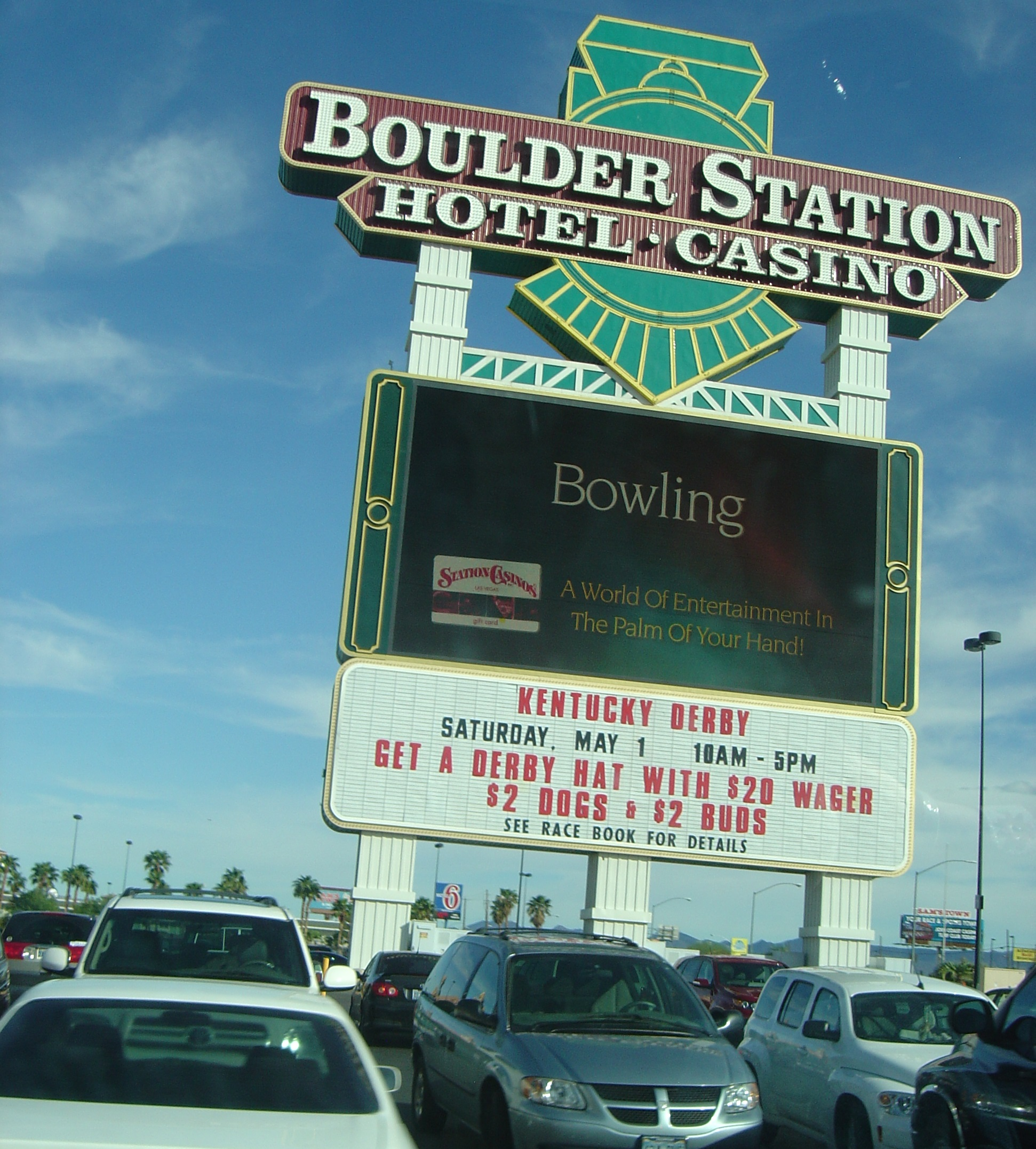
Boulder Station sign in 2010

Boulder Station was built with room for potential expansions. In December 1995, Boulder Station added several new amenities, including an 11-screen movie theater operated by Act III Theatres, and later by Regal Cinemas. Also added was an 8,000 sq ft (740 m^{2}) child-care facility, and a 3,200 sq ft (300 m^{2}) video game arcade. In response to customer requests, Boulder Station opened an 8,000 sq ft (740 m^{2}), 600-seat bingo parlor in June 1996. In the late 1990s, Boulder Station launched its Very Important Seniors (VI$) program, offering special discounts to the large number of nearby elderly residents. The program subsequently expanded to other Station casinos. In 1999, Boulder Station and Sunset Station became the first hotel-casino properties in the Las Vegas Valley to offer pedicab service, transporting customers to and from their cars in the parking lot.

By April 1999, there were plans to add a 19-story hotel tower to the property, adding an additional 507 rooms. Tentative plans for a bowling alley and an expanded food court were approved in December 1999, as an early step towards eventual expansion plans. An expansion of the Railhead took place in 2000. In 2001, Station Casinos put out a request for proposals on expanding Boulder Station to include a bowling alley, an expansion and renovation of the casino, and the construction of a tunnel that would connect to the valet parking area. However, the company stated that such an expansion was not imminent, and that the cost, size and start date were still to be determined.

A $50 million renovation began on Boulder Station ahead of the August 2008 opening of its new, nearby competitor, Eastside Cannery. The project included the renovation of the slot floor, the poker room, the sports book, the hotel rooms, and the opening of a new bingo room. Boulder Station's buffet was also remodeled. During this time, the Railhead was closed as a concert venue so it could operate as a temporary buffet while the original one underwent remodeling, which concluded in November 2008. During the remodel, upcoming concert acts from the Railhead were moved to other Station properties. A new table game, Two Cards High, was field-tested at Boulder Station during a 90-day trial period in 2009. A renovation of the hotel's 300 rooms was completed in October 2011, following renovations of the poker room, the Broiler Steakhouse, and the Feast Buffet. As of 2012, Boulder Station included Pasta Cucina, an Italian restaurant that received a "B+" in a review from the Las Vegas Review-Journal.

As of Boulder Station's 20th anniversary, the property had retained 115 of its original employees from its opening day. A rally protesting Station Casinos' labor practices was held at Boulder Station in August 2014, and was organized by the Culinary Workers Union. As of September 2016, Boulder Station had 1,200 employees; 576 of them were eligible to vote in a Culinary Workers Union ballot that sought representation from the union. That month, in a vote organized by the Culinary Workers Union and conducted by the National Labor Relations Board, employees voted in favor of unionizing Boulder Station by 355 to 177. Boulder Station would become the second Station Casinos property to be unionized, after the Station-managed Graton Resort & Casino in California ratified the company's first union contract in 2014. In August 2020, a majority of the union employees signed a petition asking that they no longer be represented by the Culinary union. The union filed an unfair labor practice charge against Station Casinos, alleging that the company had unlawfully withdrawn representation.

Boulder Station is the second oldest Station Casinos property, after Palace Station. The casino contains 89,443 sq ft (8,309.5 m^{2}). The buffet closed in 2020, due to the COVID-19 pandemic in Nevada. Two years later, the space was reopened as a food court with several eateries, including Capriotti's, Sbarro, and Wingstop.

=== Incidents ===
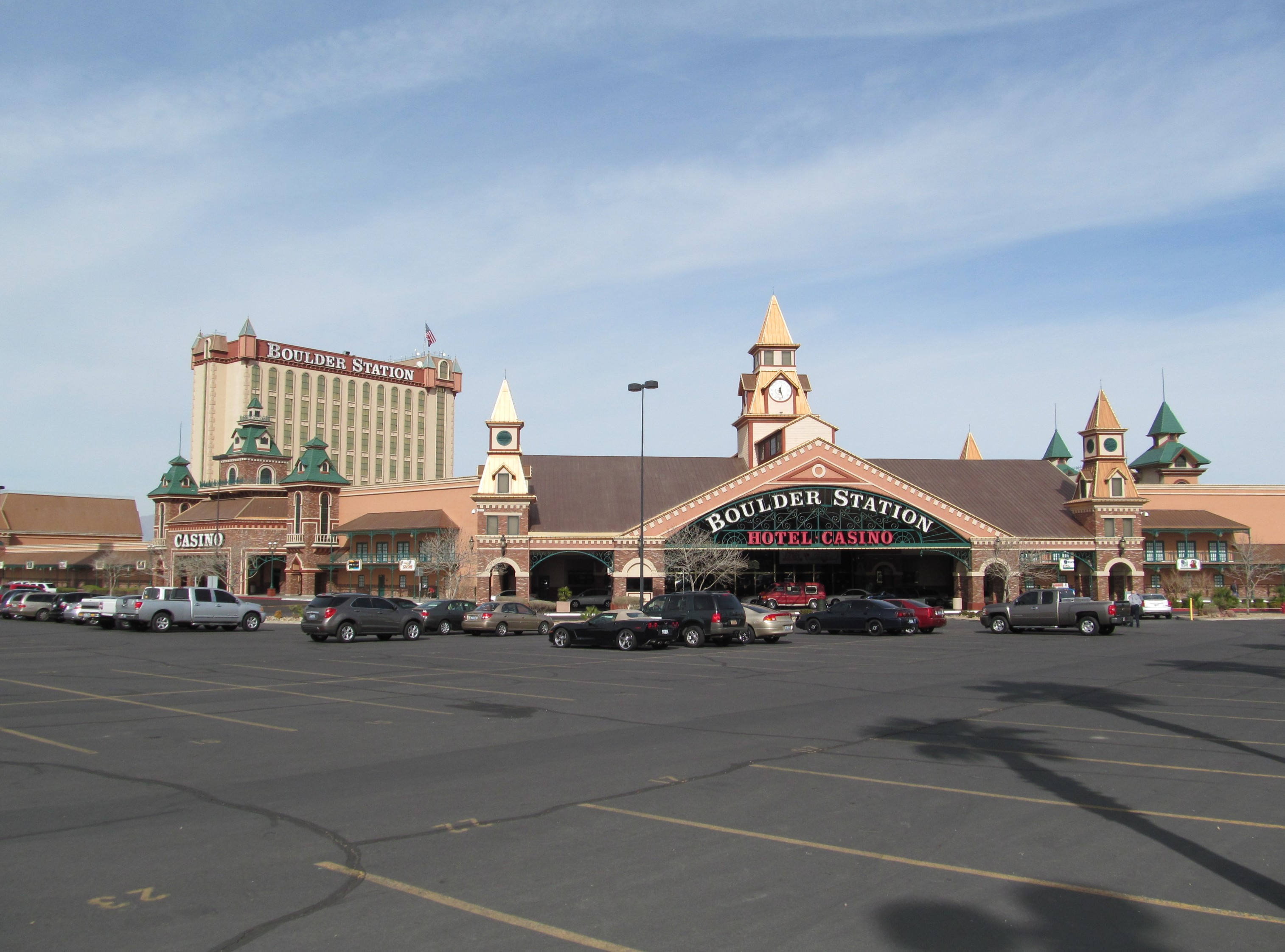
A portion of the parking lot, seen in 2012

In November 2000, a man crashed a vehicle into Boulder Station, which subsequently sued the driver and the car's owner for $21,790 in damages. In 2002, a 30-year-old armed man robbed a change booth inside Boulder Station and later opened fire while fleeing through the casino, injuring a slot employee. The robber was killed by a security guard. In 2003, a 20-year-old man was shot and killed on the top-floor of Boulder Station's parking garage, after previously fighting with another man. In 2004, two men were shot in the parking lot, resulting in one death. On December 31, 2008, a 53-year-old man made a bomb threat against Boulder Station as part of a robbery attempt to pay his medical bills, prompting the evacuation of the casino area. The man was later arrested, and it was discovered that he had no bomb.

In August 2016, a hotel employee was battered and sexually assaulted by a 22-year-old man in one of the rooms on the 10th floor. During the same month, a security officer for the property was patrolling the parking garage when he was beaten by three teenagers who took his gun. A shooting occurred in the parking lot in May 2017, when a man shot at another man in self-defense during an attempted robbery. In October 2017, a woman was robbed of her purse in the parking lot. In July 2018, two people exchanged shots at each other during an altercation in the parking lot. The incident ended when a security officer, who had been shot twice, fired at one of the suspects.

== Live entertainment ==
In 1996, the Railhead began its Boulder Blues Series, a free blues concert series offered each week. Notable blues performers at the Railhead have included Sista Monica Parker, Roy Rogers, Norton Buffalo, Eric Sardinas, and John Lee Hooker Jr.

The Railhead won awards from the Academy of Country Music for its hosting of country performers, including an award as the best casino venue in the United States for country musicians. Country performers at the Railhead have included Trace Adkins, Little Big Town, Toby Keith, Merle Haggard, Kenny Chesney, Phil Vassar, Zac Brown Band, Miranda Lambert, and the Dixie Chicks. Other country performers have included Mel Tillis, Leon Russell, Tanya Tucker, Vince Gill, Dwight Yoakam, Brad Paisley, Diamond Rio, and Don Williams.

Other performers have included Jerry Vale, Belinda Carlisle, Diane Schuur, Vince Neil, Gaylord and Holiday, Chris Duarte, Keiko Matsui, Brian Wilson, Wayman Tisdale, Robin Trower, Blue Öyster Cult, The Alan Parsons Project, Delbert McClinton, and Los Lobos. Peggy DeCastro had her final performance at Boulder Station in February 2004, a month prior to her death.
