= Aliante =

Aliante is used to refer to several items including:

- Aliante, North Las Vegas, an upscale master-planned community in North Las Vegas, Nevada
  - Aliante Casino and Hotel
- 9426 Aliante
