= Frank Fertitta =

Frank Fertitta may refer to:

- Frank Fertitta Jr. (1938–2009), American entrepreneur
- Frank Fertitta III (born 1962), American entrepreneur
