= Texas Station =

Casino hotel in Las Vegas, Nevada, United States

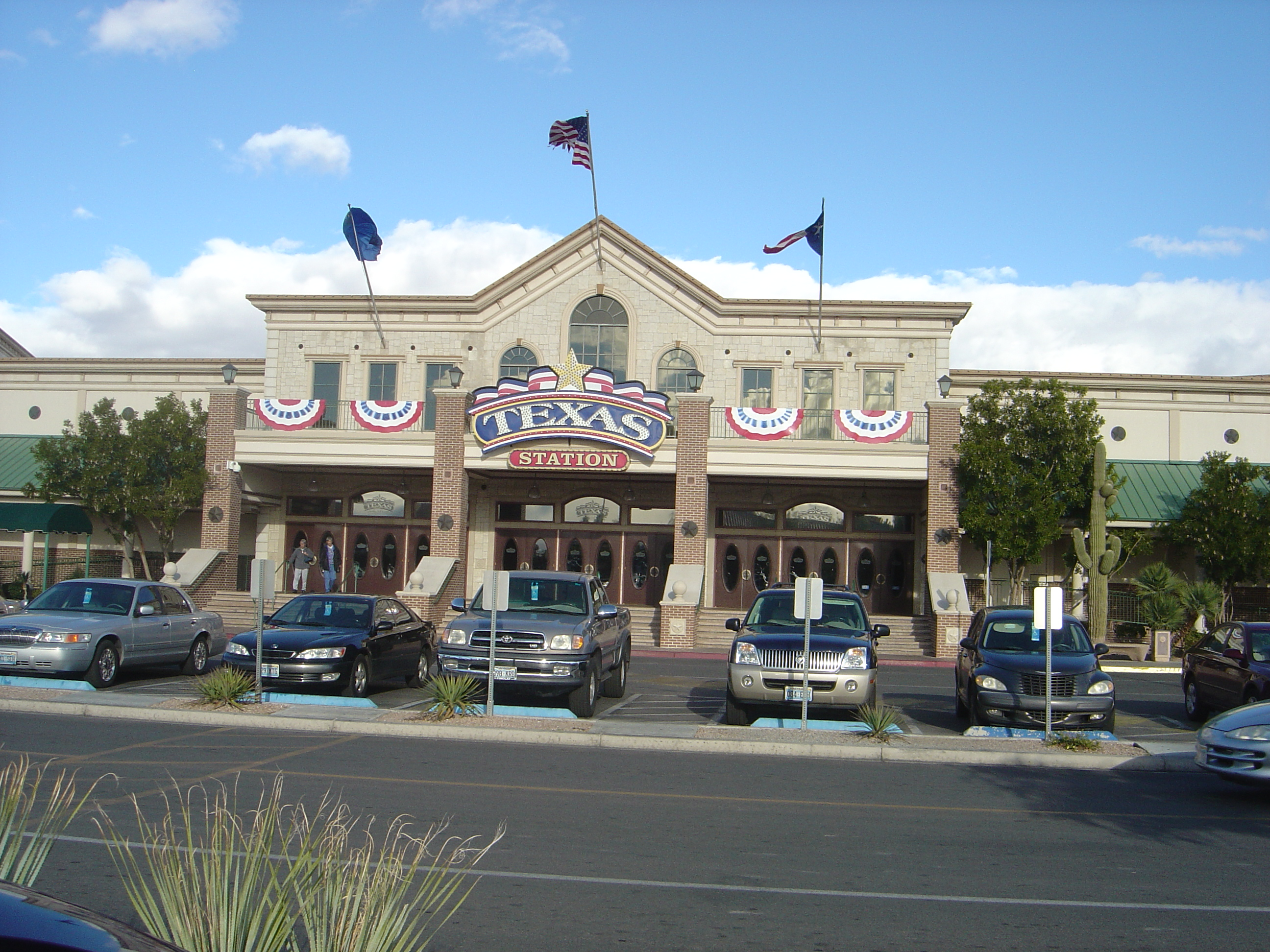
- Texas Station in 2010
- Interactive map of Texas Station
- Location: North Las Vegas, Nevada, U.S.; 2101 Texas Star Lane; 36°11′52″N 115°11′27″W
- Opened: July 12, 1995; 30 years ago
- Closed: March 17, 2020; 6 years ago
- Theme: State of Texas
- No. of rooms: 200
- Gaming space: 121,823 sq ft (11,317.7 m^{2}) (as of 2017)
- Signature attractions: Regal Cinemas; Bowling alley
- Notable restaurants: Austins Steakhouse; Feast Buffet; Grand Café
- Casino type: Land-based
- Owner: Station Casinos
- Architect: Marnell Corrao Associates
- Renovated in: 1995–1996, 1998–1999, 2000, 2018

Texas Station was a casino hotel in North Las Vegas, Nevada. It was owned and operated by Station Casinos. Texas native Frank Fertitta Jr., the hotel-casino's original owner, chose the Texas theme to appeal to customers from his home state. Fertitta sold the hotel-casino for $95 million to Station Casinos, his former company, prior to its opening on July 12, 1995. It was the largest hotel-casino in North Las Vegas at the time of its opening, with a 60,000 sq ft (5,600 m^{2}) casino and a six-story, 200-room hotel.

Texas Station was expanded several times, including a $55 million expansion that began in 1998. The expansion added a food court, a child-care facility, and a parking garage, as well as additional movie theater screens and casino space. A $65 million expansion took place during 2000, and included the addition of a convention hall, a bowling alley, new restaurants, and two wedding chapels.

Nevada casinos were closed on March 17, 2020, due to the COVID-19 pandemic. Prior to the pandemic, Texas Station had been one of the company's worst-performing properties. Although casinos began reopening later in 2020, Texas Station remained closed, with most of its customer base relocating to the company's nearby Santa Fe Station. In July 2022, Station Casinos announced that it would demolish Texas Station and sell the land.

== History ==
The resort, known originally as Texas Gambling Hall & Hotel, was located on 47 acres (19 ha). It was designed and built by Marnell Corrao Associates at a cost of $62.8 million. Chanen Construction Company Inc. of Phoenix provided construction management to Corrao. The hotel included 200 rooms in a six-story building. The resort was located at 2101 Texas Star Lane, near the intersection of North Rancho Drive and West Lake Mead Boulevard. Station Casinos' founder and former owner, Frank Fertitta Jr., owned the hotel-casino during construction. He sold it to his former company for $95 million in June 1995, prior to the resort's opening. Shareholders in Station Casinos had objected to Fertitta branching out into the gaming industry on his own, prompting the company's purchase. Fertitta kept ownership of the land, which he purchased in June 1994. Fertitta had wanted the resort to appeal to customers from his home state of Texas, and he included various subtle references to Texas-Mexican history in the project's design. The resort's exterior was designed to resemble an 1890s government architectural style common in Texas, while the interior was designed to replicate the San Antonio River Walk.

The Texas opened on July 12, 1995, with a fireworks show and the presence of the Dallas Cowboys Cheerleaders. It was the largest hotel-casino to open in North Las Vegas. The 60,000 sq ft (5,600 m^{2}) casino included 1,600 slot machines, 35 table games, a race and sportsbook, and six bars. The resort also had six restaurants, including Laredo Cantina and Café, Stockyard Steak & Seafood House, Galveston Bay Seafood Co., and the 24-hour Yellow Rose Café. The resort also had the Italian restaurant San Lorenzo, and the Rio Grande Buffet, which included barbecue cuisine. It later became the Feast Buffet. The resort also included a movie theater, operated by Act III Theatres.

In November 1995, the resort began a 7,800 sq ft (720 m^{2}) expansion, which concluded three months later. A parking garage was also completed in 1996. The Texas had initially been a poor financial performer for Station Casinos because of limited customers and casino play. However, revenues later increased following an extensive marketing campaign and the addition of the 600-space parking garage. In April 1996, the resort was renamed Texas Station, capitalizing on the company's brand name.

In 1996, Texas Station adopted C.P. Squires Elementary, one of Clark County's oldest elementary schools, as its community partner. Texas Station set up many fundraising events for at-risk students including a "wishing well sweep" that takes all the coins from its fountains. The initial sweep netted $1,000 in coins and Texas Station committed to donating all future proceeds to the school to help fund a computer lab. Future boxer Floyd Mayweather Jr. fought his first fight at the Texas Station on October 11, 1996. A nightclub, Texas Late Nite, opened that month, between the casino's bingo hall and poker room. In January 1997, the Las Vegas Advisor ranked the Texas Station's buffet among the top buffets in Las Vegas.

=== 1998 expansion ===
A potential $40 million expansion was under consideration in December 1997, and was contingent on Station Casinos' success in transforming its corporate structure into a real estate investment trust. At the time, the casino consisted of 73,000 sq ft (6,800 m^{2}). In May 1998, plans were announced for a $51 million expansion that would include the addition of 21,000 sq ft (2,000 m^{2}) in casino space, for a new total of 94,000 sq ft (8,700 m^{2}). Other additions would include six movie screens to the 12-screen movie theater; a 10,000 sq ft (930 m^{2}) Kids Quest child-care facility; a food court and expanded video game arcade; a bar and lounge; and a 2,000-space parking garage. The expansion was planned to help the resort better compete against the Fiesta hotel-casino across the street, as well as the nearby Santa Fe hotel-casino. Station would later purchase both of these properties.

The expansion project began in July 1998, and it ultimately cost $55 million. The Texas Station remained open during the expansion, which nearly doubled the resort's size with the addition of nearly 120,000 sq ft (11,000 m^{2}), for a new total of 270,000 sq ft (25,000 m^{2}). Tri Star Team Builders was contracted for $38 million to handle the new construction work. As a joint venture, Tri Star Team Builders and PCL Construction worked together on the expansion. The movie theater, then operated by Regal Cinemas, closed temporarily in January 1999 because of the expansion. Construction operated on a continuous 24-hour schedule in the days leading up to the expansion's planned opening.

The new areas opened on February 9, 1999, along with the reopening of the movie theater, while the six new movie screens were scheduled to open later in the month. The expansion added 58,000 sq ft (5,400 m^{2}) of casino space and 850 new slot, video poker and keno machines. The 4,400 sq ft (410 m^{2}) race and sportsbook was also redesigned. Also added was the Martini Ranch, a 24-hour southwestern-themed cocktail lounge located in the center of the casino, with seating for 70 people. The expansion also featured an 8,200 sq ft (760 m^{2}) food court with seven eateries that included Krispy Kreme. Also built was the Kids Quest child-care facility. A 126,000 sq ft (11,700 m^{2}) parking garage with 2,900 spaces was built on the property's north side, at the southeast corner of West Lake Mead Boulevard and North Rancho Drive. The garage was added to deal with common customer complaints about inadequate parking, and the garage's location was chosen because of its proximity to a busy intersection.

In 1999, resort officials planned to plant a time capsule on the property, at a cost of more than $10,000. The capsule included items from North Las Vegas mayor Mike Montandon, Las Vegas mayor Jan Jones, and Nevada governor Kenny Guinn. The capsule was expected to be planted in January 2000, to mark the new millennium, with the intention to have it unburied in the year 3000.

=== 2000 expansion ===
In November 1999, the North Las Vegas Planning Commission approved plans for another expansion that would add 200,000 sq ft (19,000 m^{2}) to the resort, including an additional 11,000 sq ft (1,000 m^{2}) of casino space. At the time, the casino had 2,800 slot machines and 40 table games. Other additions included a 70,000 sq ft (6,500 m^{2}) 60-lane bowling alley, as well as meeting and ballroom space, and a 600-space employee parking garage. In January 2000, Station Casinos announced that the expansion would cost $55 million, with construction expected to begin by March and conclude in early 2001. The expansion was expected to include 350 additional slot machines. The expansion plans had been undergoing refinements for a year up to the time of the announcement.

In March 2000, plans were announced for the addition of two wedding chapels to the resort, making the Texas Station the first Las Vegas locals hotel to include a chapel. Up to that time, the resort had received between 40 and 60 wedding requests each day from interested people. Each chapel would be 1,000 sq ft (93 m^{2}), and they were to be built beside each other, with the option to combine the two for large weddings containing up to 220 guests. Between 80 and 120 weddings were expected to take place each month. The chapels were announced as part of the resort's ongoing expansion.

On April 27, 2000, The Venetian and Texas Station were the first casinos to announce child-care centers specifically aimed at employees of Las Vegas casinos. The Texas Station's child-care center was expected to open in June 2000. The resort's makeshift outdoor concert stage, known as South Padre, was removed to make room for the expansion. The South Padre had the capacity for 3,000 people, but it impacted the comfort of some hotel guests because of its proximity to the hotel building. Added to the resort was the Dallas Events Center, a convention hall which also included seating for up to 1,800 people for concerts and boxing matches.

The resort's expansion project ultimately cost $65 million, and was completed in late 2000. The expansion included two new restaurants. Austins Steakhouse opened at the resort in November 2000, replacing the Stockyard restaurant. Austins included a modern Italian design, and each element of the restaurant was inspired by artists including Henri Matisse and Frank Lloyd Wright. The Las Vegas Review-Journal gave Austins an "A" rating. Adjacent to Austins was the 26-seat A Bar lounge, and the resort also featured the Texas Star Oyster Bar.

The resort's bowling alley, popular among locals, was opened in December 2000. It accounted for $15 million to $18 million of the $65 million expansion. The resort also introduced its Club Rev concept, in which the bowling alley was turned into a bowling disco two nights a week, with a disc jockey, a light show, and go-go dancers. The wedding chapel also opened in December 2000, and the Texas Station invited more than 250 married couples to renew their vows there to celebrate the opening.

=== Shootings ===
In 1996, two men shot at security guards in the casino parking lot; there were no injuries. In 1998, near the valet parking lot, a man was injured when another man opened fire on him and three other people. In December 1999, a man was robbed and shot in the parking garage, and he subsequently sued the resort and Station Casinos for alleged inadequate security. In 2001, a murder suspect was shot at by a SWAT officer while fleeing the parking garage. Another shooting, believed to be gang-related, occurred at the Texas Station in January 2005, and it led to an increased police presence at the resort for the following weekend, as well as additional security guards and ushers at the resort's movie theater. In 2010, a woman suffered a non-life-threatening gunshot wound during an attempted armed robbery in the resort's northwest parking lot.

=== Later years ===
In 2004, the Texas Station's sign on North Rancho Drive was replaced with an energy efficient version of equal size. As of 2015, the Texas Station donated the coins from its wishing well to financially troubled schools in the Clark County School District. As of 2017, the casino was 121,823 sq ft (11,317.7 m^{2}). That year, Station Casinos purchased the Texas Station land as a long-term cost-saving measure. In March 2018, a renovation of the Regal Cinemas movie theater began, with completion scheduled for early May. The renovation would add larger seating, and a new bar and concession area on the second floor of the theater. The renovation was expected to cost at least $1.7 million.

North Las Vegas mayor John Lee held State of the City addresses at Texas Station several times during its final years. Nevada casinos were among businesses required to close on March 17, 2020, due to the COVID-19 pandemic and its effects on the state. Although Nevada casinos were allowed to reopen on June 4, 2020, Station Casinos planned to keep Texas Station closed for a year due to economic uncertainty brought on by the pandemic. Texas Station and the Fiesta were among Station's worst-performing properties prior to the pandemic, and their respective customer bases largely relocated to the company's Santa Fe property after casinos reopened. The company announced in August 2020 that the reopening of its closed properties, including Texas Station, was dependent on demand, noting that the closures may be permanent. Texas Station and Fiesta Rancho had a combined total of nearly 3,200 slot machines, and North Las Vegas saw decreased gaming revenue following their closure, while most of the state's other gaming markets experienced record profits during 2021.

During its closure, Texas Station had been used several times as a drive-through COVID-19 testing site. It was one of the main testing sites in the county, and also served as a food distribution site for residents affected by the pandemic.

Station announced on July 15, 2022, that it would demolish its closed properties, including the Texas Station and Fiesta. It would subsequently sell the land to finance future projects. Demolition began on September 12, 2022, and was completed by February 2023. The demolition was viewed by analysts as a defensive move to prevent future competition from gaming rivals. Mayor Lee was hopeful that the land would be redeveloped as commercial space. Pat Spearman, a mayoral candidate for North Las Vegas, had suggested retrofitting Texas Station as a support facility for female veterans. City officials later considered purchasing the Texas Station and Fiesta Rancho properties for redevelopment as affordable housing. However, the purchase price was deemed too high.

In July 2023, plans were announced by Agora Realty & Management to redevelop the two properties as a mixed-use community, known as Hylo Park. The project would include retail space and up to 665 houses on the former Texas Station land. Construction, to be done in phases, is expected to begin in early 2024 and conclude by late 2025.

== Gallery ==
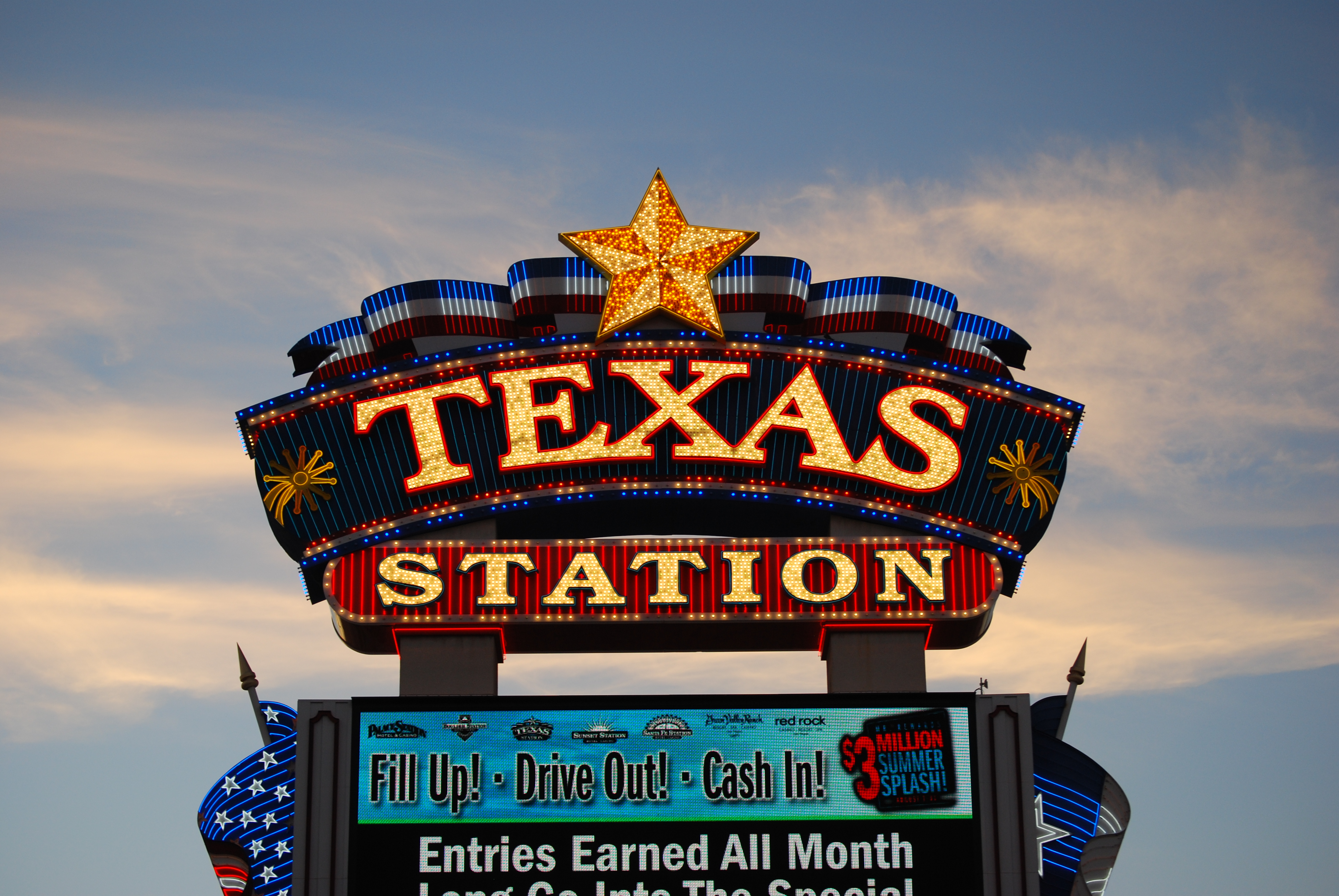
Texas Station in 2008

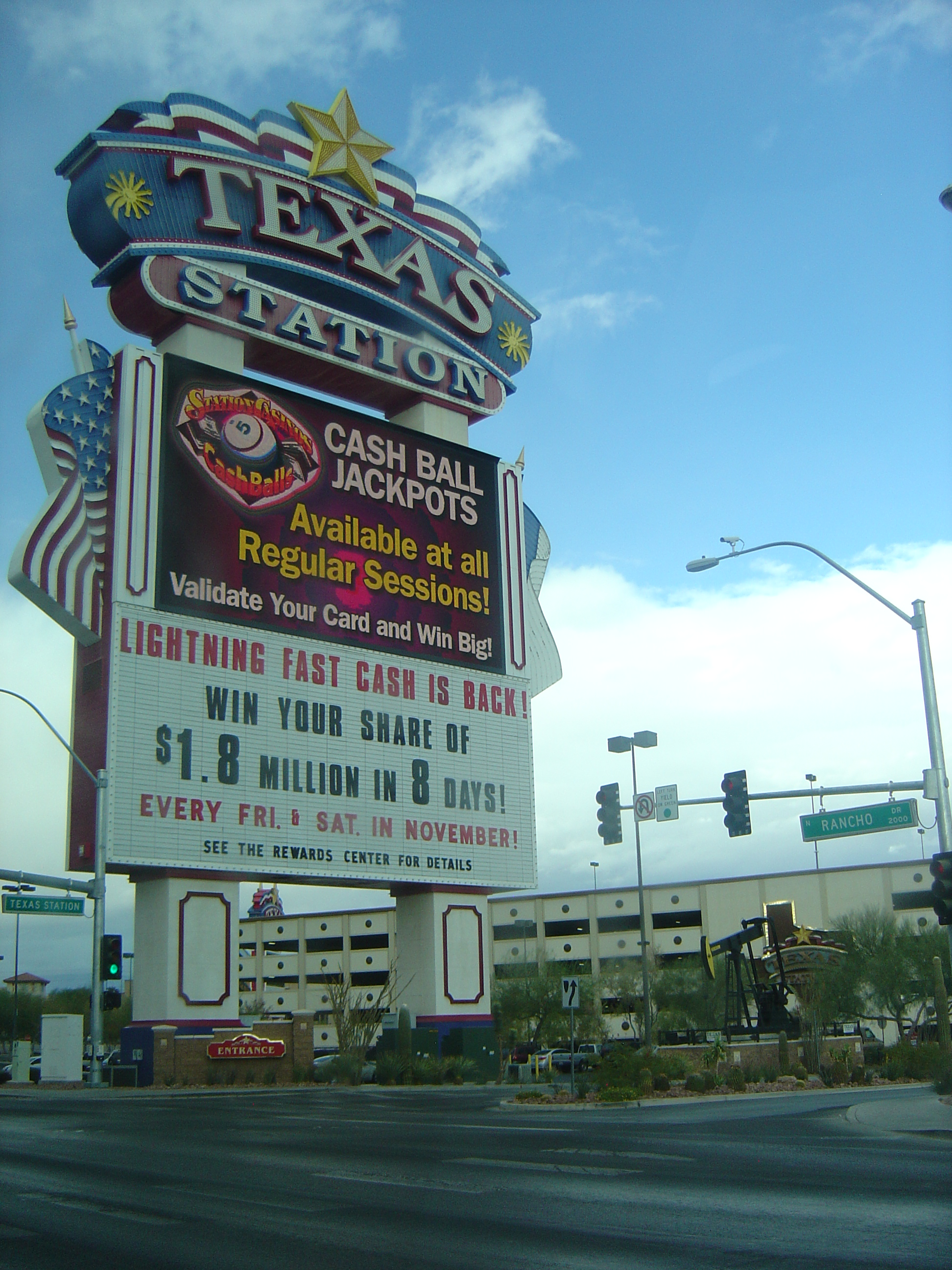
Texas Station sign on North Rancho Drive (2010)
