= Mount Rose Station =

- Interactive map of Mount Rose Station
- Location: Reno, Nevada, U.S.; 39.399659°N 119.750834°W
- Theme: Desert Modern
- No. of rooms: 500
- Gaming space: 165,000 sq ft (15,300 m^{2})

Mount Rose Station is a cancelled hotel and casino that was located at the intersection of Herz Boulevard and Mount Rose Highway next to The Summit in Reno, Nevada. The land was owned by Station Casinos and was located on 88 acres (36 ha) of land.

The building design was similar to Aliante (formerly known as Aliante Station), Green Valley Ranch and Red Rock Resort.
