= Zuffa =

American sports promotion company

Zuffa, LLC
- Trade name: Zuffa
- Type: Subsidiary
- Industry: Sports promotion
- Founded: January 2001; 25 years ago
- Founders: Frank Fertitta III; Lorenzo Fertitta
- Headquarters: Las Vegas, Nevada, United States
- Key people: Ari Emanuel (CEO – TKO); Dana White (CEO and president – UFC)
- Owner: TKO Operating Company (f.k.a. Zuffa Parent, LLC)
- Parent: TKO Group Holdings
- Subsidiaries: Ultimate Fighting Championship (2001); World Fighting Alliance (2006); Pride Fighting Championships (2007); World Extreme Cagefighting (2010); Strikeforce (2013)

Zuffa (/ˈzuːfə/ ZOO-fə) is an American sports promotion company specializing in mixed martial arts and founded in 2001; the company is now a subsidiary of TKO Group Holdings (TKO) and is the legal owner of certain Ultimate Fighting Championship (UFC) properties following the merger of the UFC and WWE. Despite this, the Zuffa logo and brand have been retired from on-air usage in favor of emphasizing the UFC brand. The name has been revived for a legally separate TKO-owned professional boxing promotion known as "Zuffa Boxing."

== Overview ==
Zuffa, LLC was founded in January 2001 in Las Vegas, Nevada, by Station Casinos executives Frank Fertitta III and Lorenzo Fertitta to be the parent entity of the Ultimate Fighting Championship (UFC) after they purchased it from the Semaphore Entertainment Group.

Zuffa was acquired in 2016 by a group led by WME-IMG (later Endeavor) including Silver Lake Partners, KKR, and MSD Capital for the price of $4.025 billion. After the Endeavor deal closed, the Zuffa logo and brand were retired from on-air usage in favor of the UFC brand, but Zuffa was retained as the legal name of the company.

In April 2023, Endeavor announced that UFC would merge with the professional wrestling promotion WWE to form TKO Group Holdings, a new public company majority-owned by Endeavor, replacing Zuffa as parent entity of the UFC. Vince McMahon was appointed as an executive chairman of the new entity, and White remained as UFC president. The merger was completed on September 12, 2023. Zuffa Parent, LLC, now operating as a TKO subsidiary legally known as TKO Operating Company (TKO OpCo), remains through Zuffa, LLC, as the copyright and IP holder of various UFC events and trademarks.

In June 2025, the "Zuffa" brand was revived by TKO for their new boxing promotion in partnership with Sela, named Zuffa Boxing.

== Sale to Endeavor and merger with WWE ==
Around May 11, 2016, ESPN's Darren Rovell reported that Goldman Sachs was helping Zuffa set up a sale of its majority ownership to one of four bidders at a speculated price range between $3.5 billion to $4 billion. Immediately after Rovell reported this, UFC President Dana White went on The Dan Patrick Show and denied that the UFC was up for sale, claiming that Zuffa was more focused on "working on deals and our expansion globally" than selling the promotion. However, White would further add that Zuffa would be listening to offers if they met the reported $4 billion. Despite White's denial of a potential sale, Dave Meltzer of SB Nation's mmafighting.com reported a month later that the sale of the UFC was imminent, as Zuffa received two bids within the range of $3.9 billion to $4.2 billion from both WME-IMG, the events and China Media Capital.

Finally, on July 11, after months of speculation, the UFC released a statement confirming that Zuffa had sold its majority stake to an ownership group headed by WME-IMG for $4.2 billion. ESPN's Darren Rovell and Brett Okamoto would go on further to report that, despite the sale to WME-IMG, Dana White would be staying on with the UFC as President and would "be given a stake in the new business." They would also add that the Abu Dhabi-based Flash Entertainment would still maintain its 10 percent stake in the company. In 2017, WME-IMG reorganized as Endeavor. On April 29, 2021, Endeavor launched an initial public offering (IPO) and became a publicly traded company listed on New York Stock Exchange. Endeavor subsequently used some of the proceeds from the IPO to buy out Zuffa's other shareholders at a value of $1.7 billion, making Zuffa a wholly owned subsidiary of Endeavor.

From the start of 2023, professional wrestling promotion WWE began exploring a potential sale of the company, amidst an employee misconduct scandal involving its owner Vince McMahon that had prompted him to step down as chairman and CEO, although he returned as executive chairman. In April 2023, Endeavor and WWE announced a merger to form TKO Group Holdings, a new public company majority-owned by Endeavor, with McMahon serving as executive chairman of the new entity, Nick Khan becoming president of WWE, and Dana White maintaining his position as president of the UFC. The merger was completed on September 12, 2023.

== Relationship with other organizations ==
=== Flash Entertainment ===
On January 12, 2010, Zuffa sold a minority interest in the company to Flash Entertainment. The company announced the completion of a deal in which a 10-percent interest in the company to the Abu Dhabi government-owned Flash Entertainment. With the sale, company ownership would be 40.5 percent held by Lorenzo Fertitta, the company's CEO and chairman, 40.5 percent held by his older brother, Frank Fertitta III, 10 percent by Flash Entertainment and nine percent by Dana White. Flash Entertainment was formed in 2008 by the Abu Dhabi government's Executive Affairs Authority.

=== Ubisoft ===
In December 2010, Zuffa filed a lawsuit against video game publisher Ubisoft, for what they claimed was a violation of trademark on the game, Fighters Uncaged, packaging. On the packaging of the game the trademarked term, "Ultimate Fighting" is shown in all capital letters. Zuffa claimed that the use of the term is identical or confusingly similar to the use of the UFC's trademarks. While Ubisoft failed to provide any comments on the lawsuit, by August 2011, the two companies announced the dissolution of the lawsuit.

=== Lone Survivor Foundation ===
In May 2011, it was announced that Zuffa would be holding a charity auction featuring more than 100 items to benefit the Lone Survivor Foundation during the last week of May 2011. All products were autographed by UFC fighters and included baseball caps, T-shirts, MMA gloves, and DVDs. Products generally ranged in price from $50 to a few thousand dollars.

=== Cleveland Clinic ===
In February 2014, Zuffa was one of a number of major combat sport promotions to support a major brain trauma study that was being conducted by the Cleveland Clinic. This was further followed up in February 2016, when Zuffa donated a million dollars to the Ruvo Center.
