= Station Casino Reno =

Proposed building

- Interactive map of Station Casino Reno
- Location: Reno, Nevada, U.S.; 39.482993°N 119.792496°W
- Theme: Modern
- No. of rooms: 500
- Gaming space: 84,000 sq ft (7,800 m^{2})

Station Casino Reno is a cancelled hotel and casino that was located at the intersection of Kietzke Lane and South Virginia Street next to the Reno-Sparks Convention Center in Reno, Nevada. The land was owned by Station Casinos and was located on 8 acres (3.2 ha) of land.

The building design was similar to Aliante (formerly known as Aliante Station), Green Valley Ranch and Red Rock Resort.
