= Aliante, North Las Vegas =

Master-planned community in Nevada, US

Coordinates: 36°17′33″N 115°11′02″W

Aliante is a master-planned community located in North Las Vegas, Nevada. In 2001, American Nevada Corporation and Del Webb Corporation formed North Valley Enterprises, which purchased 1,900 acres (770 ha) of land in the city and began construction of the community a year later, with the opening held in May 2003. Aliante is located in the city's northwestern area.

== History ==
Mike Montandon moved to North Las Vegas in 1992, at a time when 7,500 acres (3,000 ha) of land in the city, owned by the Bureau of Land Management (BLM), was labeled for use as a future master-planned community. Montandon became the mayor of North Las Vegas in 1997, and pushed for the land to be sold as one contiguous piece. Approximately 1,900 acres (770 ha) were auctioned in May 2001. North Valley Enterprises, a joint-venture affiliate of Del Webb Corporation and American Nevada Corporation, won the auction with a $47.2-million bid, at approximately $25,000 per acre. On August 13, 2002, North Valley Enterprises announced the 1,900-acre Aliante master-planned community.

The community was ultimately expected to include 7,500 homes and 20,000 residents. D. R. Horton, KB Home, Pardee Homes and Pulte, four of the top six home builders in the Las Vegas Valley, were scheduled to begin construction on the community's first 1,750 homes in October 2002, with sales starting the following month and a grand opening set for April 2003. Most of Aliante's neighborhoods would be priced between $130,000 and $200,000, while some larger homes, starting at 3,000 sq ft (280 m^{2}), would sell for $270,000.

North Valley Enterprises was required to set aside 22 percent of its property for public and recreation purposes, as part of its development agreement with the North Las Vegas government. The community would include a trail system, a public 18-hole, 6,900-yard golf course, and 45 acres (18 ha) of park land that would include an amphitheater, soccer fields and tennis and volleyball courts. Montandon said, "We had to walk that fine line between how much (land) we leave on the table for the developer and how much do we extract so the community of North Las Vegas benefits 10, 15, 20 years down the road."

The community was also to include two elementary schools and a middle school, all of which would be built by the Clark County School District. Property had also been selected for a fire station and a potential library. Aliante was zoned for 100 acres (40 ha) of commercial property, which included 40 acres (16 ha) for a hotel and casino to be located at Simmons Street and the Las Vegas Beltway. Montandon was initially against a casino being included in Aliante, but was later convinced that it was a good idea. Prior to Aliante's announcement, North Las Vegas had been considered the Las Vegas Valley's lower-class area, with a reputation for high crime.

Groundbreaking took place in August 2002. Aliante celebrated its official grand opening on May 3, 2003. At that time, Kilduff estimated that the community would take approximately five years to be entirely built out, contingent on demand. Aliante's first phase consisted of approximately 1,750 single-family detached homes, ranging from the mid-$100,000s to the upper-$200,000s. By the time of opening, the BLM was planning to auction the remaining 5,595 acres (2,264 ha) over the next several years. Montandon said that Aliante would help retain residents once they become financially successful, saying, "One of the problems we have is that people move out of North Las Vegas when they have a little success." Montandon also said that for the first few years, Aliante would likely cost more money than it could generate in taxes: "Rooftops are a drain on resources, police, fire and parks. But then come the restaurants and grocery stores." At that time, it was expected that Aliante's casino would not be built for years. Construction began on Aliante's first commercial office building in September 2004, with a scheduled completion date in the second quarter of 2005. At that time, Aliante's first shopping center, anchored by a Smith's grocery store, was set to finish construction by fall 2005.

In 2004, Aliante was the sixth top-selling master-planned community in the United States. Among master-planned communities in southern Nevada, Aliante was rated number one for new home closings during the first quarter of 2005, with 355 recorded closings. Aliante later ranked number four on a list of the top five best-selling master-planned communities in 2005, but did not rank on the list for 2006.

=== Sun City Aliante ===
Sun City Aliante, an age-restricted 55-plus community by Del Webb, was completed in March 2003, and is located within Aliante. Sun City Aliante was the third best-selling age-restricted community in the Las Vegas Valley during the second quarter of 2003, with 130 closings averaging $181,198. Sun City Aliante became the third best-selling community of 2003, with 400 home closings.

== Attractions and amenities ==
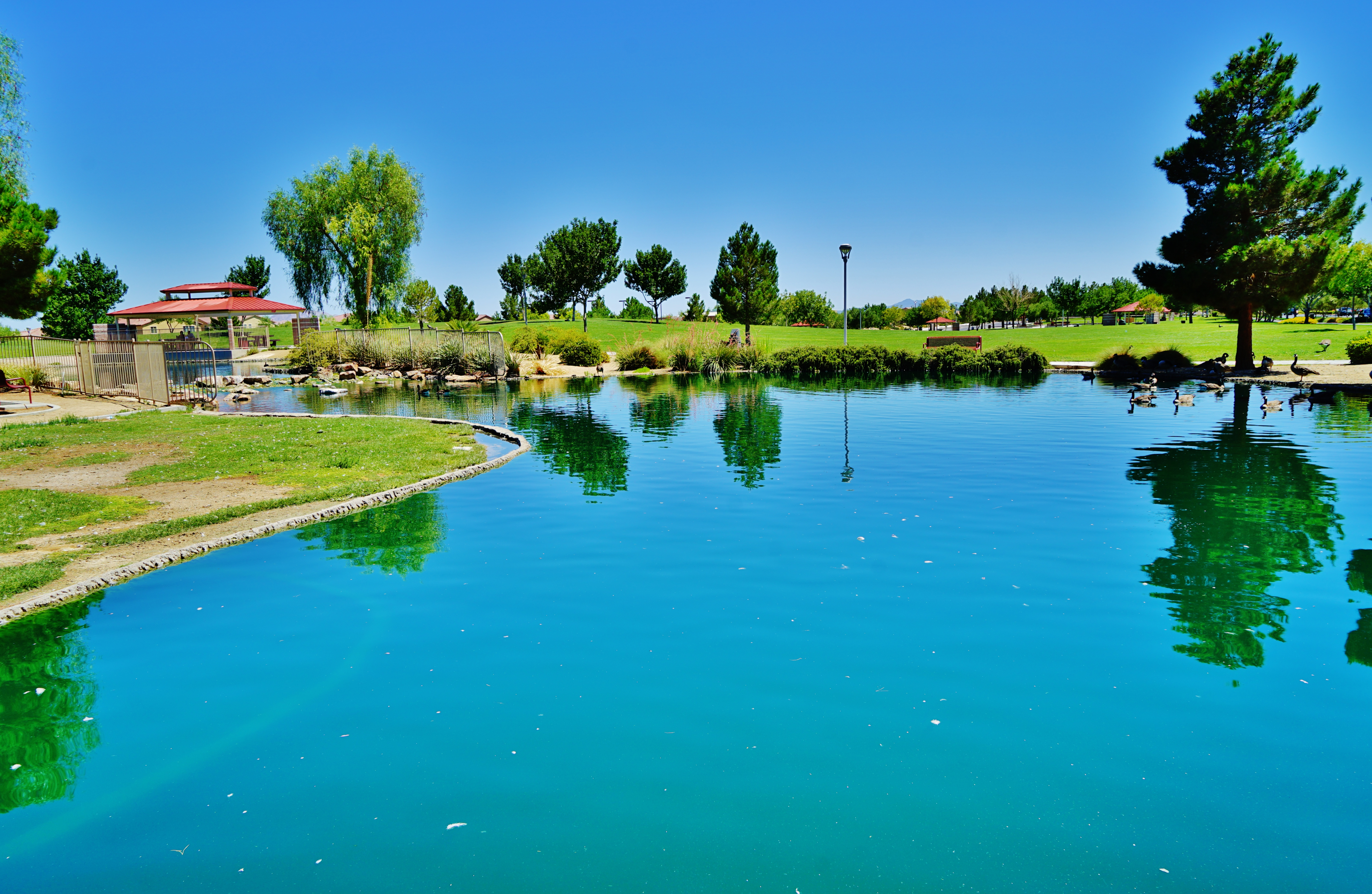
Aliante Nature Discovery Park

- Aliante Casino and Hotel, a 211-room hotel and 125,000 sq ft (11,600 m^{2}) casino, initially opened as the Aliante Station in 2008.
- Aliante Golf Club, a public golf course located in Sun City Aliante. The 65-acre course opened in December 2003.
- Aliante Library, built at a cost of $5.2 million and opened on May 24, 2006. The Aliante Library was the second library to open in North Las Vegas, after the North Las Vegas Library opened more than 40 years earlier.
- Aliante Nature Discovery Park, the main park in Aliante. It opened in May 2003.
