= Marnell Corrao Associates =

American architecture firm in Nevada

- Company type: privately held company
- Industry: architecture
- Founded: 1974
- Headquarters: Enterprise, Nevada

Marnell Corrao Associates is a privately held company specializing in architecture and general contracting services that is based in Enterprise, Nevada. The company was founded in 1974 and is the country’s oldest and largest hotel casino design/build firm.

The company specializes in large-scale projects and concentrates their efforts in the casino arena.

== History ==
By 2002, the company had completed construction of over 55,000 hotel rooms and over 70,000 by 2005.

Received approval on October 17, 2005, for a new project on Las Vegas Boulevard in Henderson. The project, named M Resort, is located on a 79-acre (32 ha) site. The casino opened on March 1, 2009.

Marnell Companies worked with Square One and construction company Osage Manhatta Builders on the Osage Casino Hotel-Ponca City, Oklahoma in 2012-13.

== Architecture projects ==
- Bellagio
- Boulder Station
- Forum Shops
- Stardust
- Rio All Suite Hotel and Casino
- Avi Resort & Casino
- Borgata
- Wynn Las Vegas
- Texas Station
- Lumiere Place
- XpressWest
