= Wild Wild West Gambling Hall & Hotel =

Historic demolished hotel and casino in Nevada, United States

Coordinates: 36.1016°N 115.1849°W

Days Inn – Wild Wild West Gambling Hall & Hotel
- Interactive map of Days Inn – Wild Wild West Gambling Hall & Hotel
- Location: Paradise, Nevada, U.S.; 3330 West Tropicana Avenue
- Opened: 1974; 52 years ago
- Closed: September 7, 2022; 3 years ago
- Theme: Old West
- No. of rooms: 260
- Gaming space: 11,250 sq ft (1,045 m^{2})
- Casino type: Land-based
- Owner: Station Casinos
- Previous names: King 8 Hotel and Casino
- Renovated in: 1998

The Wild Wild West Gambling Hall & Hotel was a hotel and casino in Paradise, Nevada, near the Las Vegas Strip. It was owned and operated by Station Casinos. While the casino and adjoining 260-room hotel were relatively small, the site is over 58 acres (23 ha) in size.

The Wild Wild West Plaza was located in the parking area and provides services common to a convenience store.

== History ==
Built in 1974, the property originally operated as the King 8 Hotel and Casino. The King 8 was owned by Will Roberts and Olind Jenni, who also owned a King 8 hotel in Fairbanks, Alaska. In February 1988, the King 8 was purchased by the Los Angeles-based Hotel Investors Trust, which planned improvements of the hotel-casino at a cost between $15 million and $17 million.

In 1996, J.A. Tiberti Construction Company purchased the King 8 from Starwood Lodging Trust. In May 1998, after several months of discussions, Station Casinos announced a partnership agreement to lease the property from Tiberti and take over operations. At the time, the King 8 had 283 hotel rooms, a coffee shop, and 230 slot and video poker machines. The hotel's 250 employees had to reapply for their jobs under Station Casinos. The King 8 closed on July 1, 1998, to allow for remodeling. A new sportsbook and restaurant were among the improvements made at the King 8, which reopened as the Wild Wild West Gambling Hall & Hotel on July 13, 1998.

In 2005, Station Casinos started purchasing land next to the property it already owned. While no specific plans were announced, it was widely expected that this indicated a major redevelopment at the location.

By 2008, the site had evolved to nearly 1/2-square-mile or 110 acres (45 ha) at a cost of $335 million. With a working title of Viva, the three casino, hotel condo arena project would cost $10 billion to develop.

Stations Casinos reached an agreement with Days Inn in 2009 to market the casino hotel under the Days Inn brand. The hotel was branded as Days Inn by Wyndham – Las Vegas at Wild Wild West Gambling Hall. As part of the negotiations, the rooms were remodeled to bring them up to Days Inn standards.

On September 2, 2022, Station announced that it would close and demolish Wild Wild West to prepare the site for future development, in connection with adjoining acreage. It closed on September 7, 2022. In April 2023, Station agreed to sell 49 acres (20 ha) of the site to the Oakland Athletics, to be developed as a stadium for the team's anticipated relocation to Las Vegas only for this to be changed to the Tropicana Las Vegas a month later.
