= Lorenzo Fertitta =

American entrepreneur

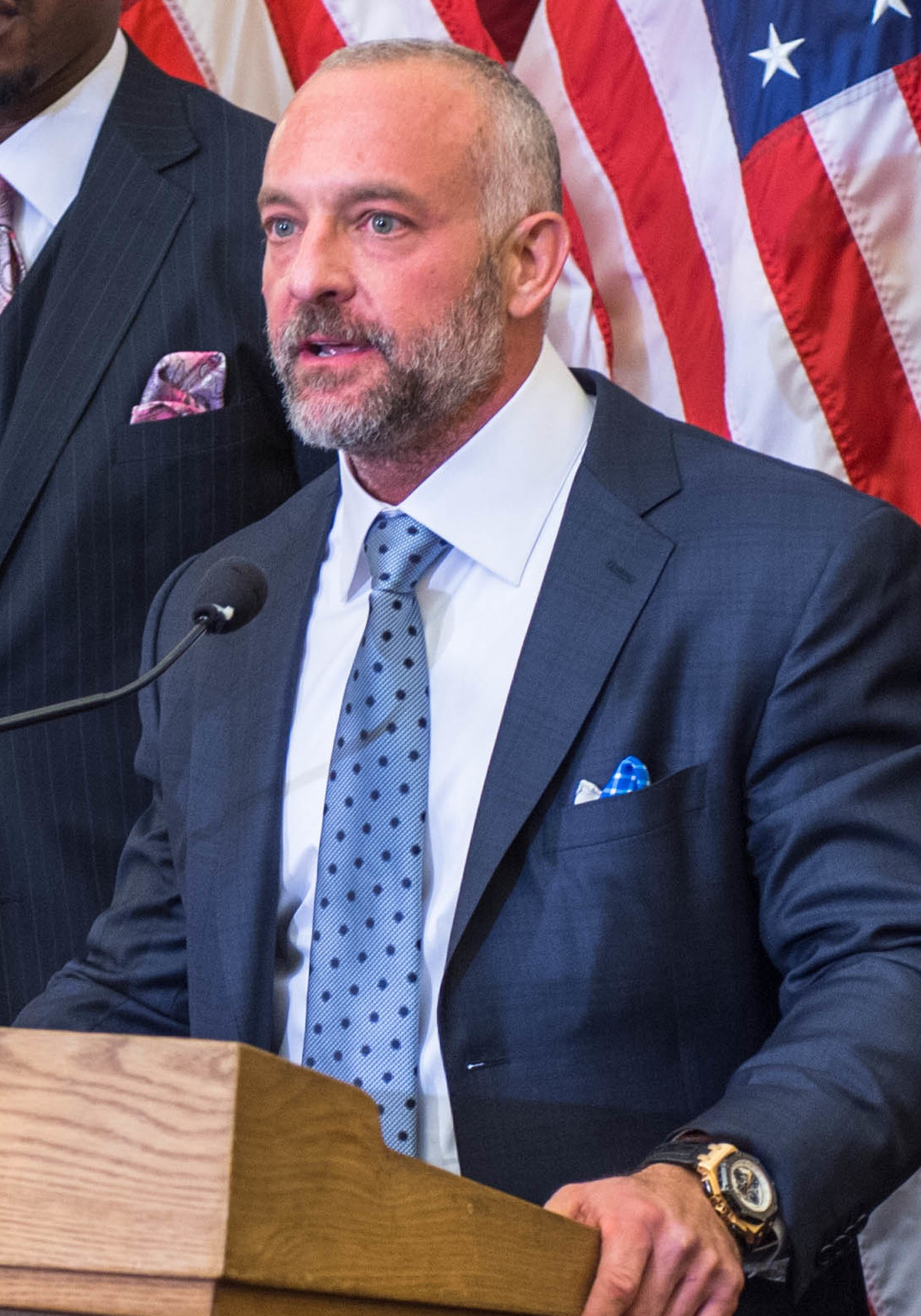
- Fertitta in 2014
- Born: Lorenzo Joseph Fertitta; January 3, 1969 (age 57); Las Vegas, Nevada, U.S.
- Education: University of San Diego (BBA); New York University (MBA)
- Occupation: Businessman
- Spouse: Teresa Fertitta
- Children: 3
- Father: Frank Fertitta Jr.
- Relatives: Frank Fertitta III (brother); Tilman Fertitta (cousin)

Lorenzo Joseph Fertitta (born January 3, 1969) is an American billionaire businessman. He is chairman of Fertitta Capital, director of Red Rock Resorts Inc, and former CEO of the Ultimate Fighting Championship.

== Early life and education ==
Lorenzo and his older brother Frank Fertitta III were raised in Las Vegas, Nevada, after their father, Frank Fertitta Jr., moved there from Texas with his wife Victoria (née Broussard) in 1960. Fertitta Jr. became a dealer at the Stardust Casino before graduating to management positions at the Tropicana, Sahara and Circus Circus casinos.

In 1976, after observing that no casinos effectively catered to the city's residents, Fertitta Jr. built The Casino, a 5,000-square-foot establishment on Sahara Blvd. The Casino would be renamed Bingo Palace before it eventually became Palace Station.

Fertitta Jr. worked at Station Casinos, a developer and casino operator in the U.S., alongside his sons until retiring in 1993. Until his death in 2009, Fertitta Jr. remained active in other family business ventures, community service and philanthropic efforts, with Las Vegas mayor Oscar Goodman referring to Fertitta Jr. as "one of the most successful business persons in the history of Las Vegas."

Fertitta graduated from Bishop Gorman High School, a private Catholic prep school in Las Vegas, Nevada, in 1987. He earned a Bachelor of Business Administration from the University of San Diego in 1991 where he was a member of Sigma Pi fraternity. He earned an MBA from the Stern School of Business at New York University in 1993.

== Career ==
=== Fertitta Enterprises ===
Since 1991, Fertitta occupied various executive positions within Fertitta Enterprises, a family investment office and entertainment company. He served as vice president from 1991 to 1993, before becoming president and CEO from June 1993 to July 2000. In these roles, Fertitta managed an investment portfolio consisting of marketable securities and real property.

=== Station Casinos and Red Rock Resorts, Inc. ===
Throughout their time in high school and college, Lorenzo and Frank III worked for their father, Frank Fertitta Jr., at Station Casinos. After Fertitta Jr. retired in 1993, Lorenzo and Frank III led Station Casinos to its first IPO that same year, raising $294 million and becoming principal shareholders and co-founders of Station Casinos Inc. in the process. Station Casinos was then taken private in 2007 in a management-led leveraged buyout.

On February 2, 2009, Station Casinos declared plans to file for bankruptcy. The filing came in response to a lawsuit that challenged the gaming company's debt swap and prepackaged bankruptcy proposal. Station Casinos filed for Chapter 11 bankruptcy on July 28, 2009, and, with a subsequent reinvestment of $240 million, emerged from this process in June 2011 with a new ownership structure that allowed the Fertittas to retain full control.

On October 13, 2015, Red Rock Resorts, Inc. filed an S-1 registration statement with the SEC to take Station Casinos public again through an initial public offering (IPO), creating a holding company for the organization, known as Red Rock Resorts, Inc., which owns a portion of the Station Casinos entity. On April 26, 2016, Red Rock Resorts, Inc. raised $531.4 million in an IPO that priced 27.25 million shares under the ticker symbol "RRR". Deutsche Bank Securities, J.P Morgan, BofA Merrill Lynch and Goldman Sachs & Co were among the underwriters for the offering. The Fertitta family continues to own a stake in Red Rock Resorts Inc. In January 2017, Fertitta was named Vice Chairman.

Fertitta as owner of the Palms Casino nightclub KAOS lost an $8 million lawsuit in 2022 brought by DJ Kaskade for nonpayment of his two-year performance contract.

=== Zuffa, LLC and Ultimate Fighting Championship ===
In 2001, Lorenzo, along with his brother Frank III, established Zuffa, LLC to acquire the assets of Ultimate Fighting Championship (UFC), a mixed martial arts promotion and live event provider, from Semaphore Entertainment Group for $2 million. Lorenzo Fertitta assumed positions as chairman and CEO of UFC, while appointing childhood friend Dana White as President of the organization. Zuffa, LLC operated the UFC until its sale in August 2016.

As chairman and CEO of UFC, Fertitta worked with the athletic commissions of New Jersey, Nevada, California and Mohegan Sun to establish a unified rule set for MMA competitions. The sport operates in all 50 U.S. states and is broadcast to more than 150 countries. Approximately 135 UFC-branded gyms operate in North America and Australia.

In January 2005, UFC entered a deal to broadcast televised content on Viacom Inc.'s Spike cable channel, an agreement that ran until the end of 2011. On August 18, 2011, UFC and Fox Broadcasting Company announced a seven-year, $813 million television rights deal that spanned Fox's flagship channel, its cable channel FX, and other stations including Fuel TV and Fox Deportes.

As CEO of UFC, Fertitta worked with Governor of New York Andrew Cuomo to regulate MMA in the state, an initiative projected to yield more than $32 million in economic activity for New York's economy each year. Governor Cuomo signed legislation authorizing competitive mixed martial arts in New York State on April 14, 2016, with UFC hosting its first show at Madison Square Garden, UFC 205, later that year. The event set a record for live gate receipts at the venue, drawing $17.7 million.

In July 2016, Zuffa, LLC and the brothers announced the sale of their shares in UFC for an estimated $4 billion to WME-IMG, a sports and entertainment talent representation firm led by Ari Emanuel and Patrick Whitesell. Private equity firms Silver Lake Partners and Kohlberg Kravis Roberts (KKR) were also a part of the deal. Upon completion of the transaction, Lorenzo Fertitta stepped down from his role as CEO.

=== Fertitta Capital ===
On May 1, 2017, Fertitta Capital, a private investment firm, was launched with an initial seed investment of $500 million from Lorenzo and Frank Fertitta III. The firm has a permanent capital base and invests throughout a business's lifecycle and across the capital structure in consumer-facing companies in the technology, media and entertainment sectors. Nakisa Bidarian, former CFO of UFC, will lead Fertitta Capital as CEO and co-founder and be responsible for the deployment of the Firm's capital.

== Donations ==
Fertitta's donations include supporting his high school alma mater, Bishop Gorman, as well as the University of Nevada, Las Vegas (UNLV). In September 2016, the Fertitta family made a $10 million donation to UNLV to fund a 73,000-square-foot football facility that will be named The Fertitta Football Complex.

Fertitta made contributions to the Lone Survivor Foundation, the Fisher House and the Intrepid Fallen Heroes Fund, which provide support for the families of military personnel lost or severely wounded in service to the United States.

On November 11, 2016, Lorenzo and Frank III established the Fertitta Veterans Program at New York University Stern, a full-time MBA program designed to support U.S. military veterans' transition to business school. As part of the program, 20 full-time MBA military students receive scholarship support and participate in a six-week, six-credit summer term that facilitates their transition to the academic and professional communities.

In addition, Fertitta supports local Las Vegas charities including the Nathan Adelson Hospice, Catholic Charities of Southern Nevada, the Lou Ruvo Center for Brain Health and Three Square, a charity focused on providing wholesome food to those in need.

== Political activity ==
He is third-cousin to fellow entrepreneur Tilman Fertitta. Lorenzo and his wife are major donors to the Republican Party and Republican candidates, having given more than $9,700,000 from 2009 to 2020, making him, along with his brother, one of the largest contributors in Nevada.

Together with his spouse, Fertitta contributed $721,200 to Donald Trump's 2020 presidential campaign.

In May 2026, Democrats from the House Oversight Committee started investigation in potential corruption, self-dealing and mismanagement at the DHS regarding the purchase in 2026 by Immigration and Customs Enforcement of a Boeing 737 from Valkyrie Aviation which the latter acquired in September 2025 from Fertitta Enterprises.

== Personal life ==
Fertitta resides in Las Vegas, Nevada, with his wife Teresa and three children.

Fertitta owns the 87 meter yacht Lonian and the associated 66 meter support vessel Hodor. Cost of the ships is estimated at more than $160 million and annual maintenance at 10-15% of the purchase price. The yachts sail under the flag of the Cayman Islands.

== Memberships ==
- Former Chairman of the Nevada Resort Association
- Former Member of the Nevada State Athletic Commission (November 1996 to July 2000)
- Former Board Member with the American Gaming Association
- Former Advisory Board Member of Nevada First Bank
- Former President and chief executive officer of Gordon Biersch Brewing Company
- Director of Station Casinos LLC
- Director of Station Holdco LLC
- Vice Chairman of Red Rock Resorts, Inc.
