= Palace Station =

Casino hotel in Las Vegas, Nevada

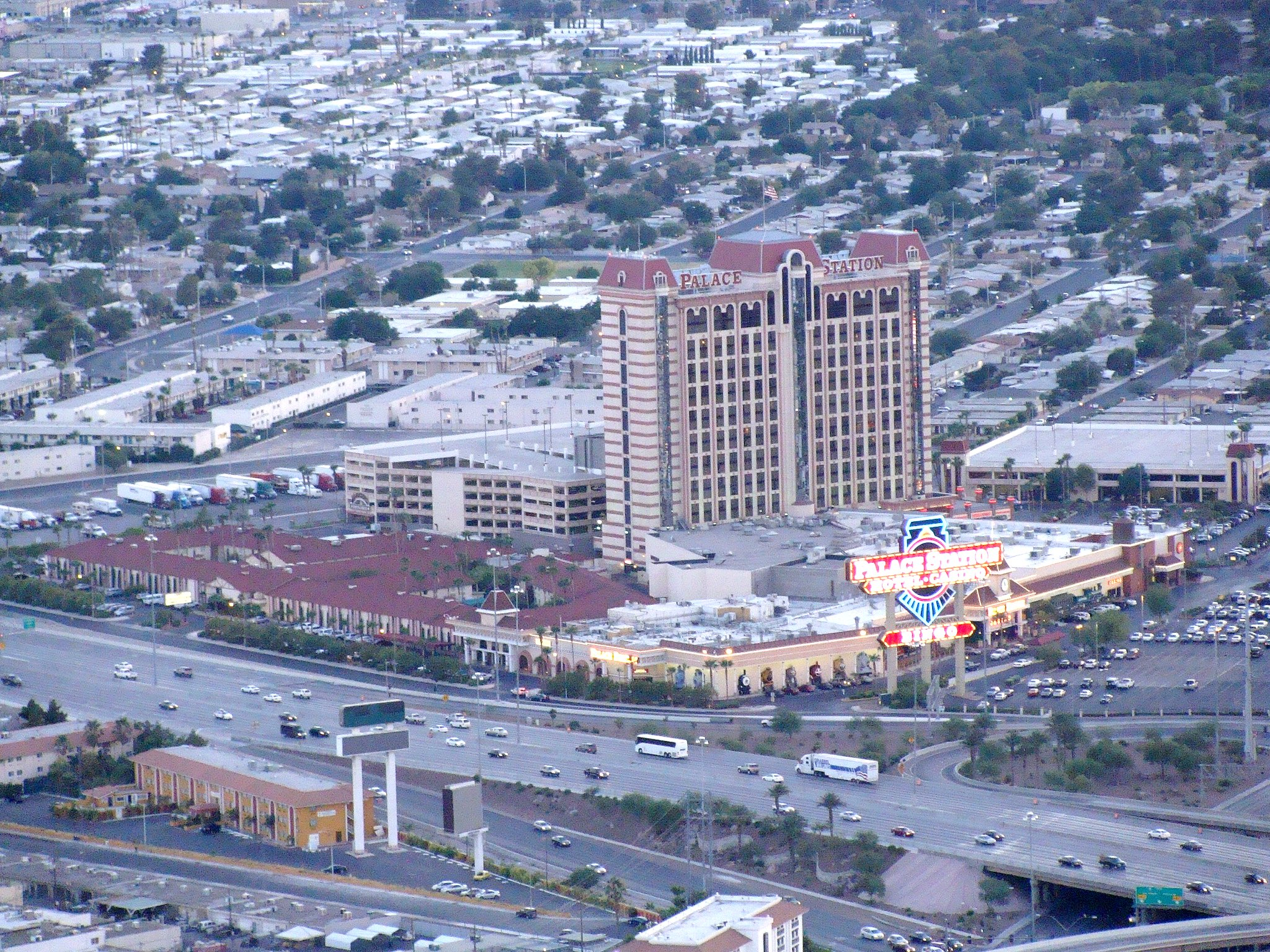
- Aerial view of Palace Station in 2010
- Interactive map of Palace Station
- Location: Las Vegas, Nevada, U.S.; 2411 West Sahara Avenue; 36°8′30″N 115°10′29″W
- Opened: July 1, 1976; 50 years ago
- No. of rooms: 575
- Gaming space: 84,000 sq ft (7,800 m^{2})
- Signature attractions: Cinebarre
- Notable restaurants: The Brass Fork (formerly Grand Café); Feast Buffet (1993–2020)
- Casino type: Land-based
- Owner: Station Casinos
- Previous names: The Casino (1976–77); Bingo Palace (1977–1984)
- Renovated in: 1977, 1983–84, 1990–91, 2016–2019
- Website: palacestation.com

Palace Station is a hotel and casino located in Las Vegas, Nevada. It is owned and operated by Station Casinos, and is the company's oldest property. It includes an 84,000 sq ft (7,800 m^{2}) casino and 575 rooms. Palace Station originally opened as The Casino on July 1, 1976, attached to the Mini Price motel. It was expanded and renamed a year later as Bingo Palace. The ownership group included Frank Fertitta Jr., who bought out his partners in 1979.

Bingo Palace was expanded further and renamed Palace Station in 1984. The motel was purchased by Fertitta the following year, becoming part of Palace Station, and a 21-story hotel tower opened in 1991. A $192 million renovation took place from November 2016 to March 2019, and included demolition of the original motel structure.

== History ==
Palace Station originally opened on July 1, 1976, as The Casino, a 5,000 sq ft (460 m^{2}) gambling hall attached to the Mini Price Motor Inn. The Casino was built in an off-Strip location beside Interstate 15, where few observers expected it to succeed. It was soon expanded by 10,000 sq ft (930 m^{2}) and renamed Bingo Palace, with the grand opening celebrated on June 30, 1977. The casino was the first in the Las Vegas Valley to target a clientele of local residents, with offerings like giveaways, cheap buffets and bingo. It thrived, and other locals casinos followed in later years, including Sam's Town (1979) and the Gold Coast (1986).

Carl Thomas, an executive of Argent Corporation, was among the original owners. Frank Fertitta Jr. bought a 10-percent interest in July 1977. He became vice president and director of the Bingo Palace later that year. In 1979, Thomas was under investigation for allegedly aiding mobsters in a skimming operation. Fertitta bought out his partners, including Thomas and two others, later that year.

A $10 million renovation and expansion was underway in 1983, and a contest was held to select a new name, as Fertitta wanted to emphasize that the casino offered more than bingo. Approximately 26,000 contest entries were made over a three-week period. The winning name, Palace Station, was submitted by a keno runner at Bingo Palace. Fertitta liked the name because it retained "Palace" while also reflecting the property's new train station/railroad theme. The name change became official on January 1, 1984. A grand opening ceremony was held on April 6, featuring Governor Richard Bryan and the historic locomotive Inyo. A train-themed neon sign, measuring 126 feet (38 m) wide and high, was constructed for Palace Station.

In 1985, Fertitta purchased the adjoining 465-room motel and rebranded it as part of Palace Station, allowing the casino to now target tourists as well. A $60 million expansion began five years later, and included 22,000 sq ft (2,000 m^{2}) in new casino space, as well as a parking garage. The project also included a 21-story hotel tower; it began construction on July 9, 1990, and was topped off that November. The expanded casino and three floors in the tower opened a month later, with the remainder of rooms expected to be finished in mid-1991.

In 1993, Palace Station filed to become a public corporation known as Station Casinos, which has gone on to open numerous other hotel-casinos throughout the Las Vegas Valley, starting in 1994 with Boulder Station.

In 1998, a 67-year-old woman won the largest slot machine jackpot in history at Palace Station: $27 million.

In 2016, employees narrowly rejected unionization efforts by the Culinary Workers Union and Bartenders Union, by a vote of 266 to 262. The vote was conducted by the National Labor Relations Board (NLRB). Culinary challenged the results, accusing Station of influencing its workers to vote against unionization by giving them raises just before the election. The union filed a complaint with the NLRB, and Palace Station agreed to settle in 2017, although a contract was never finalized.

A $192 million renovation began in November 2016, and was completed in March 2019. It was the property's first major renovation since 1991. Palace Station remained open during the project, which included the removal of the train theme in favor of a modern design. Eight faux locomotives on the front of the building were removed, and one was donated to the city's Neon Museum, along with a Palace Station neon sign measuring 50 feet (15 m) long. The 126-foot Palace Station sign was removed during 2018, marking the end of the train theme. A grand re-opening celebration, including a fireworks show, was held on September 1, 2018.

=== Incidents ===
A roof collapse and fire occurred on July 20, 1999, both during heavy rainfall. The roof collapse occurred over an area of the casino floor around 2 a.m., unleashing a wave of water on gamblers. Several hours later, a four-alarm fire began on a decorative exterior facade, located along the tower's 21st floor. More than 75 firefighters responded, although their 150-foot ladder could not reach the blaze. Instead, they had to break open hotel-room windows on the 20th floor and spray the fire from there.

The fire forced the evacuation of 2,200 guests, and caused extensive damage to the tower exterior. The facade contained a lighting circuit, and investigators believed the fire started because the circuit was either struck by lightning, or because rainwater got into its wiring and caused a short circuit. The hotel remained open up to the 15th floor, and other floors were reopened soon thereafter. The casino floor was partially reopened a day after the incidents, along with several restaurants. The total cost of damage for both incidents was between $12 million and $14 million. The damaged portion of the casino reopened four months later.

Various robberies have occurred at Palace Station throughout its history, the most prominent being a 2007 robbery led by O. J. Simpson, which occurred at the property's motel structure.

== Features ==
Palace Station includes an 84,000 sq ft (7,800 m^{2}) casino. The hotel tower is 21 stories, and has 575 rooms. The tower had brought the total room count to more than 1,000, including rooms in the original two-story motel. The latter, with approximately 447 rooms, was demolished in 2017 for new property features and future expansion.

In 2001, the Las Vegas Valley's population included 100,000 Asian residents. Palace Station began marketing to this demographic by introducing a gaming pit that featured blackjack, baccarat, and pai gow, all popular among Asian gamblers. The property continues to remain popular among this group.

The casino once included the Sound Trax lounge, which featured classic rock tribute bands. In 2001, the space was converted into the Laugh Trax comedy club, later named the Bonkerz Comedy Club. In 2010, Louie Anderson became Palace Station's headlining entertainer, performing there until 2013.

In 2001, Palace Station opened an Irish pub and restaurant. The casino also included a popular long-time restaurant known as the Broiler. The 2016–2019 renovation included a new bingo room, an expanded casino floor, and a Regal Cinemas movie theater known as Cinebarre, which offers dining. The project also added several new restaurants, including Boathouse Asian Eatery. The buffet was also relocated from the second floor to the main casino floor. Tacos & Taquila, a popular Mexican restaurant that closed on the Strip in 2018, briefly operated at Palace Station from 2022 to 2023.

== Gallery ==
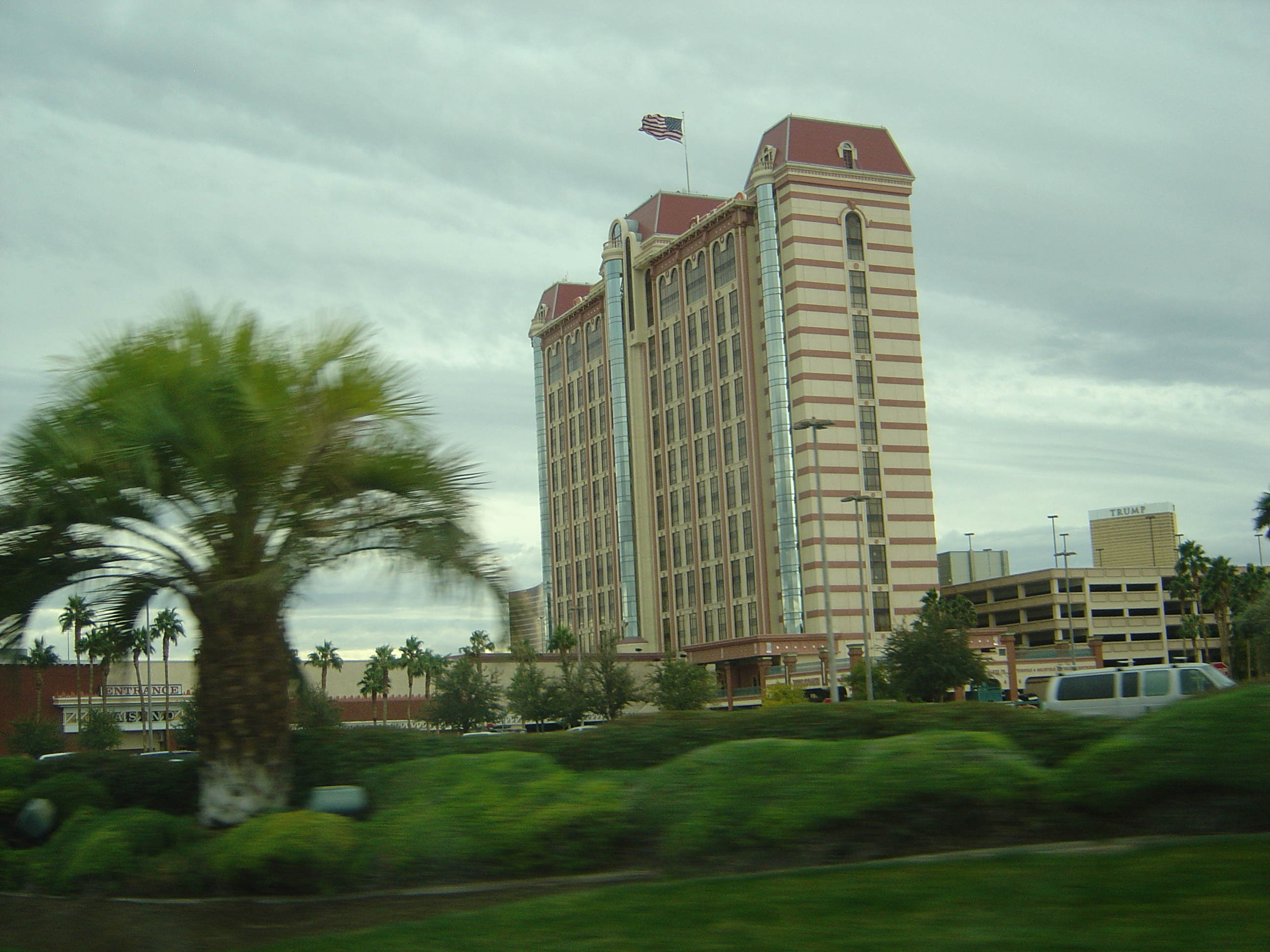
Hotel tower in 2010

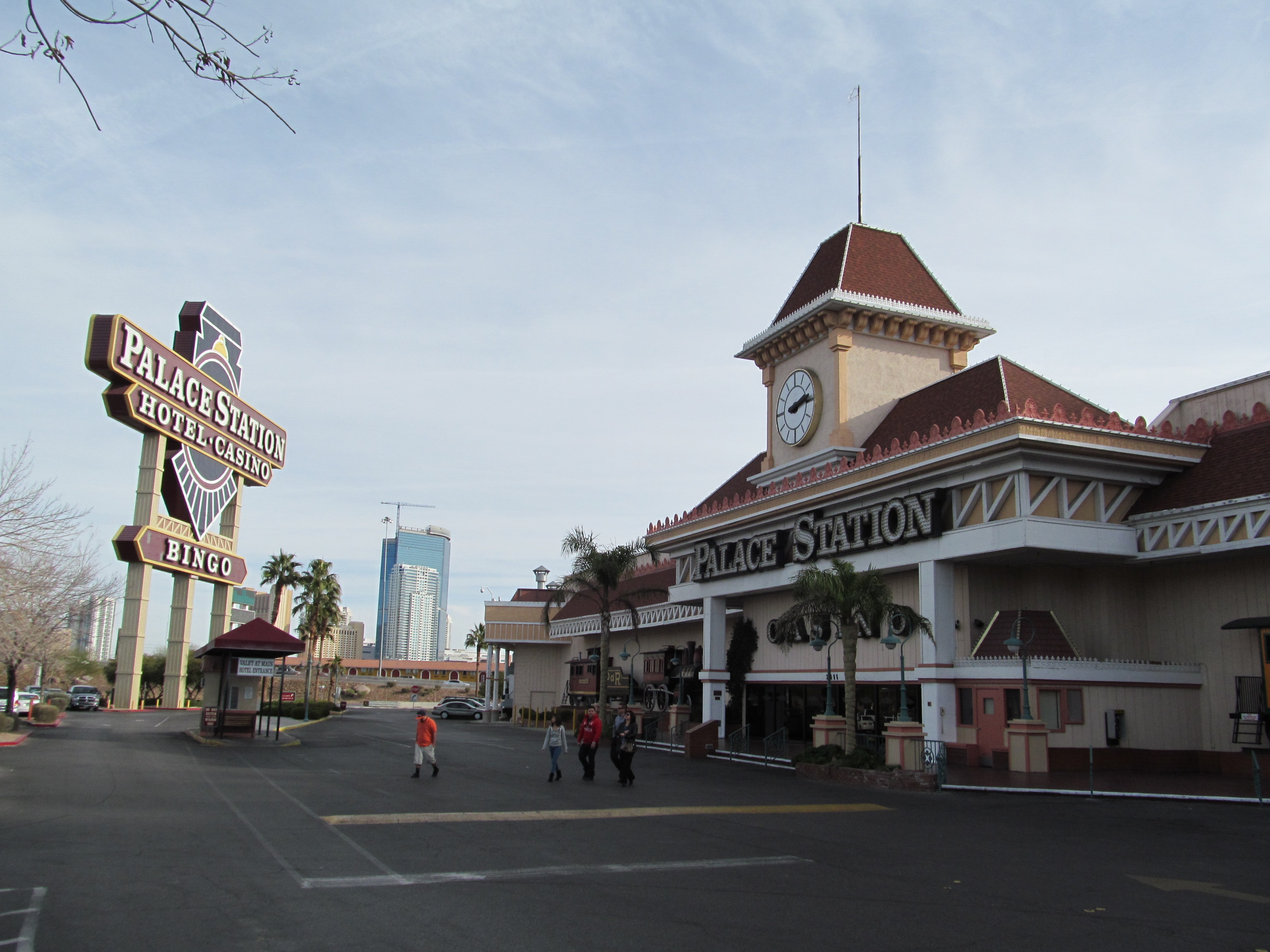
Palace Station in 2012

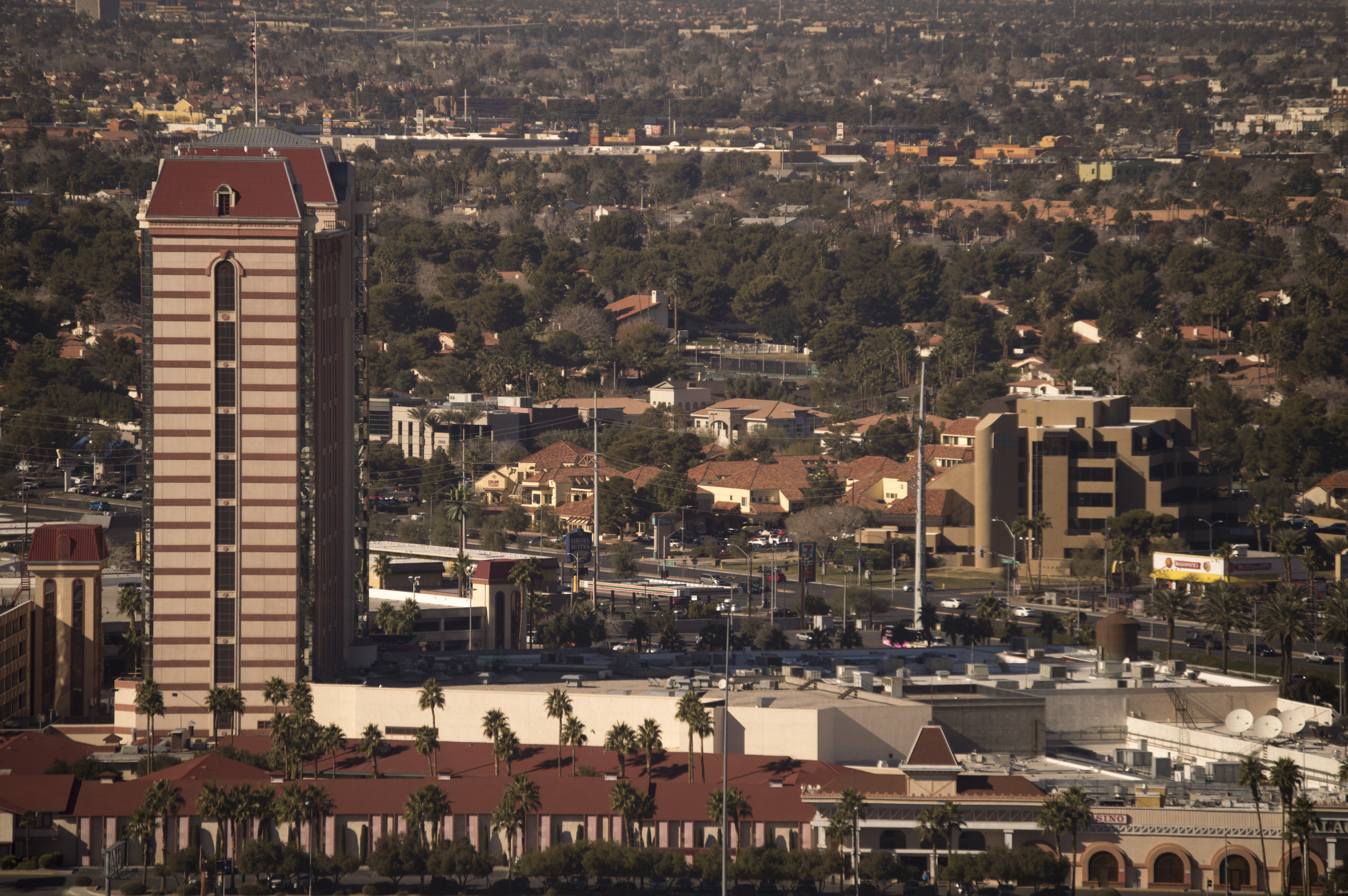
Hotel tower and casino in 2015
