= Station Casinos =

American hotel and casino gaming company

Station Casinos, LLC
- Type: Joint venture
- Industry: Gaming and hospitality
- Founded: July 1, 1976; 50 years ago, in Las Vegas, Nevada, U.S.
- Founder: Frank Fertitta Jr.
- Headquarters: Summerlin South, Nevada, U.S.
- Area served: Nevada
- Key people: Frank Fertitta III (CEO and president); Lorenzo Fertitta (chairman)
- Revenue: $1.7 billion (2023)
- Net income: $338 million (2023)
- Total assets: $4.0 billion (2023)
- Owner: Frank Fertitta III & Lorenzo Fertitta (48%)
- Number of employees: 9,385 (2024)
- Divisions: Wildfire Gaming
- Website: stationcasinos.com

Red Rock Resorts, Inc.
- Traded as: Nasdaq: RRR (Class A); Russell 2000 component; S&P 600 component
- Founded: April 26, 2016; 10 years ago
- Website: redrockresorts.com

Station Casinos, LLC is an American hotel and casino company based in Las Vegas suburb of Summerlin South, Nevada, and founded by Frank Fertitta Jr. Station Casinos, along with Affinity Gaming, Boyd Gaming and Golden Entertainment, dominate the locals casino market in Las Vegas. The company purchased several sites that were gaming-entitled, meaning that major casinos can be built at that location without additional approvals. There are only a limited number of such sites available in the Las Vegas area. Station Casinos has also branched out into managing casinos that they do not own. Red Rock Resorts, Inc. (Nasdaq: RRR) is a publicly traded holding company that owns a portion of Station Casinos.

== History ==
The first Station Casinos property, Palace Station, is located in Las Vegas and originally opened as The Casino on July 1, 1976, which is considered the company's founding date. The Casino was renamed the Bingo Palace in 1977. Frank Fertitta Jr., the founder of Station Casinos, bought a 10-percent stake in the casino later that year and became its vice president and director. He bought out his partners in 1979, then expanded the casino and renamed it Palace Station in 1984.

Nearly a decade later, Fertitta filed to make the Palace Station a public company known as Station Casinos. The stock began trading on May 25, 1993. Fertitta held the position of chairman, but retired from the company that year. Control was taken over by family members, including his son Frank Fertitta III, who took the position of chairman, president, and chief executive officer.

The initial public offering helped finance the company's second Las Vegas property, Boulder Station, which opened in 1994. It is located along Boulder Highway in the eastern Las Vegas Valley. In Missouri, the company also opened the St. Charles riverboat casino in 1994. Meanwhile, Fertitta had begun construction on his own hotel-casino project, the Texas, located in North Las Vegas. Station shareholders objected to Fertitta branching out into the gaming industry on his own, prompting the company to purchase the Texas in 1995, shortly before its opening.

In Henderson, Nevada, Station opened the Sunset Station in 1997, followed by Green Valley Ranch in 2001, the latter in partnership with American Nevada Corporation. Station also purchased several existing properties in the Las Vegas Valley, including the Santa Fe in 2000, and the Fiesta and Reserve in 2001.

In 2005, there were plans to develop two casinos in Reno: Station Casino Reno and Mount Rose Station. In 2020, the land was sold.

Station opened its Red Rock Resort in 2006. It was built in the Las Vegas community of Summerlin at a cost of $925 million, making it Station's most expensive property.

On December 4, 2006, Fertitta Colony Partners made a highly leveraged offer to purchase all existing shares at $82 per share and take the company private. The partnership consisted of Fertitta III and his brother Lorenzo, along with Colony Capital LLC. The Fertitta brothers, their sister Delise Sartini, and her husband Blake L. Sartini, with a combined investment of $870.1 million, purchased a 25% stake in Fertitta Colony Partners. Colony Capital contributed $2.6 billion for a 75% share. The buyout was completed on November 7, 2007.

On July 28, 2009, Station Casinos filed for Chapter 11 bankruptcy. Station Casinos' filing listed $5.7 billion in assets against $6.5 billion in debt. The filing said the company had 510 holders of unsecured and subordinate debt totaling $4.4 billion.

Station Casinos exited bankruptcy on June 17, 2011, with $4 billion less in debt and with creditors putting the company's 18 casinos back in the hands of the Fertitta family and their partners. The Fertitta brothers agreed to put nearly $200 million in the reassembled company and now own 45 percent of its shares. The other new equity owners include the company's main lenders, Deutsche Bank AG, which holds 25 percent; JPMorgan Chase with a 15 percent stake; and former bondholders with an additional 15 percent, according to lawyers on the deal.

Station Casinos announced on October 13, 2015, that it would return to the stock market with an initial public offering. On April 26, 2016, Red Rock Resorts, Inc., a new holding company owning a portion of Station Casinos, went public on the NASDAQ Stock Exchange.

In 2016, Station Casinos purchased the Palms Casino Resort for $313 million. The company then spent more than $600 million on renovations, which failed to restore the resort to its former prominence. The Palms was sold to the San Manuel Band of Mission Indians in 2021, for $650 million. That year, the company announced that it would proceed with Durango, a long-planned resort in the southwest Las Vegas Valley. It opened at the end of 2023.

Several casino properties in the Las Vegas Valley – Texas Station, Fiesta Rancho, and Fiesta Henderson – were closed in 2020 amid the COVID-19 pandemic and never reopened. Station announced in 2022 that it would demolish the properties and sell the land to finance future projects. The demolition was viewed by analysts as a defensive move to prevent future competition from gaming rivals. Station also announced in 2022 that it would close and demolish its Wild Wild West Gambling Hall & Hotel, located in the Las Vegas Valley as well. The site will be redeveloped in connection with adjoining acreage.

In 2025, Station began operating the sportsbook at the Treasure Island Hotel and Casino, marking the company's debut on the Las Vegas Strip. It also began operating the sportsbooks at two other properties, CasaBlanca Resort and the Virgin River, both located in nearby Mesquite, Nevada.

=== Union dispute ===
Station Casinos has been involved in a long-time feud with the Culinary Workers Union, which represents the majority of resort workers in Las Vegas. The feud began in 2000, when Station purchased the Santa Fe. Workers there had already voted seven years earlier for representation, although a contract was never finalized under the former ownership. When Station took over, it required that all of the property's employees re-apply for their jobs, to the disagreement of the Culinary Workers Union. The union has since targeted other Station properties over the years in an effort to unionize them.

In 2019, the Culinary Workers Union filed 16 unfair labor practice charges with the National Labor Relations Board (NLRB) against Station Casinos, with the union alleging that workers received discriminatory work assignments and were threatened with being fired for supporting unionization. In June 2024, the NLRB ruled against Station Casinos, finding that the company had committed "extensive coercive and unlawful misconduct" as part of a "carefully crafted corporate strategy intentionally designed at every step to interfere with employees’ free choice" to unionize or not. As part of its ruling, the NLRB also issued a remedial bargaining order, also known as a Cemex bargaining order, which requires an employer that is found to have illegally interfered with a union election to immediately recognize and bargain with the union, rather than ordering a new election.

=== Restaurants ===
In 2008, due to the negative effects of the Great Recession, Station Casinos began leasing out restaurant space at its properties to outside operators. In 2011, the company was financially secure enough to resume management of these spaces, several of which were branded under the name Grand Cafe. These locations would again rebrand in 2021, some as Lucky Penny and others as Brass Fork.

Station also operated a chain of buffets at its properties, starting in the 1990s. Known as Feast Buffet, the chain operated until 2020, when most buffets in Las Vegas closed permanently as a result of the COVID-19 pandemic.

In 2024, Station began opening a chain of standalone bar-restaurants known as Seventy Six Tavern, the name referencing the company's 1976 founding.

=== Wildfire Gaming ===
Wildfire Gaming is a division of Station that operates small casinos around the Las Vegas Valley. Wildfire-branded casinos are smaller than Station's other properties and lack hotel rooms. The original property, known simply as Wildfire Casino, opened in 2001. The 20,000 sq ft (1,900 m^{2}) casino included six table games and more than 200 slot machines. Station purchased it in 2003, and opened additional Wildfire casinos starting in 2008.

A 21,000 sq ft (2,000 m^{2}) Wildfire was opened in downtown Las Vegas in 2023. It was built on five acres, occupying a portion of the former Castaways Hotel and Casino site, which Station had purchased in 2004. Compared to previous Wildfire casinos, the new location features a more upscale design which will be integrated into existing and future locations.

== Current casinos ==
Station Casinos
Casino	Gaming area	Opening date	Notes
Boulder Station	89,443 sq ft (8,309.5 m^{2})	August 23, 1994; 32 years ago	
Durango Casino and Resort	83,178 sq ft (7,727.5 m^{2})	December 5, 2023; 2 years ago	
Green Valley Ranch	143,891 sq ft (13,367.9 m^{2})	December 18, 2001; 24 years ago	
Palace Station	84,000 sq ft (7,800 m^{2})	July 1, 1976; 50 years ago	Previously operated as The Casino (1976–1977) and Bingo Palace (1977–1984)
Red Rock Casino, Resort & Spa	118,309 sq ft (10,991.3 m^{2})	April 18, 2006; 20 years ago	
Santa Fe Station	151,001 sq ft (14,028.5 m^{2})	February 14, 1991; 35 years ago	Originally opened as the Santa Fe. It was sold to Station in 2000 and renamed Santa Fe Station.
Sunset Station	162,173 sq ft (15,066.4 m^{2})	June 10, 1997; 29 years ago	
Wildfire Rancho	6,800 sq ft (630 m^{2})	December 27, 2001; 24 years ago	Originally opened as the Wildfire Casino, it was sold to Station in 2003. It was the first in the Wildfire chain.
Wildfire Lanes	6,750 sq ft (627 m^{2})	June 26, 2008; 18 years ago	Previously known as Renata's.
Wildfire Boulder	6,700 sq ft (620 m^{2})	June 26, 2008; 18 years ago	Previously known as the Magic Star Casino, and acquired by Station in 2004.
Barley's	5,190 sq ft (482 m^{2})	January 18, 1996; 30 years ago	Part of Wildfire Gaming
Wildfire Sunset	4,700 sq ft (440 m^{2})	August 2, 2012; 14 years ago	Acquired by Station in 2004. Previously known as The Gold Rush, it was rebranded under the Wildfire name in 2012.
Wildfire Lake Mead	3,500 sq ft (330 m^{2})	June 6, 2014; 12 years ago	Previously operated as the Lake Mead Lounge.
Wildfire Anthem	3,500 sq ft (330 m^{2})	2013	Previously known as Doc Hollidays before being acquired by Station in 2013.
Wildfire Valley View	3,500 sq ft (330 m^{2})	2013	Previously operated as the Lift Bar before being acquired by Station in 2013.
Wildfire on Fremont	21,000 sq ft (2,000 m^{2})	February 10, 2023; 3 years ago	
The Greens Cafe	1,088 sq ft (101.1 m^{2})	1991	Acquired by Station in 2005. Part of Wildfire Gaming.

- Although not branded fully separately, Green Valley Ranch and Red Rock Resort are in a distinctly different upscale market niche from the other Station properties.

== Former casinos ==
Station Casinos
Casino	Gaming area	Opening date	Notes
Texas Station	121,823 sq ft (11,317.7 m^{2})	July 12, 1995; 31 years ago	Closed in 2020 due to the COVID-19 pandemic and demolished in 2022.
Graton Resort & Casino	340,000 sq ft (32,000 m^{2})	November 5, 2013; 12 years ago	Operated through a seven-year deal (2013-2020) with the Federated Indians of Graton Rancheria, which owns the resort.
Fiesta Henderson	73,450 sq ft (6,824 m^{2})	February 10, 1998; 28 years ago	Originally opened as The Reserve, and purchased in 2001 by Station, which renamed it that year as Fiesta Henderson. Closed in 2020 due to the COVID-19 pandemic and demolished in 2022.
Fiesta Rancho	59,932 sq ft (5,567.9 m^{2})	December 14, 1994; 31 years ago	Originally opened by the Maloof family as the Fiesta. In 2001, it was purchased by Station and renamed Fiesta Rancho. Closed in 2020 due to the COVID-19 pandemic and demolished in 2022.
Palms Casino Resort	94,840 sq ft (8,811 m^{2})	November 15, 2001; 24 years ago	Originally opened by the Maloof family, with Station holding a six-percent ownership stake. Station later bought the resort in 2016, before selling to the San Manuel Band of Mission Indians in 2021.
Wild Wild West Gambling Hall & Hotel	11,250 sq ft (1,045 m^{2})	July 13, 1998; 28 years ago	Originally opened in 1974, as the King 8. In 1998, it was purchased by Station and renamed the Wild Wild West. It closed in 2022 for future redevelopment.
Aliante Station	125,000 sq ft (11,600 m^{2})	November 11, 2008; 17 years ago	Sold to a holding company in 2011, following Station's bankruptcy two years earlier. Station continued operating the resort until 2012, when it was renamed Aliante Casino and Hotel.
Castaways	35,000 sq ft (3,300 m^{2})	September 3, 1954; 72 years ago	Closed in 2004 and purchased later that year by Station, which subsequently demolished it. A Wildfire casino now occupies a portion of the site.
Station Casino Kansas City	140,000 sq ft (13,000 m^{2})	January 16, 1997; 29 years ago	In 2000, it was sold to Ameristar Casinos and renamed Ameristar Casino Kansas City.
Station Casino St. Charles	130,000 sq ft (12,000 m^{2})	May 27, 1994; 32 years ago	Sold and renamed in 2000, following a purchase by Ameristar Casinos.
Thunder Valley	144,500 sq ft (13,420 m^{2})	June 9, 2003; 23 years ago	Owned by the United Auburn Indian Community, and operated by Station from 2003 to 2010.

== Development sites ==
Various sites around the Las Vegas Valley are owned by Station for future development.

- Losee Station
- Flamingo Road – At Clark County 215 and Town Center Drive in Summerlin South.
- Wild Wild West – At the intersection of Dean Martin Drive and West Tropicana Avenue in Paradise. Due to the special proximity of this site to the Las Vegas Strip, Station intends to build a tourist-oriented megaresort on this site.
- 40 acres at Tule Springs
- 45 acres at Inspirada
- A site at Skye Canyon
- 126 acres at Cactus Avenue and Las Vegas Boulevard
