= Graton Resort & Casino =

Indian casino and hotel in California

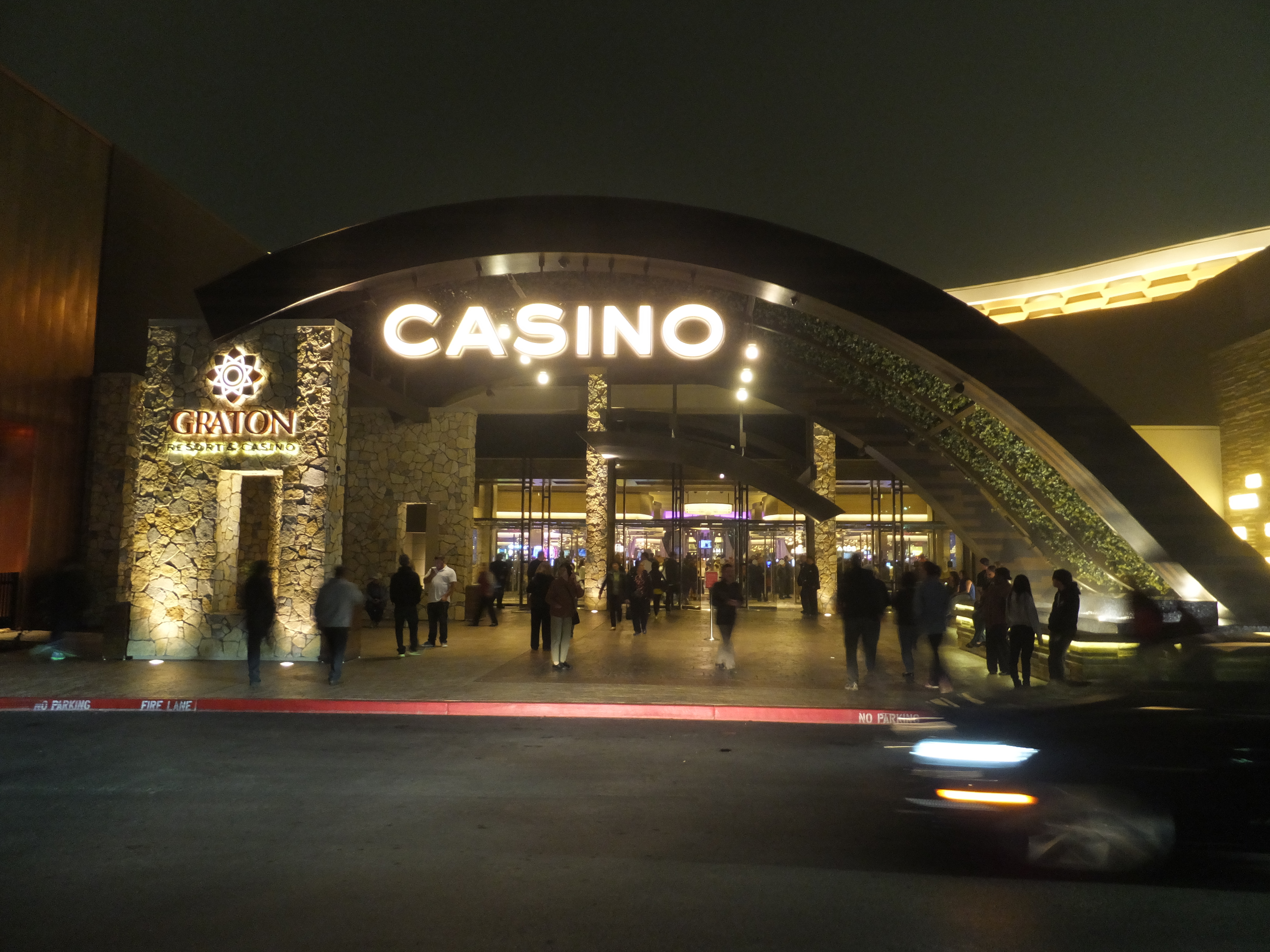
- Interactive map of Graton Resort & Casino
- Location: Rohnert Park, California; 288 Golf Course Dr West; 38.36076°N 122.72317°W
- Opened: November 5, 2013
- No. of rooms: 200
- Gaming space: 135,000 sq ft (12,500 m^{2})
- Notable restaurants: M.Y. China
- Casino type: Indian
- Owner: Federated Indians of Graton Rancheria
- Website: gratonresortcasino.com

Graton Resort & Casino is an Indian casino and hotel outside Rohnert Park, California, that opened on November 5, 2013. It is owned and operated by the Federated Indians of Graton Rancheria. The casino has 3,000 slot machines, 144 table games, and a poker room. In November 2016 it opened an adjacent hotel with 200 rooms.

== History ==
The tribe announced plans in February 2003 for a casino to be built at a 1,700-acre site on Sears Point, near the shore of San Pablo Bay. The plan sparked widespread criticism about the potential effects on wetland restoration efforts and increased traffic on Highway 37, leading the tribe to consider other locations in Rohnert Park and Petaluma. A new site on 360 acres of land west of Rohnert Park, on Stony Point Road, was announced in August 2003, with strong support from city officials.

The tribe announced in August 2005 that the planned site would move again, this time to a 90-acre site on Wilfred Avenue, closer to the city limits. The new site was said to be less environmentally sensitive, and more compliant with the county's land use plan, which had designated the Stony Point Road site for open space. Station Casinos bought the Wilfred Avenue tract for the tribe for $76 million, and also bought 180 acres of the Stony Point land for $24 million, to use for environmental mitigation projects.

The Bureau of Indian Affairs approved the tribe's application to take the land into trust, a key step towards approval of a casino, in May 2008. The action was delayed, however, when a local group opposing the project, Stop the Casino 101, filed a lawsuit contesting the decision. The land was not taken into trust until October 2010, after the lawsuit failed.

A tribal-state compact was reached in March 2012 after negotiations with Governor Jerry Brown, and was soon ratified by the California State Legislature. Construction work began the following June. The tribe secured $825 million to fund the project, the greatest amount ever financed for an Indian casino.

The casino opened on November 5, 2013.

In January 2015, the tribe secured $450 million in financing for the resort, including up to $200 million to build a hotel. Hotel construction began in September 2015, and the six-story, 200-room hotel opened in November 2016. Plans for a new hotel wing with an additional 200 rooms were announced in April 2017.

In May 2015, the U.S. Supreme Court declined to hear an appeal in Stop the Casino 101 v. Brown, in which anti-casino activists claimed that the tribe's trust land was not properly removed from state jurisdiction. The rejection by the Supreme Court ended the lawsuit.

In December 2020, amid the COVID-19 pandemic in California, the casino faced criticism for having announced plans to hold a private New Year's Eve event that was expected to have 4,000 attendees (thus making it a probable superspreading event). Although state health orders do not apply to tribal land, the casino voluntarily canceled the event after concerns were raised by Sonoma County health officials, and announced that it will close on the evening of New Year's Eve.

== Operations ==
The casino was managed by Station Casinos, a Las Vegas firm, which had a seven-year agreement with the tribe to manage the casino. The tribe paid $20.4 million in management fees in the first nine months of operations. As of February 2021, the agreement with Station Casinos was not renewed and Graton is independently managed by the tribe. The casino has 3,000 slot machines and 144 blackjack, poker and baccarat tables. It is open 24 hours per day, every day of the year.

The tribe makes payments to offset the impacts of the casino. As of 2014, the tribe was paying about $8 million annually to the city of Rohnert Park, and $5 million to Sonoma County.
