= Aliante Casino and Hotel =

Resort in North Las Vegas

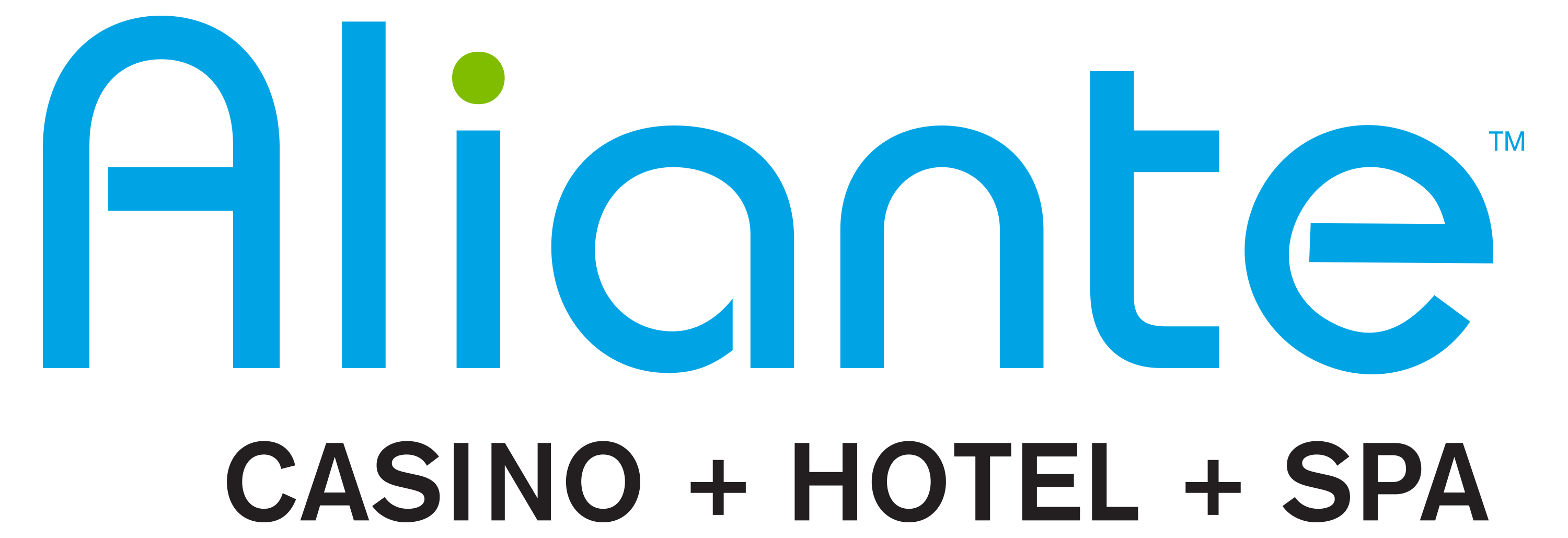

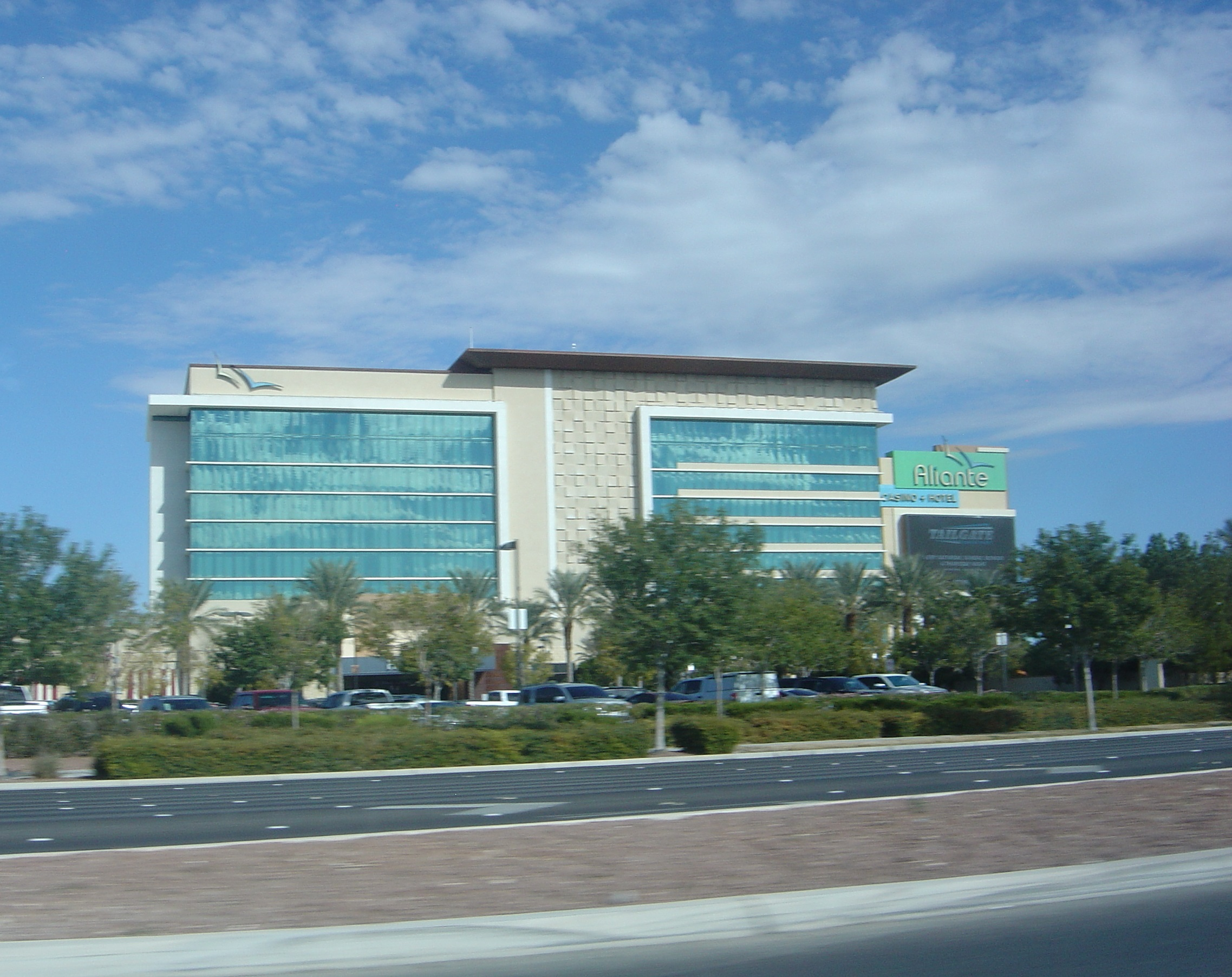
- The Aliante casino hotel in October 2018
- Interactive map of Aliante Casino and Hotel
- Location: North Las Vegas, Nevada, U.S.; 7300 North Aliante Parkway; 36°17′28″N 115°10′55″W
- Opened: November 11, 2008; 17 years ago
- Theme: Desert
- No. of rooms: 211
- Gaming space: 125,000 sq ft (11,600 m^{2})
- Signature attractions: Regal Cinemas
- Notable restaurants: Bistro 57; FARM (formerly Grand Café); Medley Buffet (2008–2020: formerly Feast Buffet); MRKT Sea & Land; The Salted Lime
- Casino type: Land-based
- Owner: Boyd Gaming
- Previous names: Aliante Station (2008–2012)
- Renovated in: 2012–2013
- Website: aliantegaming.com

Aliante Casino and Hotel (formerly Aliante Station) is a casino hotel in the Aliante community in North Las Vegas, Nevada. It is owned and operated by Boyd Gaming. The resort was announced as the Aliante Station in December 2005, as a joint project between Station Casinos and The Greenspun Corporation, with an initial cost of $400 million to $450 million. Construction began in February 2007, and the resort was built at a cost of $662 million.

After opening in November 2008, the resort operated at a financial loss. Station Casinos filed for bankruptcy the following year, and the resort's ownership was transferred to a holding company. Profits subsequently improved, and Station Casinos continued managing the property until November 2012, when it was renamed Aliante Casino and Hotel. Parts of the resort were then rebranded and refurbished, at a cost of $2.8 million. Boyd Gaming purchased the hotel-casino in 2016, at a cost of $380 million.

== History ==
Aliante Station logo (2008–2012)

Mike Montandon, mayor of North Las Vegas, Nevada, was initially against the inclusion of a casino in the planned community of Aliante during its early planning stages in 2002, although he was ultimately convinced by the community's developers that it would be a good idea. In October 2002, 40 acres (16 ha) of property at the northeast corner of the Las Vegas Beltway and Aliante Parkway were set as the future site of a hotel-casino in the community. The land was owned by The Greenspun Corporation through its American Nevada Company, which was co-developing the Aliante community.

Aliante Station was announced on December 20, 2005, as a joint project between Station Casinos and The Greenspun Corporation, which had previously partnered in developing the Green Valley Ranch hotel-casino. Under the deal, Station Casinos would build and manage the resort, which would include approximately 200 hotel rooms and 2,000 slot machines. Construction would cost between $400 million and $450 million, with joint financing from both companies. Construction was expected to begin in late 2006 or early 2007, with an opening in mid-2008.

In September 2006, Station Casinos announced that the project's budget had increased to $600 million as the result of rising construction costs, in addition to redesigned plans for a larger resort. Rising construction costs accounted for approximately $30 million of the increased budget. Groundbreaking took place on February 22, 2007. The property had received 1,000 employee applications each week from mid-July through early October 2008. Prior to its opening, Station Casinos expected some economic difficulty for Aliante Station due to the Great Recession. Station Casinos' target clientele was a combination of the company's current customer base, the 6,500 households in the Aliante community, tourists, and visitors to the nearby Las Vegas Motor Speedway. The project was completed at a cost of $662 million.

=== Opening ===
Following a fireworks show, the Aliante Station opened early, at 10:40 p.m. on November 11, 2008, due to large crowds gathered outside. The resort had been scheduled to open at 11:11 p.m., a time which was considered lucky. It was the first new hotel-casino to open in North Las Vegas since the Cannery Casino and Hotel in 2003. A pre-opening party was held for nearly 3,000 invited guests, and included an hour-long concert performance by Sheryl Crow. Guests included George Maloof, Terrence Lanni, and other gaming company officials.

Aliante Station included the largest casino in North Las Vegas at the time, measuring 80,000 sq ft (7,400 m^{2}), with 2,554 slot machines and 40 table games. The casino also included a 170-seat sportsbook, with large television monitors spanning a total of 96 feet. Approximately 1,500 of the slot machines were penny games, and the resort also offered inexpensive restaurant options to appeal to Station Casinos' customer base while attracting new customers during the weak economy. The resort was located within a three-mile radius of more than 100,000 residents. The resort featured a food court as well as six restaurants, including Station Casinos' Feast Buffet. Also included was Camacho's Cantina, a Mexican restaurant with more than 100 different types of tequila, as well as a chandelier made out of 2,700 empty tequila bottles.

Aliante Station featured a desert theme. Its design was inspired by Scottsdale, Arizona, and company officials described it as "contemporary Scottsdale with a combination of muted and vibrant colors." A modern design was chosen after positive customer reactions to Station Casinos' Red Rock Resort, which opened in April 2006 with a modern design. The resort included Earth tones and crystal adornments, similar to the larger Red Rock Resort. Aliante Station included approximately 1,400 employees at its opening, including 350 who transferred from Station Casinos' other resorts. The resort had 5,000 parking spaces, including a 3,300-space parking garage. The resort also had 14,000 sq ft (1,300 m^{2}) of convention space with capacity for up to 1,000 people, in addition to an arcade and a 700-person pool.

The resort's 16-screen all-digital movie theater, operated by Regal Cinemas and measuring 81,000 sq ft (7,500 m^{2}), held its grand opening on November 14, 2008, after two days of bargain previews. The resort's 3,500 sq ft (330 m^{2}) Access Showroom, designed by Scéno Plus, also opened on November 14, with a performance by Smokey Robinson. The showroom included seating for 600 people, and could be arranged into a 340-seat lounge. The hotel also opened on November 14, with 202 rooms and 9 suites, while a planned future phase would add a second hotel tower for an additional 202 rooms. Similar to the Green Valley Ranch arrangement with The Greenspun Corporation, Station Casinos received a management fee of two percent of revenues for Aliante Station, and five percent of its cash flow.

=== Operation and sale ===
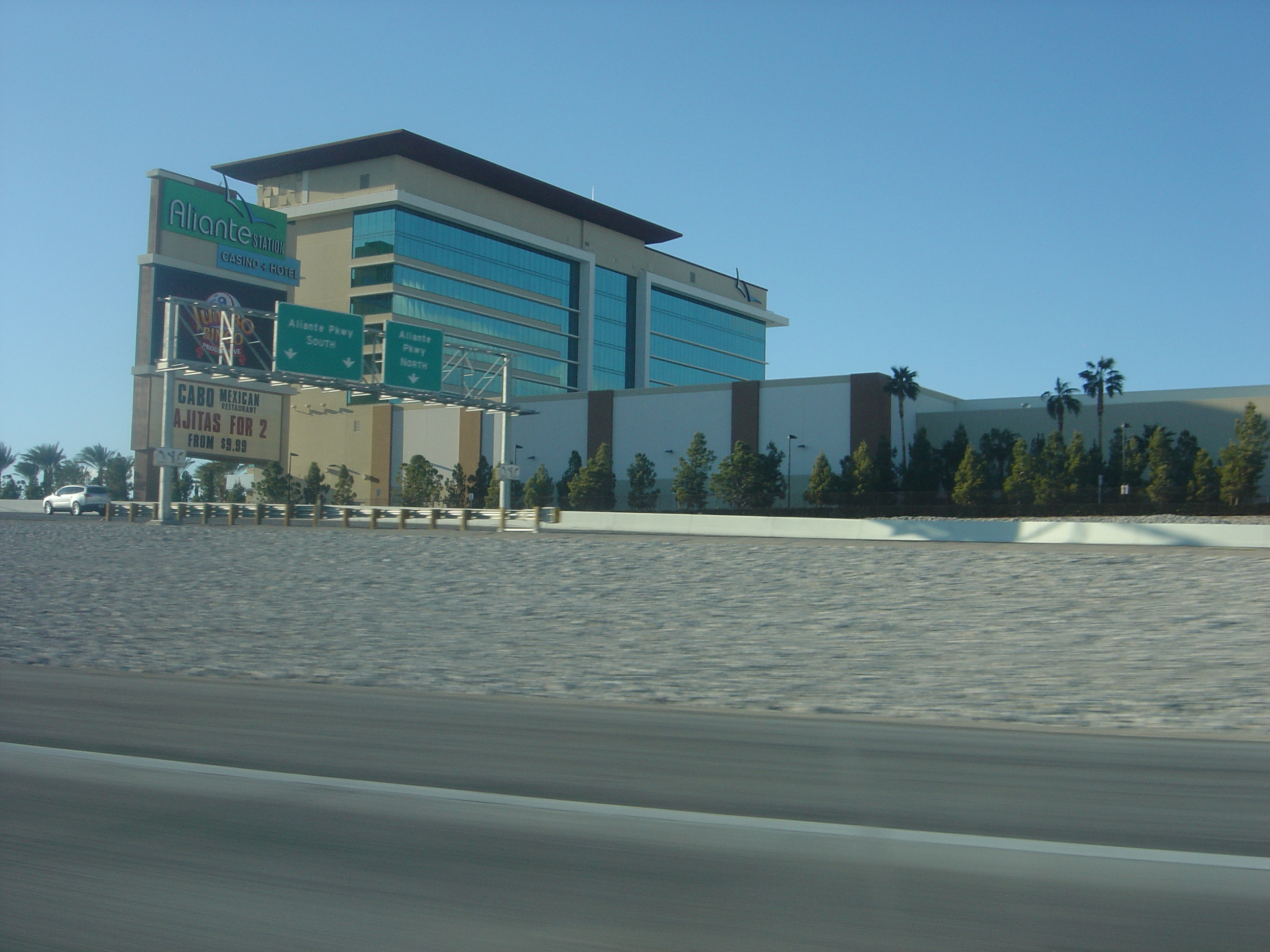
Aliante Station in 2012

After its opening, Aliante Station operated at a financial loss due to below-average operating margins, and its employee count later decreased to 880. After Station Casinos filed for bankruptcy in July 2009, Aliante was handed over in November 2011 to its creditors, a group of nine banks and three private equity firms that were owed more than $378 million, while the property's estimated liquidation value was only $47–53 million. ALST Casino Holdco LLC, a holding company, was created to own the resort, with its largest shareholders being Apollo Global Management (20%), Standard General (28%) and TPG Capital (20%).

After the ownership change in November 2011, profits improved over the next year. Station Casinos continued to manage Aliante Station under an agreement with the new owners until November 1, 2012, when the resort was renamed Aliante Casino and Hotel. The Aliante was then managed by Aliante Gaming, and a 24-hour restaurant, The Farm 24/7, was added that month. A total of $2.8 million was spent on rebranding and refurbishing parts of the resort; a second-floor spa area was among the improvements. Following the end of Station Casinos' involvement in the property, three restaurants were rebranded and reopened in January 2013: The Salted Lime, Bistro 57, and the Medley Buffet. In the year after the management change, 200 additional employees were hired, for a total of 860. The casino's 1,800 slot machines were also updated, and a bingo room was added as well. Hotel renovations also took place. By February 2014, hotel occupancy had increased to an average of 90 percent, in comparison to 40 percent in late 2012.

In April 2016, Boyd Gaming announced a deal to purchase ALST Casino Holdco LLC and become the resort's new owner. Boyd Gaming's $380 million purchase was completed in September 2016. As of 2017, the casino is 125,000 sq ft (11,600 m^{2}).
