= Frank Fertitta III =

American entrepreneur

- Born: Frank Joseph Fertitta III; February 24, 1962 (age 64); Las Vegas, Nevada, U.S.
- Education: University of Southern California (BASc)
- Occupation: Businessman
- Spouse: Jill Fertitta
- Children: 3
- Father: Frank Fertitta Jr.
- Relatives: Lorenzo Fertitta (brother); Tilman Fertitta (cousin)
- Website: Official website

Frank Joseph Fertitta III (February 24, 1962) is an American businessman. He is the CEO of Station Casinos. He is also a founder of Zuffa LLC, formerly the parent entity of the Ultimate Fighting Championship (UFC).

== Education ==
Born to Frank Fertitta Jr. and Victoria (née Broussard) Fertitta, Frank III attended Bishop Gorman High School in Las Vegas, Nevada. In 1984, he graduated from the University of Southern California, where he earned a BA/BS degree from the business school.

== Career ==
History with Station Casinos:

- 1985: Officer/General Manager
- 1986: Director, Executive Vice President and Chief Operating Officer
- 1989 – July 2000: President
- July 1992 – present: Chief Executive Officer

Fertitta as owner of the Palms Casino nightclub KAOS lost an $8 million lawsuit in 2022 brought by DJ Kaskade for nonpayment of his two-year performance contract.

== Philanthropy ==
On October 18, 2012, the University of Southern California announced that Jill and Frank Fertitta had made a major gift to the university which would result in the construction of a new building for the USC Marshall School of Business and the establishment of the Jill and Frank Fertitta Endowed Chair in Business.

== Political activity ==
Fertitta is third-cousin to fellow businessman Tilman Fertitta. Frank and his wife are major donors to the Republican Party and Republican candidates, having given more than $9,800,000 from 2009 to 2020, making him, along with his brother, one of the largest contributors in Nevada.

Together with his spouse, Fertitta contributed $721,200 to Donald Trump's 2020 presidential campaign.

== Personal life ==
Fertitta resides in Las Vegas with his wife Jill and three children.

Fertitta as owner of the Palms Casino nightclub KAOS lost an $8 million lawsuit in 2022 brought by DJ Kaskade for nonpayment of his two-year performance contract.

Fertitta is among plaintiffs against Knoedler Gallery LLC for having sold to him a forged Mark Rothko painting.
