= Mike Montandon =

American politician

Mayor of North Las Vegas
- In office 1997–2009
- Succeeded by: Shari Buck

Personal details
- Born: July 15, 1963 (age 63)
- Party: Republican
- Education: Arizona State University
- Occupation: Former Mayor of North Las Vegas
- Website: Montandon for Governor

Michael L. Montandon (born July 15, 1963) is an American politician. He is the former mayor of North Las Vegas, Nevada and a Republican gubernatorial candidate in the Nevada gubernatorial election, 2010.

== Personal life ==
Montandon is a graduate of Arizona State University. He also completed the Harvard University Program for Senior Executives at the John F. Kennedy School of Government.

== 2010 gubernatorial election ==
Montandon, current Governor Jim Gibbons, and former federal judge Brian Sandoval have all announced their intentions to run. Montandon announced his candidacy in the summer of 2009.

=== Issues ===
Montandon is running on conservative credentials in the primary, on a platform including the following points:

- A "guarantee that 65% of every education dollar goes into our classrooms."
- Supporting "pro-life" values.
- Verification that "every person has the right to a secret ballot in any election that our government oversees."
- Opening Yucca Mountain because "it will bring new, high paying jobs to Nevada."
- Support of "a low tax environment [that] will bring businesses into the state and provide better jobs for all Nevadans."

Montandon supports the following:

- Second amendment rights: "Our ignorance is assumed, even counted on, in the war against our freedoms. Even a cursory examination of the history of the first ten amendments to our Constitution, the Bill of Rights, would give us an indisputable argument against the forces that assail our liberties."
- The use of a minimum of 65 percent of primary-school education spending in the classroom: "It is clear to me that the first step is to establish a benchmark of ensuring that sixty five cents out of every dollar that Nevada spends on elementary education goes directly into the classroom. This will immediately establish the primacy of educating over bureaucracy."
- Economic growth through stable government policy: "Every politician talks about bringing high paying jobs to Nevada. These jobs don't come to Nevada unless Nevada sets its economic table properly."

=== On his opponents ===
Montandon called opponent Brian Sandoval a quitter as Sandoval jumped into the race in September 2009:

"Brian Sandoval quit mid-term in the Nevada Assembly. Brian Sandoval quit in the middle of his term as attorney general, virtually handing the office to a liberal Democrat in the next election. And now, Brian Sandoval says he will quit his job as a federal judge and give (President) Barack Obama the opportunity to appoint another liberal judge to the federal bench. Since when is quitting a qualification for governor?"

== See also ==
- List of mayors of North Las Vegas, Nevada
