= Frank Fertitta Jr. =

American businessman (1938–2009)

- Born: Frank Joseph Fertitta Jr. October 30, 1938; Beaumont, Texas, U.S.
- Died: August 21, 2009 (aged 70); Los Angeles, California, U.S.
- Resting place: Palm Desert Memorial, Las Vegas, Nevada, U.S.
- Occupation: Entrepreneur
- Spouse: Victoria Broussard (m. 1958)
- Children: 3, including Frank III and Lorenzo

Frank Joseph Fertitta Jr. (October 30, 1938 – August 21, 2009) was an American entrepreneur. He was the founder of Station Casinos, a gaming company based in Summerlin South, Nevada. The company started out as a locals casino operator on July 1, 1976, opening the Bingo Palace, which was later renamed Palace Station.

== Background ==
Fertitta was born on October 30, 1938, in Beaumont, Texas, to Frank Joseph Fertitta and Josephine Grilliette. He graduated from Galveston's Kirwin High School in 1956 and married Victoria Broussard in 1958. Fertitta arrived in Las Vegas, Nevada, from Texas with his wife Victoria in 1960. Frank began his career in gaming as a bellman at the Tropicana while learning to become a dealer.

Over the next 16 years until 1976, he worked as a dealer, pit boss, baccarat manager and general manager at properties including the Stardust; Tropicana, Circus Circus, Sahara and the Fremont in downtown Las Vegas.

Fertitta felt there was a gap in the market for casinos that locals could visit and where casino workers could come after work and as a result, opened his first local casino, named "The Casino" in 1976. This 5,000-square-foot (460 m^{2}) square gambling hall was attached to the Mini-Price Motor Inn and was a short drive from Las Vegas Boulevard. "It was pretty much desert," son Lorenzo Fertitta told the Las Vegas Sun in 2005. "People thought he was crazy." However, today Station Casinos is one of the biggest local casino operators in Las Vegas.

Fertitta Jr. died on August 21, 2009, of complications from heart surgery at the Cedars-Sinai Medical Center in Beverly Grove, Los Angeles, California, at the age of 70. He was interred at the Palm Desert Memorial in Las Vegas, Nevada.
