= Eureka (hotel and casino) =

Casino hotel in Nevada, United States

Eureka Casino Resort
- Interactive map of Eureka Casino Resort
- Location: Mesquite, Nevada; 275 Mesa Boulevard; 36.817637°N 114.063413°W
- Opened: August 1996 (hotel); February 14, 1997 (casino)
- Theme: Southwestern
- No. of rooms: 214
- Gaming space: 40,285 sq ft (3,742.6 m^{2})
- Casino type: Land-based
- Owner: Employee Stock Ownership Plan (ESOP)
- Operating license holder: Rancho Mesquite Casino Company
- Previous names: Rancho Mesquite (until 2000)
- Renovated in: 2005–07
- Website: www.eurekamesquite.com

Eureka Casino Resort is a hotel and casino in Mesquite, Nevada. It initially operated under the name Rancho Mesquite. The hotel portion, originally part of the Holiday Inn chain, opened in August 1996. The casino opened on February 14, 1997. The Rancho Mesquite was owned by the Lee family, who were the only Nevada casino owners to be of Asian descent. Because of confusion with other businesses, the name was changed to Eureka in 2000.

In 2016, the Eureka was sold to its 550 employees through an Employee Stock Ownership Plan (ESOP), becoming one of two casinos in the United States to be employee-owned.

== History ==
Real estate developer Ted Lee had considered making a land investment in Laughlin, Nevada during the 1980s, but ultimately passed on the idea. He was later surprised to learn of Laughlin's rapid growth within a few years, and decided to figure out which city in Nevada could be next for such growth. Mesquite was considered one possibility, and a month later, an investment group from that city contacted Lee about a possible investment on property located at the intersection of Pioneer Boulevard and Mesa Boulevard. The group wanted to build a hotel and casino on the land, but eventually abandoned the project and sold the property around 1989 to Lee, who proceeded with the idea. However, he was skeptical that Mesquite, with its small population, could sustain another casino property. At the time, the only casino in Mesquite was the Oasis.

Lee initially intended to name his hotel-casino "Conastoga". He put his project on hold when construction began across the street on a rival hotel-casino called the Virgin River, which opened in 1990. Planning for Lee's project, now called Rancho Mesquite, was underway again in early 1995. Groundbreaking took place on August 22, 1995. Lee still had some concerns about whether the city could sustain more gambling, as three new casinos – the others being Players Island and the Mesquite Star – would be opening in Mesquite within a year of each other. Construction was halted by the city at one point because the general contractor on the project had failed to comply with building codes.

The hotel was affiliated with the Holiday Inn brand and opened in August 1996, with 215 rooms, located in a four-story building. The Rancho Mesquite casino opened on February 14, 1997, in a separate building located on the same property. It was Mesquite's fourth casino, and was operated by Longhorn Group, which also owned two casinos in Las Vegas. The 45,000 sq ft (4,200 m^{2}) casino building included 500 slot machines and 13 table games. It also featured a restaurant, bar, and lounge with live entertainment. When it opened, the Lee family were the only casino owners in Nevada to be of Asian descent.

At the time of its opening, many gaming observers considered the Mesquite casino market to be overbuilt, although rival casinos believed that the opening of the Rancho Mesquite would be beneficial for all casinos in the city by increasing overall business. The Rancho Mesquite featured a southwestern theme, and its target clientele consisted of residents from southern Nevada and southern Utah. According to Lee, observers were critical of the Rancho Mesquite's layout, although he believed that having two different buildings, separated by a parking lot, would provide better access for local patrons of the casino.

The Rancho Mesquite struggled initially. Greg Lee, the son of Ted Lee, lived at the hotel and served as president of the Rancho Mesquite. Greg Lee became familiar with regular customers and their opinions of the property, and he used this knowledge to improve the Rancho Mesquite by adding a steakhouse and newer slot machines. The property also signed a deal to become the host hotel for golf packages at the Wolf Creek Golf Club in Mesquite.

In November 1997, an episode of Promised Land was filmed at the casino.

=== Eureka ===
In November 1999, the Lee family was planning to rename the Rancho Mesquite as the Eureka, to avoid confusion with other businesses such as the Mesquite Star. A contest was also launched for customers to submit their own name ideas with the chance of being selected instead of "Eureka". Nearly 1,500 names were submitted by more than 700 participants. On December 31, 1999, the Lee family announced that Eureka would be the new name. The Lees already operated a small Eureka casino in the Las Vegas Valley. Greg Lee said, "We've always liked the name, 'Eureka'. It is synonymous with discovery, excitement, and finding something valuable. The slogan, 'Eureka, I've Found It,' has been a part of western lore since the Gold Rush in 1849. Furthermore, the name is short, active and usable on billboards".

Lee said that the old name seemed "very generic," stating, "Over the years, there have been five other casinos (in Mesquite), and a lot of residential development. Our name seemed like it was no longer connoting a casino, and could be confused with other developments. We wanted to give it a name denoting fortune, gaming and what a casino is." Lee also said that because of population growth, there "are a lot more businesses with the name 'Rancho' and 'Mesquite', and this was confusing our customers." At the time of the name change, the Lees had ended the property's affiliation with Holiday Inn. The name change was expected to become effective in March 2000.

As of 2003, the Eureka had 350 employees. That year, the Eureka surpassed the Virgin River to become the most successful casino in Mesquite, which was seeing a continual rise in its population. A $30 million renovation began in 2005, and concluded two years later. The project expanded the casino and added a buffet, while another $3 million was spent renovating the hotel. The casino expansion included 300 new slot machines and a new sportsbook and poker room. As of 2009, Greg Lee remained as the only Asian casino owner in Nevada. At the time, further expansion plans were on hold due to the economic effects of the Great Recession.

In 2010, the Eureka began hosting a popular and annual Fourth of July celebration known as "Rockets over the Red Mesa".

In February 2013, the Eureka hosted an off-road vehicle event on vacant land adjacent to the resort. The event was attended by 7,000 people, and included Nitro Circus rider Tanner Godfrey breaking a Guinness World Record for longest jump on an ATV. Later that year, the resort allowed the installation of a radio transmitter on its roof to expand coverage for KNPR.

After two years of consideration, the Lee family announced in October 2015 that they would sell their interest in the Eureka to its 550 workers through an Employee Stock Ownership Plan (ESOP). Greg Lee said that the gaming industry had been stagnant since 2007, and that an ESOP would allow the Eureka to strategize future growth. The sale would also allow employees to earn certain retirement benefits via the resort's profits. The Lee family had always considered the employees to be part of their own family, with Greg Lee stating, "Many of them have been with us since my father and mother first opened the Eureka in 1997. The ESOP makes the Eureka even more of a 'family business' and honors the employees' contributions to our success."

The sale was approved by the Nevada Gaming Control Board and the Nevada Gaming Commission in November 2015. Two months later, the Mesquite City Council unanimously approved the transfer of gaming and liquor licenses to the ESOP. The Eureka is one of two casinos in the United States to be owned through an ESOP, the other being the Casino Queen in East St. Louis, Illinois. Lee remained as the chief executive officer of the Eureka, while Andre Carrier remained as chief operating officer and also serves as trustee of the ESOP. As of 2017, the casino is managed by Rancho Mesquite Casino Company.

Doris Lee, one of the founders of the property, died of lymphoma in 2018, at the age of 98.

In 2018 and 2019, the Eureka was included on Fortune's Top 100 Medium Workplaces, a list consisting of U.S. businesses with less than 1,000 workers. Eureka employees told Fortune, "We are one huge family and deeply care for one another."

A $40 million renovation of the casino floor and hotel rooms began in 2024. The property also plans to eventually build retail and residential space on 35 acres (14 ha), located behind the casino building.

== Features ==
The Eureka has 214 hotel rooms and a 40,285 sq ft (3,742.6 m^{2}) casino, which includes 1,000 slot machines. It also has three restaurants: Gregory's Mesquite Grill, Mason Street Courtyard, and Town Square Buffet. The Eureka also includes the Grand Canyon Ballroom, used for hosting various events. When the Mesquite Local News ran its Best of Mesquite reader poll in 2013, the Eureka won more accolades than any other business, for 13 categories that included best casino, hotel, and restaurants.

== Other locations ==
The Lees own and operate another Eureka casino in the Las Vegas Valley, at 595 East Sahara Avenue. It originally opened as Friendly Fergie's Casino in 1964, and was purchased by the Lee family in 1988. They rebranded it as the Eureka in the mid-1990s. It is located east of the Las Vegas Strip and is small in comparison to most gaming properties in the area.

Eureka expanded to Seabrook, New Hampshire, in 2019 by purchasing the former Seabrook Greyhound Park. The property, now called The Brook, underwent a yearlong, multi-million dollar renovation and features a casino, poker room, racebook and DraftKings sportsbook.
