= List of casino hotels =

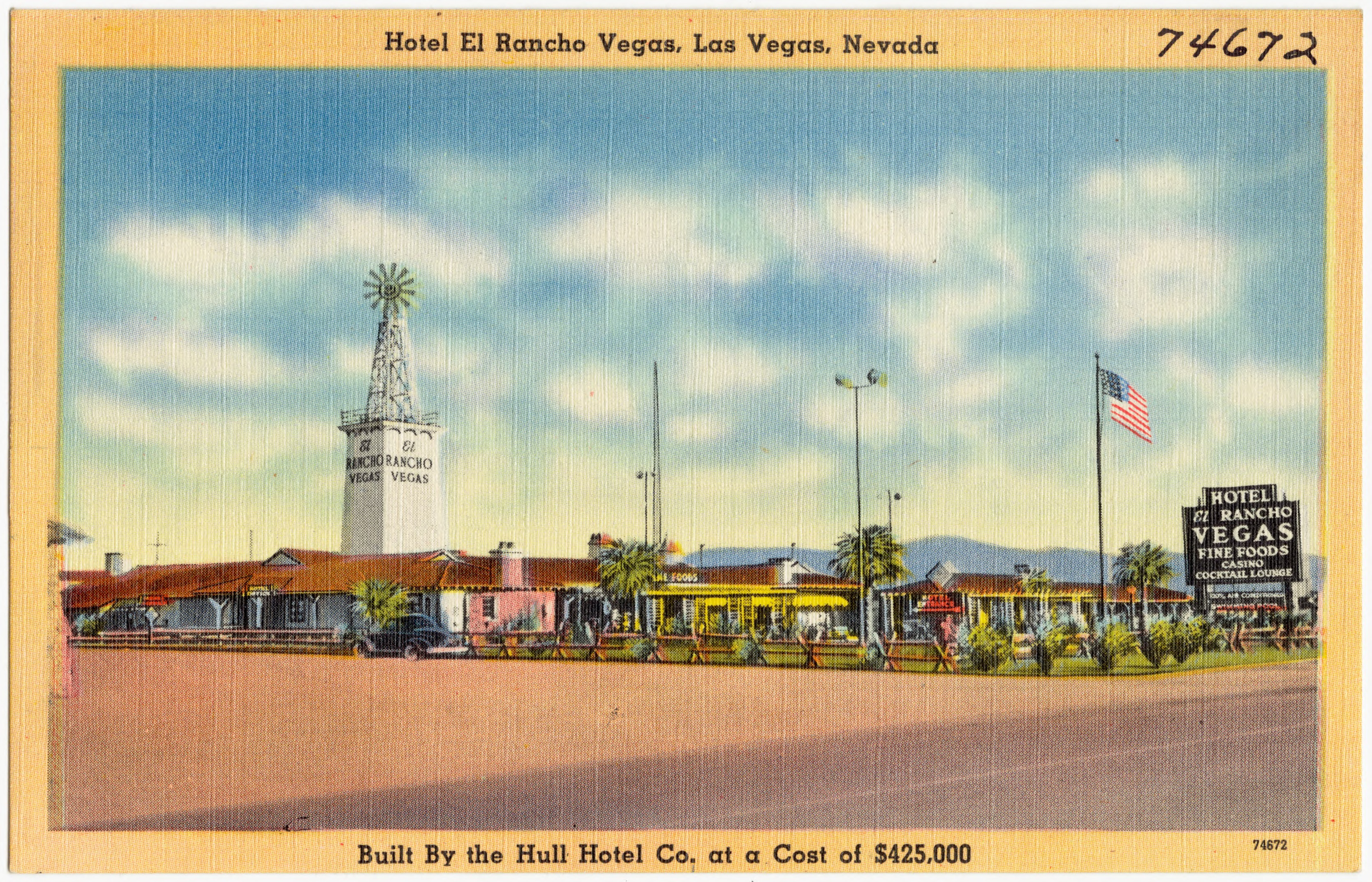
A 1940s postcard of El Rancho Vegas, the first casino hotel to be built on the Las Vegas Strip.

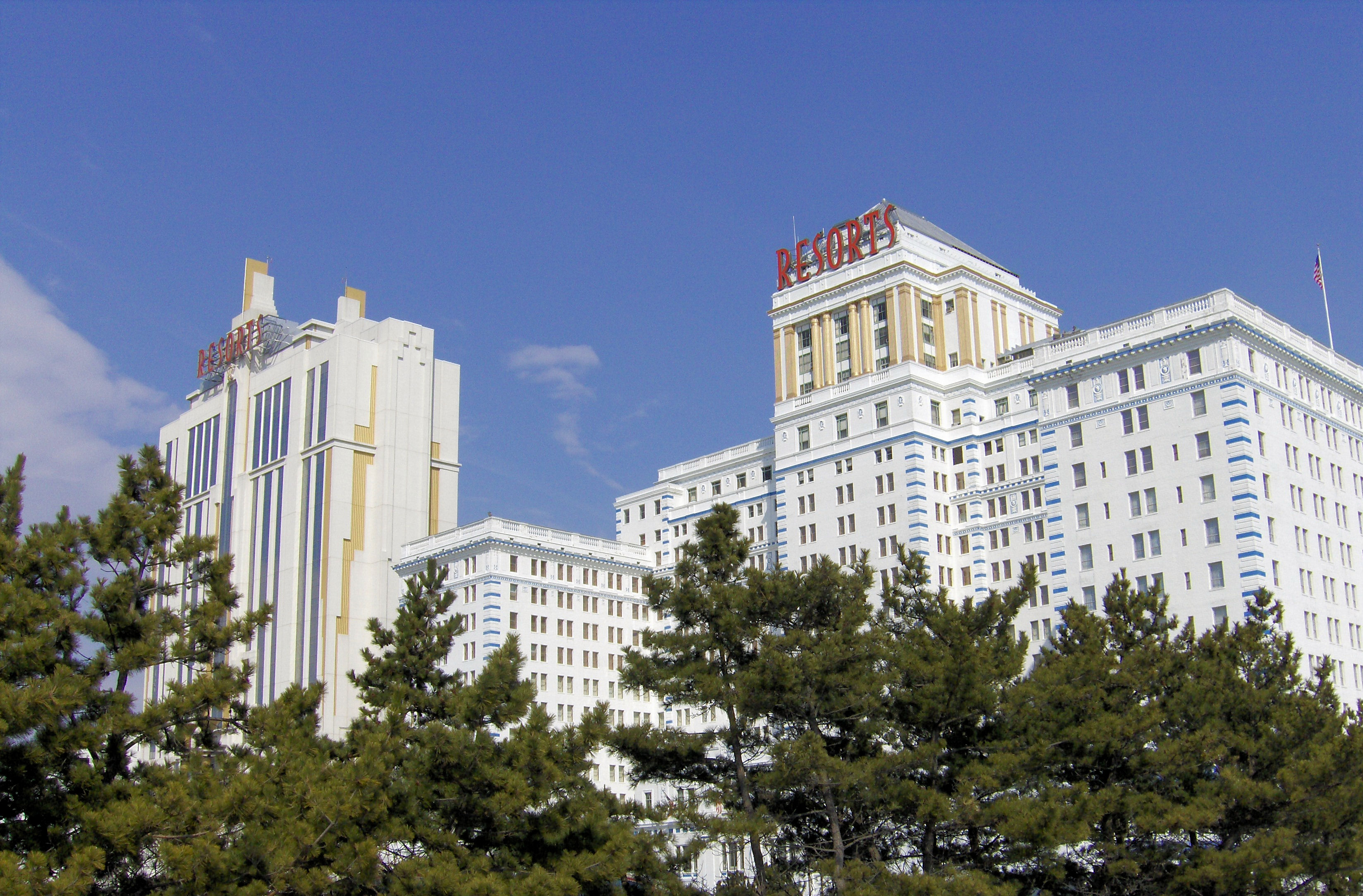
Resorts Casino Hotel in Atlantic City, New Jersey, the first casino hotel to operate legally outside of Nevada.

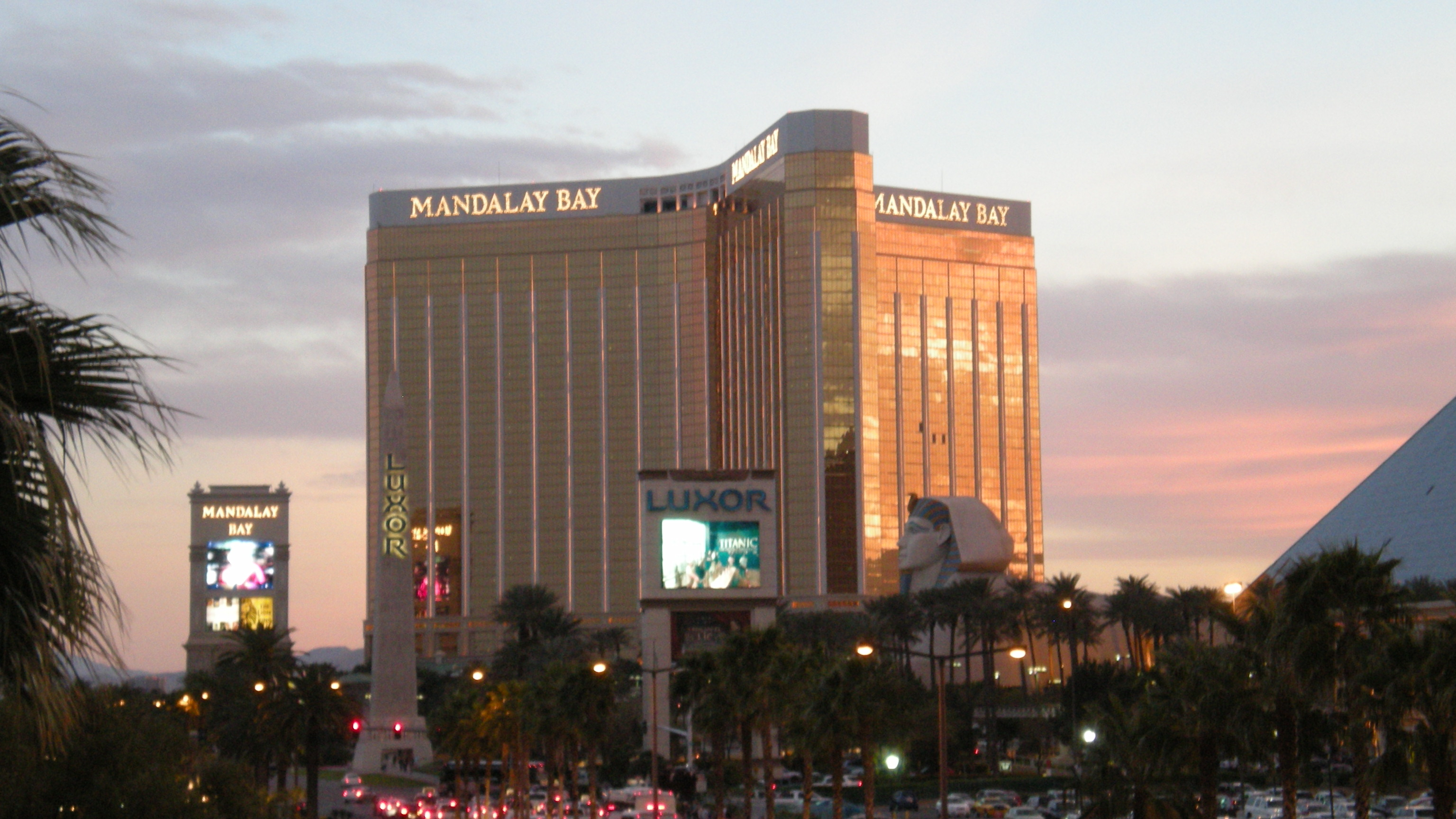
Mandalay Bay is located on the Las Vegas Strip.

This is a list of notable casino hotels. A casino hotel is an establishment consisting of a casino with temporary lodging provided in an on-premises hotel.

== Casino hotels ==
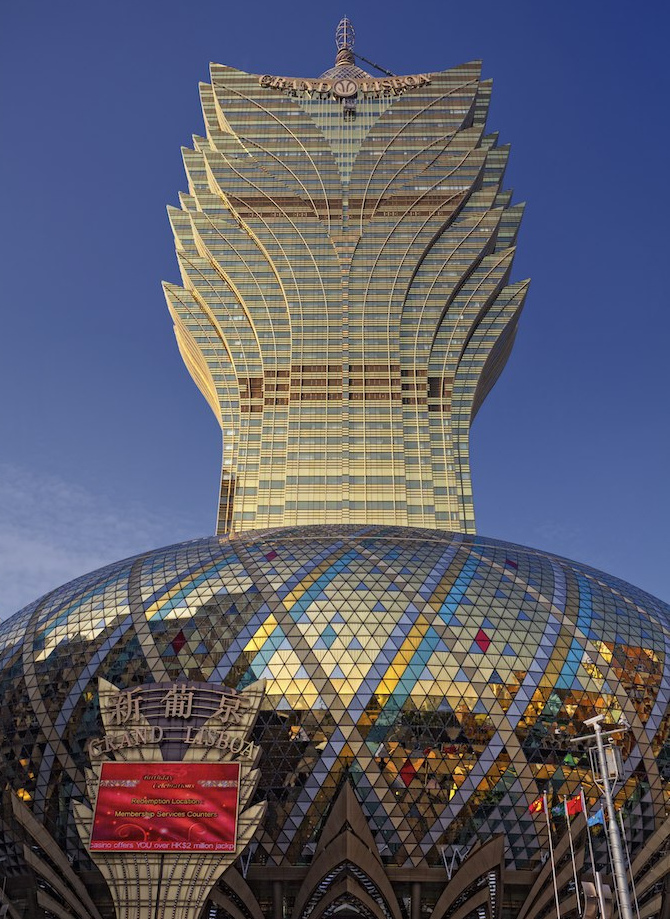
Grand Lisboa is located in Macau, China

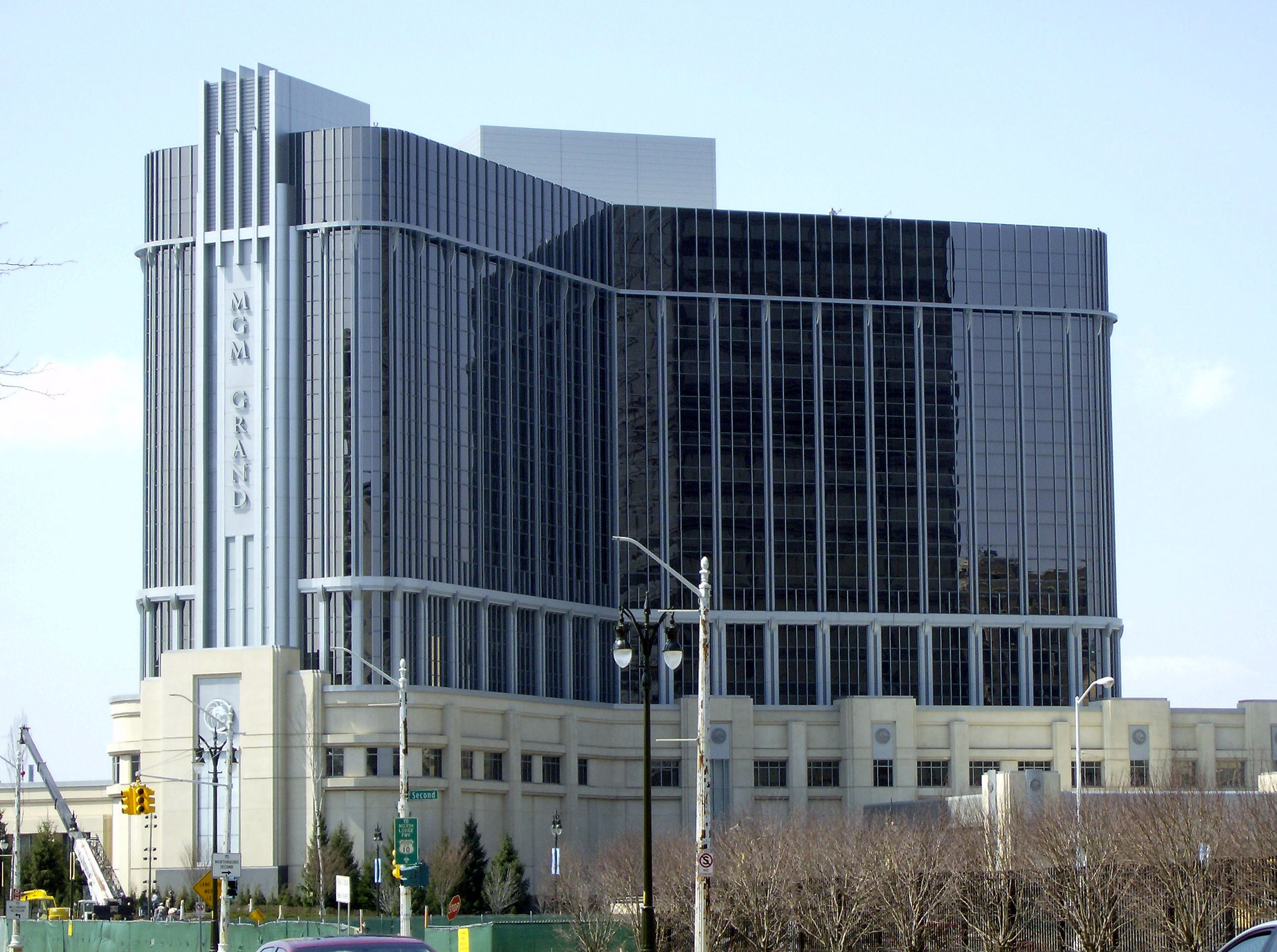
The MGM Grand Detroit is located in Detroit, Michigan.

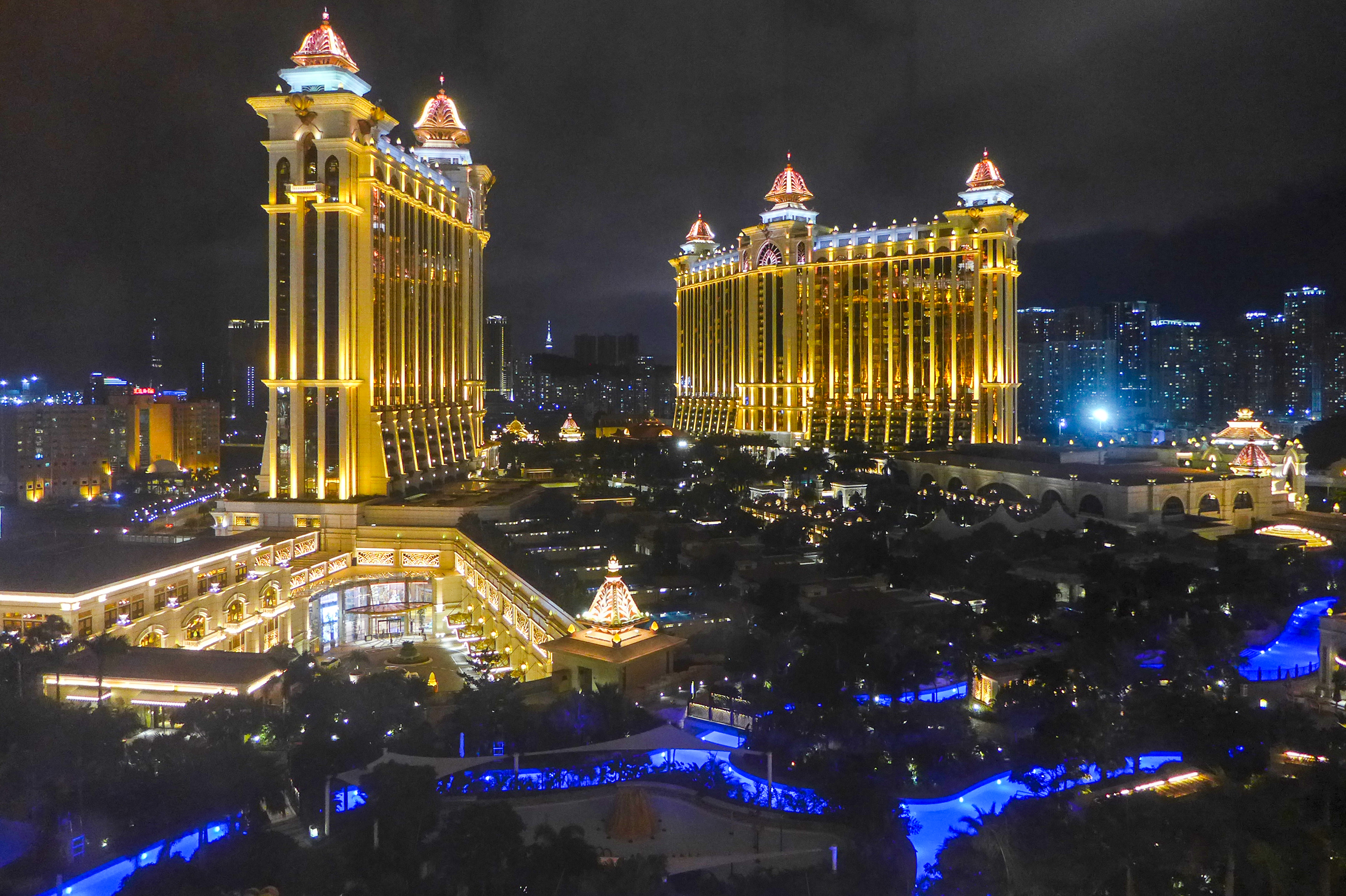
Galaxy Macau is located in Cotai, Macau

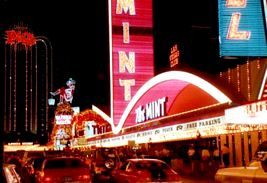
The Mint Las Vegas was a casino hotel in downtown Las Vegas that opened in 1957 and closed in 1988.

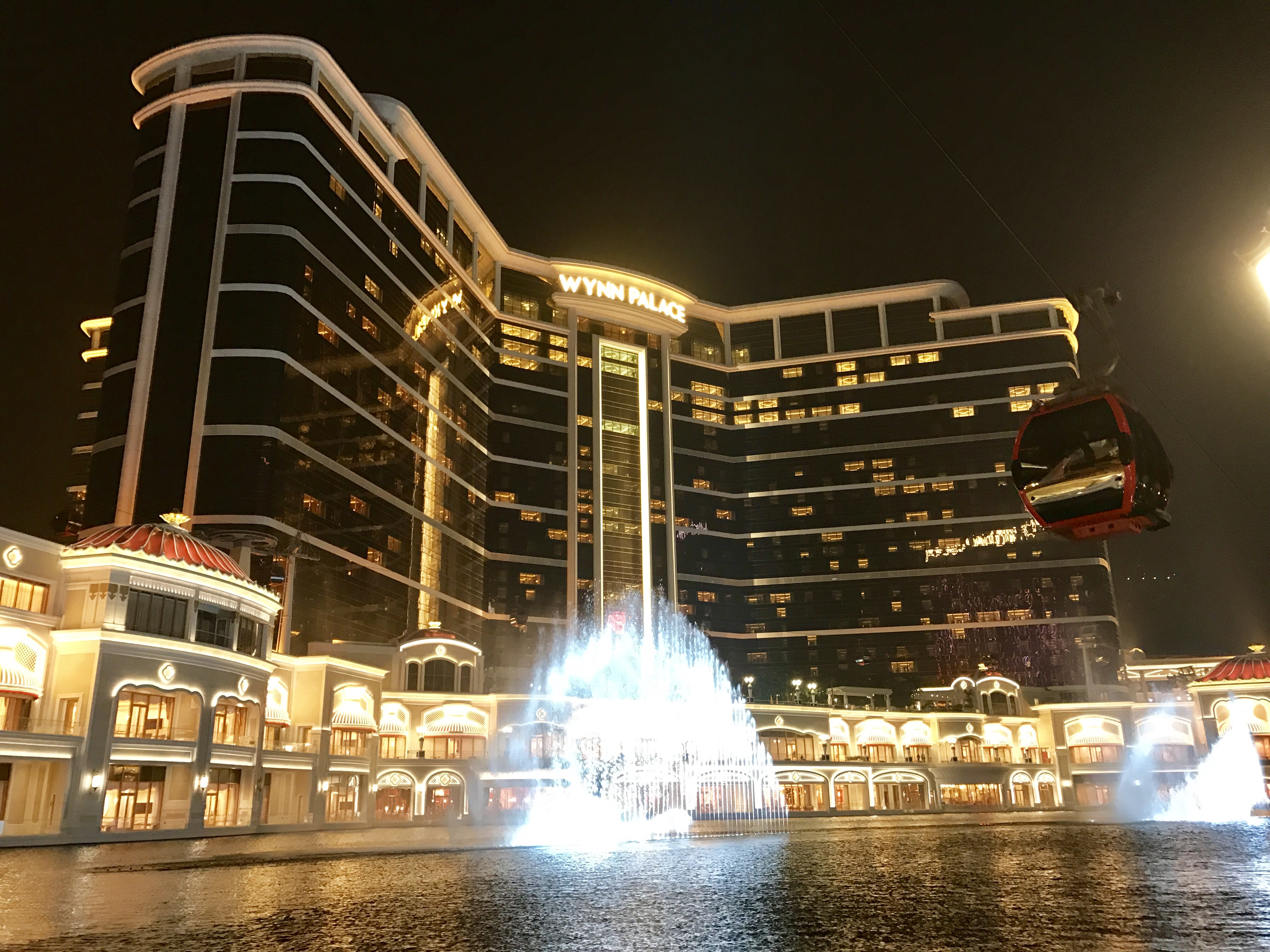
Wynn Palace opened in 2016, is located in Cotai, Macau

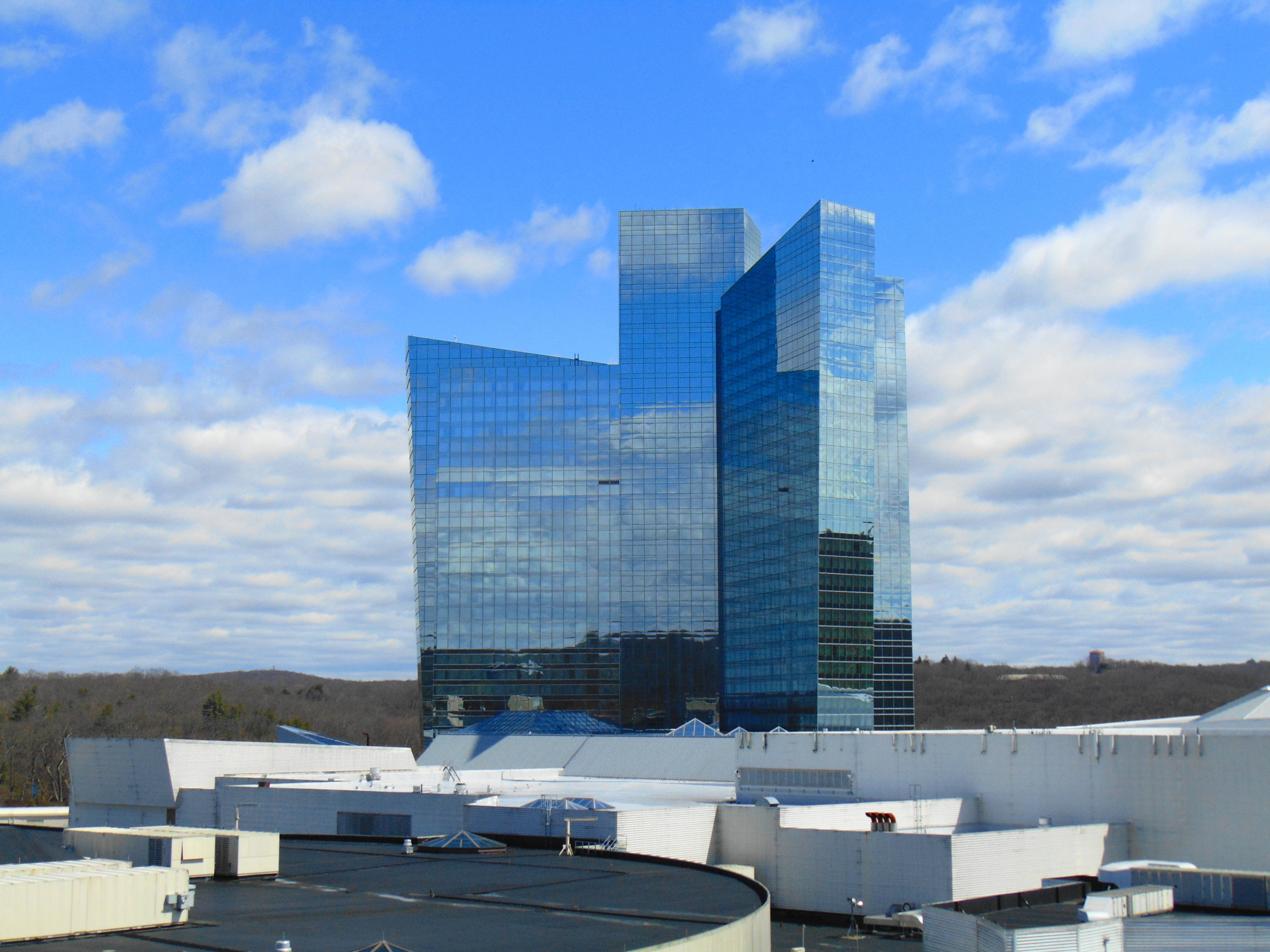
The Mohegan Sun in Uncasville, Connecticut, is one of the largest casinos in the United States with 364,000 square feet (33,800 square meters) of gaming space. The hotel has 1,356 rooms.

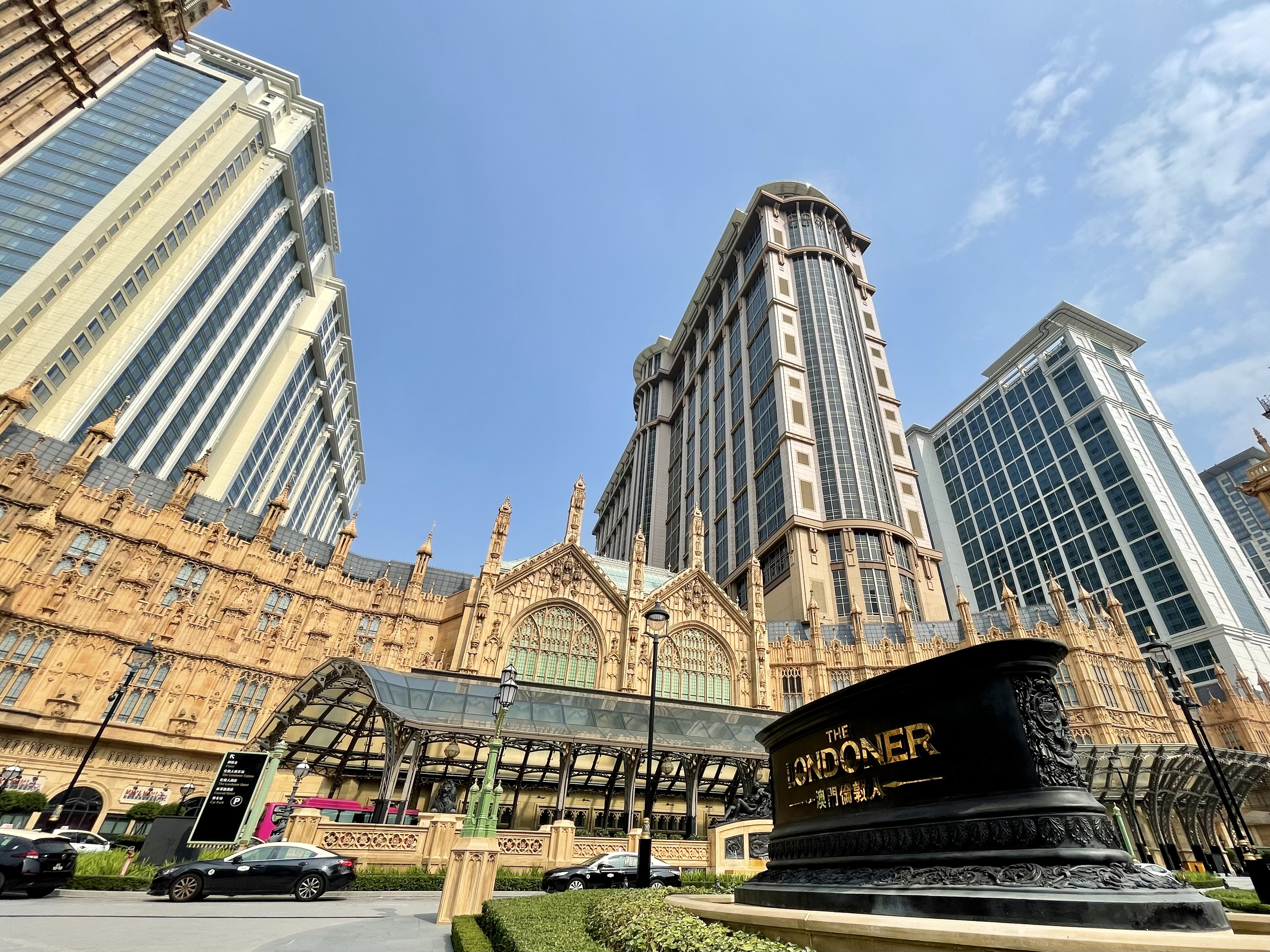
The Londoner Macao is a casino hotel in Cotai, Macau

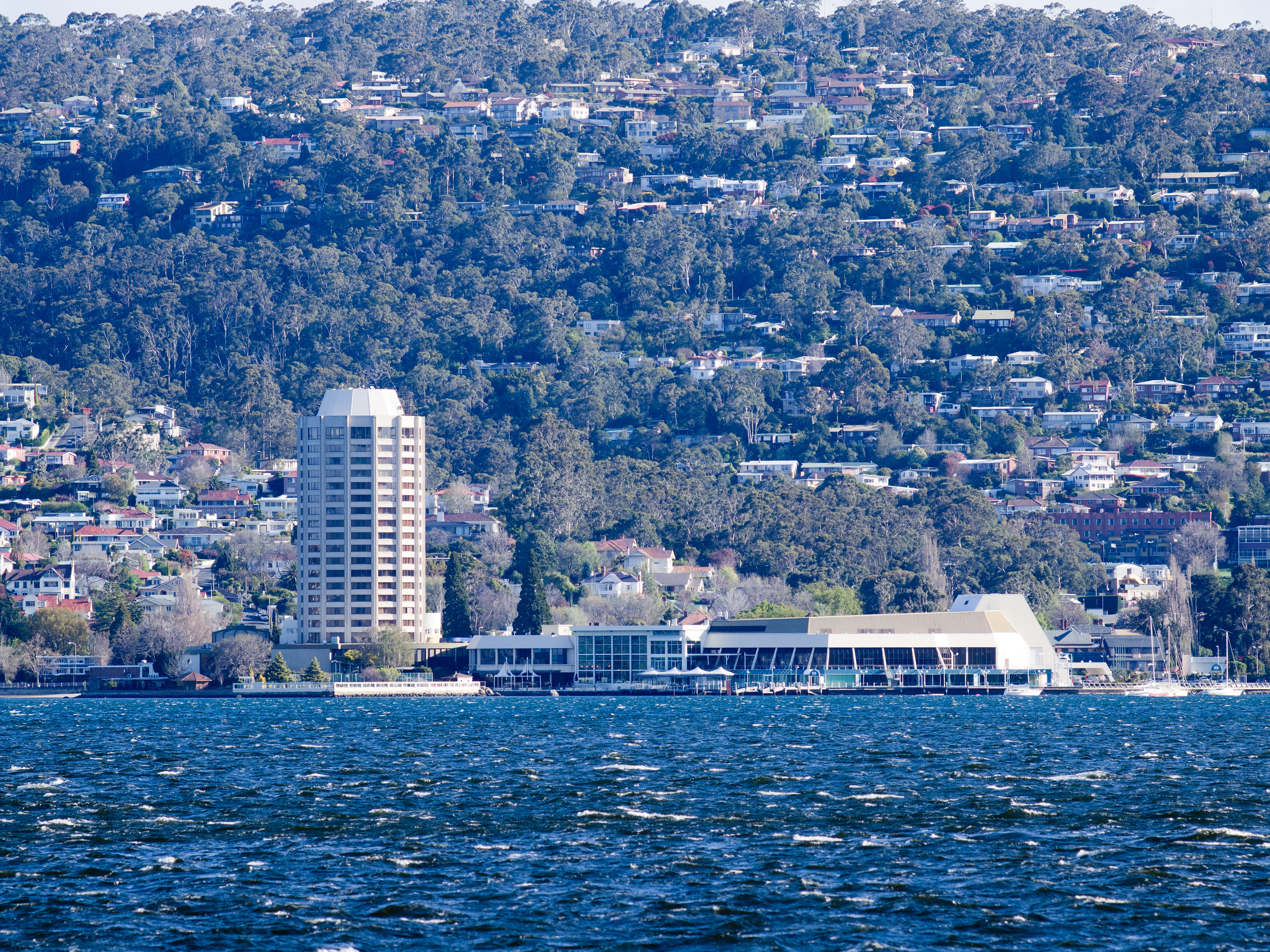
The Wrest Point Hotel Casino was Australia's first legal casino, and is located in Hobart, Tasmania.

- Agua Caliente Casino and Hotel
- Aladdin (defunct)
- Al Waddan Hotel
- Aliante Casino and Hotel
- Aquarius Casino Resort
- L'Arc Casino
- Aria Resort and Casino
- Arizona Charlie's Boulder
- Arizona Charlie's Decatur
- The Atlantic Club Casino Hotel (defunct)
- Atlantis Casino Resort Spa
- Atlantis Paradise Island
- L'Auberge Baton Rouge
- Baha Mar Casino & Hotel
- Bally's Atlantic City
- Bally's Casino Tunica (hotel demolished, now operating as 1st Jackpot Casino Tunica)
- Bear Claw Casino & Hotel
- Beau Rivage (Mississippi)
- Bellagio
- Belle of Baton Rouge
- Blue Chip Casino, Hotel and Spa
- Boardwalk Hotel and Casino (defunct)
- Boomtown New Orleans
- Boomtown Reno
- The Borgata
- Boulder Station
- Bourbon Street Hotel and Casino (defunct)
- Bullock Hotel
- Buffalo Bill's
- Cache Creek Casino Resort
- Cactus Pete's
- Caesars Atlantic City
- Caesars Palace
- Caesars Windsor
- California Hotel and Casino
- Camelot Hotel/Casino
- Cannery Casino and Hotel
- Carson Nugget
- Carson Station
- CasaBlanca Resort
- Casino Lisboa (Macau)
- Casino Magic Biloxi
- Casino New Brunswick
- Casino Rama
- Casino Royale Hotel & Casino
- Castaways (defunct)
- Castaways Hotel and Casino (defunct)
- Central Park Jakarta
- Chinook Winds Casino
- Choctaw Casino Resort
- Circa Resort & Casino
- Circus Circus Las Vegas
- Circus Circus Reno
- City of Dreams
- City of Dreams Sri Lanka
- Claridge Atlantic City (presently just a stand-alone hotel)
- Clarion Hotel and Casino
- Club Cal Neva
- Colorado Belle (closed)
- The Cosmopolitan of Las Vegas
- The Cromwell Las Vegas
- The D Las Vegas
- Delta Downs
- Desert Inn (defunct)
- Dover Downs Hotel & Casino
- Downtown Grand
- Dunes (defunct)
- Dunes Hotel and Casino (Atlantic City) (never completed)
- Eastside Cannery
- Edgewater Hotel and Casino
- El Cortez
- El Rancho Hotel and Casino (defunct)
- El Rancho Vegas (defunct)
- Eldorado Reno
- Emerald Resort & Casino
- Encore Boston Harbor
- Encore Las Vegas
- Excalibur Hotel and Casino
- Fiesta Henderson (defunct)
- Fiesta Rancho (defunct)
- FireKeepers Casino
- Fitzgeralds Casino and Hotel (defunct)
- Flamingo Las Vegas
- Fontainebleau Las Vegas
- Four Queens
- Four Winds New Buffalo
- Foxwoods Resort Casino
- Fremont Hotel and Casino
- Galaxy Macau
- Gold Coast Hotel and Casino
- Gold Dust West Hotel and Casino
- Gold Spike Hotel and Casino
- Golden Gate Hotel and Casino
- Golden Moon hotel and Casino
- Golden Nugget Atlantic City
- Golden Nugget Las Vegas
- Grand Casino Biloxi
- Grand Lisboa
- Grand Sierra Resort
- Greektown Casino Hotel
- Hacienda (defunct)
- Hard Rock Hotel and Casino Atlantic City
- Hard Rock Hotel and Casino (Biloxi)
- Hard Rock Hotel and Casino (Las Vegas) (defunct)
- Hard Rock Hotel and Casino (Stateline)
- Harlow's Casino Resort
- Harrah's Atlantic City
- Harrah's Cherokee
- Harrah's Council Bluffs
- Harrah's Laughlin
- Harrah's Reno
- Harrah's Resort Southern California
- Harveys Lake Tahoe
- Hollywood Casino Bangor
- Hollywood Casino Bay St. Louis
- Hollywood Casino Hotel and Raceway
- Hoover Dam Lodge (formerly known as Gold Strike and Hacienda)
- Horseshoe Casino Tunica
- Horseshoe Las Vegas (formerly known as Bally's)
- Hotel Carrasco
- Hotel de Paris (Monte Carlo, Monaco)
- Hotel Nevada and Gambling Hall
- Ibiza Gran Hotel (Spain)
- IP Casino Resort & Spa
- Island View Casino
- Isle of Capri Boonville
- Isle of Capri Casinos
- Jackpot Junction
- Jackson Rancheria Casino Resort
- Jumer's Casino & Hotel
- Key Largo (defunct)
- Klondike Hotel and Casino (defunct)
- Landmark (defunct)
- Lasseters Hotel Casino
- Laughlin River Lodge (formerly known as Sam's Town Gold River, Gold River and River Palms)
- The Linq
- Little Six Casino
- The Londoner Macao
- Longstreet Hotel, Casino, and RV Resort
- Lucky Club Casino and Hotel
- Lucky Dragon Hotel and Casino (defunct)
- Lumière Place
- Luxor Las Vegas
- M Resort
- Main Street Station Hotel and Casino and Brewery
- Mandalay Bay
- Mapes Hotel (defunct)
- Marina Hotel and Casino
- Marina Bay Sands (Singapore)
- Mayagüez Resort & Casino
- Mesquite Star (defunct)
- MGM Grand Detroit
- MGM Grand Las Vegas
- MGM Cotai
- MGM Macau
- Miccosukee Resort and Gaming
- The Mint Las Vegas (defunct)
- The Mirage (defunct)
- Mohegan Sun
- MontBleu
- Morongo Casino, Resort & Spa
- MotorCity Casino Hotel
- Mystic Lake Casino Hotel
- Nevada Landing Hotel and Casino (defunct)
- New Frontier Hotel and Casino (defunct)
- New York-New York Hotel and Casino
- Nugget Casino Resort
- Oasis (defunct)
- Ocean Casino Resort
- Okada Manila
- The Orleans
- Ormsby House (closed)
- Oyo Hotel & Casino (formerly known as Hooters Casino Hotel)
- Pakuwon Mall (formerly Resorts World Surabaya)
- Pala Casino Resort and Spa
- Palace Bingo and Casino
- Palace Station
- The Palazzo
- Palms Casino Resort
- Par-A-Dice Hotel and Casino
- Paris Las Vegas
- The Parisian Macao
- Park MGM
- Pechanga Resort & Casino
- Penthouse Boardwalk Hotel and Casino
- Peppermill Reno
- Peppermill Wendover
- Planet Hollywood Resort & Casino
- Plaza Hotel & Casino
- Podomoro City
- Potawatomi Hotel & Casino
- Primm Valley Resort
- Railroad Pass Casino
- Red Garter Casino
- The Reef Hotel Casino
- Regency Casino Mont Parnes (formerly Hotel Mont Parnes)
- Resorts Casino Hotel
- Resorts Casino Tunica
- Resorts World Bimini
- Resorts World Birmingham
- Resorts World Genting
- Resorts World Las Vegas
- Resorts World Manila
- Ocean Casino Resort (formerly Revel Atlantic City)
- Rio All Suite Hotel and Casino
- River Rock Casino Resort
- Riverside Hotel (Reno, Nevada) (defunct)
- Riverside Resort Hotel & Casino
- Riviera (defunct)
- Sahara Las Vegas
- Sahara Boardwalk Hotel and Casino
- San Juan Marriott Resort & Stellaris Casino
- Sands Atlantic City (defunct)
- Sands Macao
- Sands Hotel and Casino (defunct)
- Sands Regency
- Scarlet Pearl Casino
- Seminole Casino Hotel Immokalee
- Seminole Hard Rock Hotel and Casino Hollywood
- Seminole Hard Rock Hotel and Casino Tampa
- Seminole Hard Rock Hotel & Casino Kansas City (never opened under its initial planned proposal)
- Seneca Niagara Casino & Hotel
- Seven Clans Casino Thief River Falls
- Seven Feathers Casino Resort
- Showboat Atlantic City (defunct)
- Siena Reno (presently just a stand-alone hotel)
- Silver Star Hotel and Casino
- Silver Legacy Reno
- Silver Sevens (formerly known as Continental and Terrible's)
- Silverton Las Vegas (formerly known as Boomtown Las Vegas)
- Skyline Casino
- South Point Hotel, Casino & Spa
- Spirit Mountain Casino (Oregon)
- Stagecoach Hotel & Casino
- The Star Gold Coast
- The Star Sydney Casino & Hotel
- Stardust Resort and Casino (defunct)
- Stateline Casino (defunct)
- The Strat
- Studio City Macau
- Sun City Resort (South Africa)
- Sun International
- Suncoast Hotel and Casino
- Sunset Station
- Tachi Palace
- Texas Station (defunct)
- Thunder Valley Casino Resort
- Treasure Island Hotel and Casino
- Treasury Casino
- Tropicana Casino & Resort Atlantic City
- Tropicana Club
- Tropicana Express Hotel and Casino
- Tropicana Las Vegas (defunct)
- Trump Plaza Hotel and Casino (defunct)
- Trump Taj Mahal (defunct)
- Trump World's Fair (defunct)
- Tunica Roadhouse Casino & Hotel
- Tunjungan Plaza
- Turtle Creek Casino and Hotel
- Tuscany Suites and Casino
- Vacation Village (defunct)
- The Ville Resort-Casino
- Virgin Hotels Las Vegas
- Vegas World (defunct)
- The Venetian Las Vegas
- The Venetian Macao
- Viejas Casino
- Waterfront Cebu City Hotel & Casino
- Wendover Nugget
- The Western (defunct)
- Westgate Las Vegas
- Westin Las Vegas
- Westward Ho Hotel and Casino (defunct)
- Wheeling Island Hotel-Casino-Racetrack
- Whiskey Pete's (defunct)
- WinStar World Casino
- Wrest Point Hotel Casino
- Wynn Al Marjan Island
- Wynn Las Vegas
- Wynn Macau
- Wynn Palace

== See also ==
- List of integrated resorts
- List of casinos
  - List of casinos in the United States
- List of defunct gambling companies
- List of Las Vegas Strip hotels
  - Demolished or closed Strip casinos and hotels
- Lists of hotels – an index of hotel list articles on Wikipedia
- List of tourist attractions worldwide
