= Players International =

Players International was a company based in Atlantic City, New Jersey that built and operated riverboat casinos and a horse racing track.

== History ==
The company was founded by brothers David and Edward Fishman in 1984. The company was originally known for its "Player's Club," a service which offered discounts on rooms, shows and dining at various casinos in Las Vegas, Atlantic City and outside the country. Club members paid $125 for the first year's membership and a lower fee for annual renewals. The company advertised heavily on late-night television, with actor Telly Savalas as its spokesperson. In a time when casino gambling was only legal in Nevada and Atlantic City, casino ownership was much more fragmented than today and mass marketing was unheard of for casinos, the Player's Club concept proved popular. The company also arranged gaming tournaments for casinos and arranged travel for competing players.

After a brief foray into call-in telephone games based on Jeopardy! and Wheel of Fortune, the brothers decided to get out of the discount travel business and into the casino business itself. Casino legalization was spreading rapidly, especially in the Midwest, and the Fishmans applied for and received a license for a riverboat casino in Metropolis, Illinois. Backed by game show impresario and former talk show host Merv Griffin, the company opened the casino in 1993. With little competition close by, it was an immediate success.

Flush from the success of the Metropolis property, Players developed a second riverboat casino in Lake Charles, Louisiana later in 1993. With its proximity to the Texas state line, the Lake Charles property attracted gamblers from the Houston market, and was extremely profitable. The operation expanded in 1995 with the addition of a second riverboat, purchased from a closed casino operation on Lake Pontchartrain. This allowed guests to board at more convenient times, getting around state regulations which allowed them to board only during a 45-minute window every three hours by staggering the "cruise" schedules.

Also in 1995, the company purchased Bluegrass Downs, a small horse racing track in Paducah, Kentucky, just across the Ohio River from Metropolis. Players hoped that the Kentucky legislature would eventually legalize casino gaming at its horse tracks (a concept now known as a racino), and that the purchase would serve to stem any potential competition for the Metropolis boat.

Players' first and only land-based casino was the Players Island Resort in Mesquite, Nevada, about an hour away from Las Vegas. This resort featured a spa and luxury hotel, and was unusual in that one of its main marketing efforts was toward casino workers from Vegas.

The company's final major project was a third riverboat casino facility in Maryland Heights, Missouri, a suburb of St. Louis. This project was a joint venture with Harrah's Entertainment, with separate adjacent casino barges sharing parking and boarding facilities.

=== Harrah's takeover (2000) ===
The company started to feel the effects of increased competition from further legalization of casinos throughout the country, and turned its focus to its existing operations in 1997. The company briefly returned to profitability, enough so to emerge as a takeover target. The company's stock also became publicly traded by NASDAQ.

In 1999, Players entered into an agreement with Jackpot International to be acquired for $8.25 per share. But later that year, Harrah's approached the company with an unsolicited offer for $8.50. Jackpot would not match or beat the offer, so Players paid Jackpot a fee to back out of the deal and accepted the Harrah's offer. The deal amounted to $825 million.

The Metropolis and Lake Charles casinos became Harrah's Metropolis and Harrah's Lake Charles, respectively. Harrah's assumed full control of the joint venture in Maryland Heights. Players Island in Mesquite was not included in the deal, and was sold to Black Gaming, which operated the Virgin River Hotel and Casino in that city; the property was renamed CasaBlanca Resort and Casino. Harrah's retained a 50 percent interest in Bluegrass Downs. The deal was finalized in 2000.

== Casinos ==
- Players Island Lake Charles
- Players Island Metropolis
- Players Island Resort

== Horse racing tracks ==
- Bluegrass Downs

== See also ==
- Players (disambiguation)
