= List of casinos in Illinois =

This is a list of casinos in Illinois.

== List of casinos ==
List of casinos in the U.S. state of Illinois
| Casino | City | County | State | District | Type | Comments |
|---|---|---|---|---|---|---|
| American Place | Waukegan | Lake | Illinois | | | Temporary casino open; permanent casino planned to open in 2026. |
| Argosy Casino Alton | Alton | Madison | Illinois |
| Bally's Chicago | Chicago | Cook | Illinois | | | Under development, planned to open in 2026. |
| Bally's Quad Cities | Rock Island | Rock Island | Illinois |
| DraftKings at Casino Queen | East St. Louis | St. Clair | Illinois |
| FanDuel Sportsbook and Racing | Collinsville | Madison | Illinois | | Racino |
| Golden Nugget Danville | Danville | Vermilion | Illinois |
| Grand Victoria Casino Elgin | Elgin | Kane | Illinois |
| Hard Rock Casino Rockford | Rockford | Winnebago | Illinois |
| Harrah's Joliet | Joliet | Will | Illinois |
| Harrah's Metropolis | Metropolis | Massac | Illinois |
| Hollywood Casino Aurora | Aurora | Kane | Illinois |
| Hollywood Casino Joliet | Joliet | Will | Illinois |
| Par-A-Dice Casino | East Peoria | Tazewell | Illinois |
| Rivers Casino | Des Plaines | Cook | Illinois |
| Walker's Bluff Casino Resort | Carterville | Williamson | Illinois |
| Wind Creek Chicago Southland | East Hazel Crest | Cook | Illinois | | | Opened in November of 2024. |

== Gallery ==
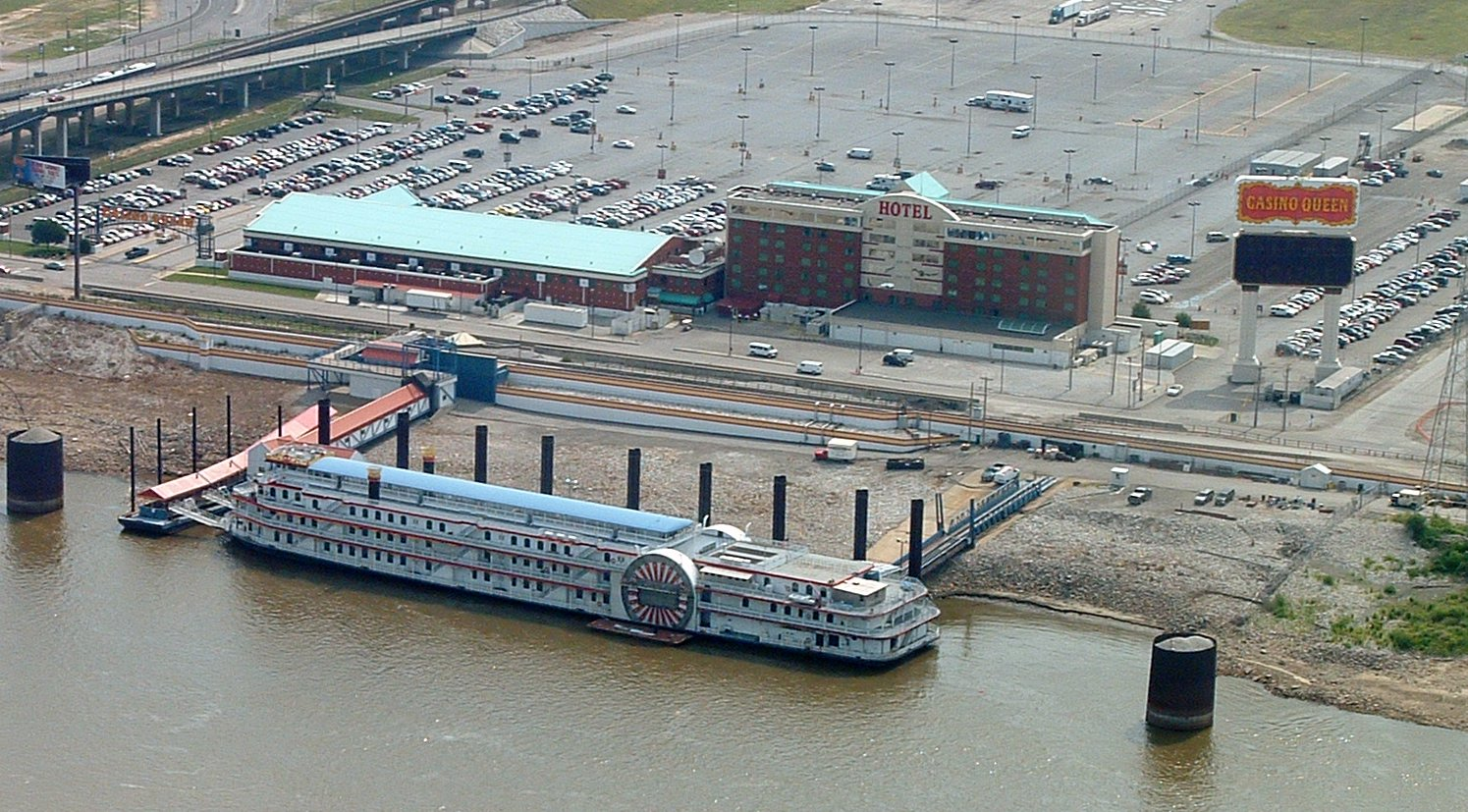
Casino Queen

== See also ==
- List of casinos in the United States
- List of casino hotels
