= Desert Valley =

Desert Valley may refer to:

== Places ==
- Desert Valley Hospital, San Bernardino County, California
- Indus Valley Desert
- Virgin Valley Heritage Museum, formerly known as the Desert Valley Museum

== Organizations ==
- Desert Valley Elementary School. See Peoria Unified School District

== Sports ==
- Desert Valley League, Riverside County, California
- Desert Valley Mountain Lions

== Other ==
- Desert Valley (film), a 1926 American silent Western film
