= Harrah's Metropolis =

Coordinates: 37.146906°N 88.735112°W

- Interactive map of Harrah's Metropolis
- Location: 100 East Front St. Metropolis, Illinois 62960
- Opened: 1993; 33 years ago
- No. of rooms: 214
- Gaming space: 24,269 square feet (2,254.7 m^{2})
- Notable restaurants: Bridges, Riverfront Grill
- Casino type: Riverboat
- Owner: Vici Properties
- Operating license holder: Caesars Entertainment
- Previous names: Players Island
- Website: caesars.com/harrahs-metropolis

Harrah's Metropolis is a riverboat casino located on the Ohio River in Metropolis, Illinois. It opened in 1993 as Players Island, a joint venture between Players International and show business impresario Merv Griffin as one of the state's first casinos. The property became part of Harrah's Entertainment (later Caesars Entertainment) with its 2000 acquisition of Players International.

In 2014, Harrah's was given permission from the Illinois Gaming Board to move its gaming floor from its riverboat to the property's convention center. Illinois law requires that gambling floors be over water, but does not require that they be located on a navigable river. This was achieved by installing water bladders underneath the building. In October 2017, ownership was transferred to Vici Properties as part of a corporate spin-off, and the property was leased back to Caesars.

Harrah's Metropolis includes a casino with more than 600 slot machines and 17 table games, a hotel with 214 rooms, and two restaurants.

== See also ==
- List of Caesars Entertainment properties
- List of casinos in Illinois
