= Rising Star Sports Ranch =

Resort in Nevada, United States

Rising Star Sports Ranch Resort
- Former names: Mesquite Star (1998–2000); Virgin River Convention Center (2000s)

General information
- Type: Hotel resort and sports facility
- Location: 333 North Sandhill Boulevard, Mesquite, Nevada, United States
- Coordinates: 36.810503°N 114.065149°W
- Construction started: 1996
- Opened: July 1, 1998 (Mesquite Star); October 1, 2016 (Rising Star)
- Renovated: 2015–16
- Cost: $23 million (Mesquite Star)
- Owner: Safari Hospitality

Technical details
- Floor count: 4 (hotel)

Design and construction
- Developer: NevStar Gaming (Mesquite Star)
- Main contractor: A.F. Construction (Mesquite Sar)

Other information
- Number of rooms: 210

Website
- www.risingstarsportsranch.com

Rising Star Sports Ranch Resort is a former hotel resort and sports facility in Mesquite, Nevada. It originally began construction in 1996, as the Mesquite Star hotel-casino. Construction was delayed because of financial issues, but it began to pick up heavily in October 1997. The Mesquite Star opened on July 1, 1998, although owner NevStar Gaming faced further financial problems and filed for Chapter 11 bankruptcy in December 1999. The Mesquite Star closed in March 2000, followed by a series of legal issues. It was purchased by Virgin River Casino Corporation, which later operated the facility without a casino as the Virgin River Convention Center.

The Lee family purchased the facility in 2013, and began remodeling it in 2015. It reopened on October 1, 2016, as the Rising Star, a non-gaming hotel resort that also serves as a facility for sports training and competitions. Mesquite had become known for its abundance of new sports facilities, which prompted the Lee family to include the sports element in the new resort. The Rising Star includes a 30,000 sq ft (2,800 m^{2}) indoor sports facility known as The Barn, which can seat up to 3,000 spectators. The resort also has a grass field and outdoor courts for various sports games.

The resort closed in 2025, was sold to Safari Hospitality, a Cedar City, Utah based hotel management firm, and was converted into a Holiday Inn Resort. The property reopened to the public as a Holiday Inn on April 10, 2025.

== History ==
=== Early years ===
Construction of the Mesquite Star hotel-casino began in 1996, and the property was initially scheduled to open in January 1997. NevStar Gaming & Entertainment Corporation, the project owner, intended to launch an initial public offering (IPO) during 1996, but the company cancelled such plans because of low investor demand. Construction was subsequently stalled for several months while the developers tried to obtain financing.

By the end of 1996, Hawaii businessman Richard Kelley had provided approximately $5 million in bridge financing to help the project while NevStar prepared for an IPO, expected for the first quarter of 1997. Kelley was the chairman of Outrigger Enterprises, which owned Outrigger Hotels & Resorts. Nevada real estate developer Richard Tam, a business partner of Kelley, was also an investor in the Mesquite Star. Tam had introduced Kelley to the project, and they subsequently became partners in it, as well as the largest shareholders in NevStar Gaming. NevStar later intended to launch its IPO in September 1997, to raise money for the project. Construction on the project picked up heavily in October 1997. By February 1998, NevStar had received a $5 million construction loan from the First Credit Bank of Los Angeles.

By April 1998, NevStar reached an agreement for the hotel portion of the Mesquite Star to be operated under the Best Western brand in affiliation with the hotel chain. That month, the Nevada Gaming Control Board deferred approval of the project, citing NevStar's limited financial reserves. The control board was concerned about the possibility of the hotel-casino entering bankruptcy shortly after its opening, an event that had been scheduled for Memorial Day weekend. In June 1998, the control board recommended that NevStar be approved for a gaming license to operate the Mesquite Star, after the company demonstrated that it had a cash reserve of at least $2 million, including a $1 million line of credit from Kelley and Tam. The Nevada Gaming Commission gave final approval later that month.

The Mesquite Star opened on July 1, 1998, becoming the fifth hotel-casino to open in Mesquite. The resort had an Old West theme. The facility included a 12,000 sq ft (1,100 m^{2}) casino with table games and 452 slot machines, and 210 hotel rooms affiliated with Best Western. It also had three restaurants and a cocktail lounge. The resort opened with 300 employees. The Mesquite Star was intended to capitalize on local residents and middle-income customers travelling along Interstate 15, which ran alongside the resort. In February 1999, the Mesquite Star hosted a bluegrass music festival and horseshoes tournament, and the resort constructed horseshoe courts for the event.

=== Financial problems and litigation ===
NevStar struggled financially after opening the Mesquite Star. The project cost an approximate total of $23 million, including land acquisition, permits, and construction costs. A.F. Construction built the facility. In early 1999, A.F. Construction sued NevStar for $853,500 in unpaid construction costs. NevStar was in the process of obtaining a loan to pay off the debt. Around the same time, NevStar was planning to eventually develop a shopping and entertainment complex adjacent to the Mesquite Star. Tam died in August 1999.

In November 1999, between 25 and 30 keno employees were laid off in an effort to streamline operations. NevStar had more than 200 creditors, and the company filed for Chapter 11 bankruptcy in December 1999. At the time, the filing was not expected to have an effect on operations at the Mesquite Star. NevStar offered a reorganization plan to a court, but it was rejected. On March 3, 2000, Randy Black Sr. was chosen by a court to operate the Mesquite Star on behalf of its creditors during the foreclosure process. Black applied for a temporary gaming license and was also considering a purchase of the hotel-casino. At the time, he also owned two other hotel-casino properties in Mesquite: the CasaBlanca and the Virgin River.

The casino portion closed on March 6, 2000, followed by the rest of the property on March 10. The Mesquite Star had employed approximately 270 people at the time. Black was to serve as receiver for the property's second mortgage holders, Richard Kelley and the Richard Tam Estate; the latter two were subsequently surprised to learn about the resources that would be needed to operate the hotel-casino. Black said that nearly every item in the Mesquite Star was leased, "from slot machines and table games in the casino to beds, chairs and linen in the hotel." Black said that when NevStar filed for bankruptcy, there were trucks outside the Mesquite Star waiting to collect the leased property. The Mesquite Star owed an estimated $150,000 in gaming taxes, and a substantial amount of debt was also owed to the companies leasing various items to the property. Kelley and the Tam Estate were unable to provide the necessary financing to pay the debt and continue operations at the Mesquite Star. As a result, Black withdrew his request for a gaming license several days after he was appointed.

The contents of the Mesquite Star were subsequently liquidated. As the liquidation process went forward, a Las Vegas casino supplier, Casino Data Systems, filed a lawsuit against NevStar. Casino Data Systems had previously provided video slot machines, signs, and other items to the Mesquite Star, but NevStar did not agree to release the items back to the casino supplier following the bankruptcy. The lawsuit sought to prevent NevStar from selling or removing the items.

Virgin River Casino Corporation, a company owned by Black, purchased NevStar's $5.4 million debt with its primary creditor, First Credit. The purchase took place in April 2000. Simultaneously, A.F. Construction had won court approval to proceed with a sheriff's sale of the Mesquite Star, in order to collect the debt that it was owed. The sale had been scheduled for May 2000, but Virgin River found out about it and objected, as did four other creditors.

In May 2000, Illinois-based AmeriResource Technologies announced that it would purchase the Mesquite Star. The acquisition would include vacant land that would be developed as a second phase, consisting of a 210-room hotel tower and a 300-pad RV park, both expected to be finished by the fourth quarter of 2000. AmeriResource was primarily involved in the construction industry, although it had intentions to branch out into other industries involving assisted care, apartments, mobile homes, and adult residences. A.F. Construction agreed to postpone its sale of the Mesquite Star after AmeriResource became interested in purchasing the property and paying off the creditors. At the end of May 2000, a $500,000 lawsuit was filed against NevStar by two former employees of the Mesquite Star. The suit was filed on behalf of 68 former employees, and it alleged that NevStar failed to cover health care costs for the workers.

Sale negotiations with AmeriResource broke down in June 2000, and the creditors resumed separate, competing efforts to auction the Mesquite Star. A foreclosure sale of the Mesquite Star had been scheduled for July 2000, but it was postponed hours prior, due to a motion filed on behalf of approximately 100 former employees. According to the motion, the workers' health coverage had been regularly deducted from their paychecks, but the money was diverted to an unknown location, leaving workers without health coverage. The motion sought to ensure that the workers would be compensated for their deducted wages. At the same time, the three primary creditors – Virgin River Casino Corporation, A.F. Construction, and Kelley – were involved in a court battle to determine which of them would be prioritized for debt payment, following the eventual sale of the Mesquite Star. NevStar filed for bankruptcy again in July 2000, putting a temporary halt to all planned auctions of the property. At the time, AmeriResource stated that it still intended to buy the Mesquite Star and was working with NevStar to secure financing for the purchase.

In September 2000, NevStar sued Black and Virgin River Casino Corporation, alleging that they conspired to get the Mesquite Star shut down and devalued, allowing Black to purchase the resort's debt at a discount. According to the suit, Black transferred Mesquite Star employees and patrons to his own hotel-casino properties in Mesquite following the closure in March 2000. The suit also stated that Black purchased NevStar's debt with First Credit at a discount price following negotiations, which Black had begun prior to his withdrawal as receiver. After purchasing the debt, Black then proceeded with a planned foreclosure sale. According to NevStar, the planned auction ultimately forced the company back into bankruptcy in July 2000.

=== Virgin River ownership ===
Virgin River Casino Corporation purchased the Mesquite Star in November 2000, and owned it for the next 12 years. Black said in January 2001 that he did not have a clear timetable for reopening the Mesquite Star because of ongoing financial problems associated with it, including foreclosure issues, and liens that had been placed on nearly every item inside the facility.

By 2004, the facility had been operating without a casino as the Virgin River Convention Center. The facility was also sometimes used for overflow hotel guests from Black's other properties in Mesquite. As of 2010, Black had intentions to reopen the Mesquite Star. The Mesquite Star was mostly well maintained throughout the years, with the exception of some water leakage in the central roof.

In December 2012, Virgin River Casino Corporation planned to sell the closed facility and property to Pilot Flying J, which intended to open a travel center on the land. Virgin River requested a zoning change that would allow for the travel center to operate on the site. At a city council public hearing, a majority of the residents in attendance expressed opposition to the proposed site for the travel center, voicing concerns that it would increase traffic in an area that was already busy. Former Mesquite mayor Susan Holecheck was also concerned about pollution being emitted from the new travel center. The zoning change would also be a deviation from the community's master plan. Intentions to open a travel center at the proposed location were cancelled in January 2013, when Pilot Flying J decided not to purchase the property.

=== Rising Star ===
In April 2013, the facility was sold to the Lee family, who also owned the Eureka hotel-casino in Mesquite. Deed restrictions meant that the Lee family could not implement large scale gaming at the resort, although Greg Lee did not consider this an issue, as he believed that gambling was not as popular as it used to be. Lee and his executive team thought about turning the facility into an assisted living home, but he said "that didn't excite me for the community's synergy and it wasn't a business I thought I would like." The Lee family eventually decided to renovate and reopen the property as a non-gaming hotel.

Mesquite had become known in recent years for its variety of new sports facilities, and Lee had friends who would call about hotel rooms in the area for when their children would play in local sports tournaments. Once Lee realized how many ball and soccer fields there were in Mesquite, he began to consider the idea of turning the Mesquite Star into a sports-themed hotel resort. The location was considered ideal for the resort because of its proximity to Interstate 15, as well as Las Vegas and St. George, Utah. Lee said, "We want to make Mesquite a place teams want to drive an extra hour to play in." A team of sports-related advisors – including coaches, trainers and camp directors – was created to inform the owners what they would want in a sports-themed resort. The new property would serve as the center of nearby sporting facilities, including ball fields, golf courses, and the Mesquite Rec Center. Andre Carrier, the chief operating officer of the new resort, said the intention was to create a property that would benefit from the abundance of sports facilities in the area.

Construction and remodeling began on August 3, 2015. In November 2015, it was announced that the property would be renamed Rising Star Sports Ranch Resort. Renovations proceeded at a rapid pace, ultimately putting the project ahead of schedule. The project was 90 percent complete as of August 2016, with only finishing touches remaining. The opening had been scheduled for December 2016, but it was moved closer because of the rapid renovation work.

The Rising Star opened on October 1, 2016, and an official grand opening was held on November 16. Sports memorabilia is located throughout the resort. Lee described the Rising Star as a sports facility for training and competition, and a vacation resort for people travelling with athletes. Child athletes are a target demographic. The hotel has four floors, with a total of 210 rooms. Some are adjoined rooms with bunk beds, allowing large sports teams, as well as parents or chaperones, to stay together.

A lighted grass field is located on-site, and it provides playing space for games such as football, lacrosse, and soccer. The property also includes a four-acre area outside the first-floor hotel rooms known as the Backyard. It features a swimming pool and picnic areas with barbecues, as well as various sporting areas, including courts for basketball, pickleball, and volleyball. The Backyard also includes a putting green, horseshoe pits, and chessboards.

The resort also includes the Victory Kitchen restaurant, which can seat up to 400 people, and includes pizza and chicken wings among its menu items. An arcade is also located inside the resort, featuring more than 50 games and a two-lane bowling alley. The resort also features a 7,000 sq ft (650 m^{2}) ballroom, capable of holding 400 guests. The Rising Star has several technologically advanced features, including room-service robots that have a pre-programmed map of the hotel and can deliver items to guests. Robots are stationed on each floor of the hotel. RFID wristbands are used for access to hotel rooms, the pool, and arcade games, and they can also be used to pay for restaurant meals.

The resort was built with the intention that a majority of customers would be families from Las Vegas. Although the resort was successful in its early months, many of its customers were from neighboring states rather than Las Vegas. As a hotel without a casino, the Rising Star became popular as a suitable, non-gaming alternative for underage guests who were participating in local youth-sporting events. The Rising Star has hosted numerous sports events, including some with groups such as Nike and the Utah Youth Soccer Association. The resort has also hosted sports teams from Arizona, California, Idaho, Utah, and Wyoming. Planet Athlete, a basketball program, relocated from Phoenix, Arizona to the Rising Star. Through the program, students live at the resort and study at the Mesquite campus of the College of Southern Nevada.

A baseball training facility opened in early November 2016, and includes 70-foot batting cages. A 30,000 sq ft (2,800 m^{2}) indoor sports facility, known as The Barn, was under construction at the time of the resort's opening. The facility, designed to resemble a red barn, was opened in May 2017, marking the completion of the Rising Star resort. The interior of The Barn has a wood floor for games such as basketball, and the facility can be reconfigured to form multiple courts for games such as pickleball and volleyball. AstroTurf is used to cover the floor for sport games that require it. The Barn is air-conditioned, allowing athletes to play or practice inside during the hot summer season. The facility can seat up to 3,000 spectators, and is considered a major aspect of the resort. The Nevada Desert Dogs played basketball games at The Barn during 2018, and the UNLV Runnin' Rebels also stayed and practiced at the resort.

=== Closure ===
The property was listed for sale in November 2023. Rising Star was closed in 2025 for remodeling and reopened on April 10, 2025 as a Holiday Inn Resort. Future renovations will include a lazy river, outdoor bar, game room, and sports bar.
