= William Redd =

American businessperson (1911–2003)

- Born: November 16, 1911; Union, Mississippi, U.S.
- Died: October 14, 2003 (aged 91); Solana Beach, California, U.S.
- Education: East Central Junior College; University of Mississippi
- Occupations: Businessman, philanthropist
- Spouse: 3
- Children: 2 daughters

William Redd, also known as Si Redd (1911–2003) was an American businessman and philanthropist. He was the founder of International Game Technology, a slot machine manufacturer and distributor. He was the owner of the Oasis, a hotel and casino in Mesquite, Nevada. He was the rightsholder of video poker, and he became known as the "king of slot machines".

== Early life ==
Redd was born on November 16, 1911, in Union, Mississippi. His father was a sharecropper. He grew up in Philadelphia, Mississippi.

Redd attended East Central Junior College in Decatur, Mississippi, and he graduated from the University of Mississippi in Oxford, Mississippi.

== Career ==
Redd began his career in college, when he invested in a pinball machine in a small eatery in Mississippi. He then founded Northwestern Music Co., and he distributed Wurlitzer jukeboxes in Sterling, Illinois, and Dixon, Illinois, with his brother-in-law. He subsequently became a distributor for Bally Manufacturing in Boston, Massachusetts. In 1967, he moved on to the market in Reno, Nevada. Redd founded a subsidiary, Bally Distribution Co., and he distributed jukeboxes in Carson City, Nevada, and Las Vegas. He also acquired the rights to video poker. In 1975, he founded Sircoma, later known as the International Game Technology, a slot machine manufacturer and distributor based in Reno. He sold it to Gtech in 1986, and served on its board of directors until 1991.

Redd developed Pride of Mississippi, a gaming boat off the coast of Mississippi on the Gulf of Mexico, but it went bankrupt and he lost US$20 million in it. He was the owner of Oasis, a hotel and casino in Mesquite, Nevada, from 1976 to 2001. He sold it for US$31 million. Meanwhile, he founded the Mesquite Vistas Land Development Co. and the Oasis Golf Course.

Redd was inducted into the Gaming Hall of Fame in 1991, and the Nevada Business Hall of Fame in 2002.

== Philanthropy ==
Redd made charitable contributions to the University of Nevada, Las Vegas, where he was a member of the UNLV Gift Club Palladium Society. Moreover, the Si Redd Room and the Redd Vision video screen scoreboard at the Thomas & Mack Center are named in his honor. He received the Chin's Humanitarian of the Year Award from the Muscular Dystrophy Association in 2001.

Redd founded the Las Vegas International Cultural Trade Center and Wild Animal Conservancy. He donated US$150,000 to Problem Gambling Consultants, a non-profit organization for gambling addicts.

== Personal life, death and legacy ==
Redd was married three times. His first wife, Ivy Lee, died in 1974. His second wife, Marilyn, died in 1996. His third wife, Tamara, outlived him. He had two daughters, Vinnie Copeland and Sherry Green. He resided in Las Vegas, Nevada, and summered in Solana Beach, California. He was a member of the Las Vegas Country Club.

Redd died on October 14, 2003, in Solana Beach, California. He was 91 years old. His funeral was held at the Palm Mortuary in Las Vegas, Nevada.
