= Mesquite Airport =

Airport in Nevada, United States

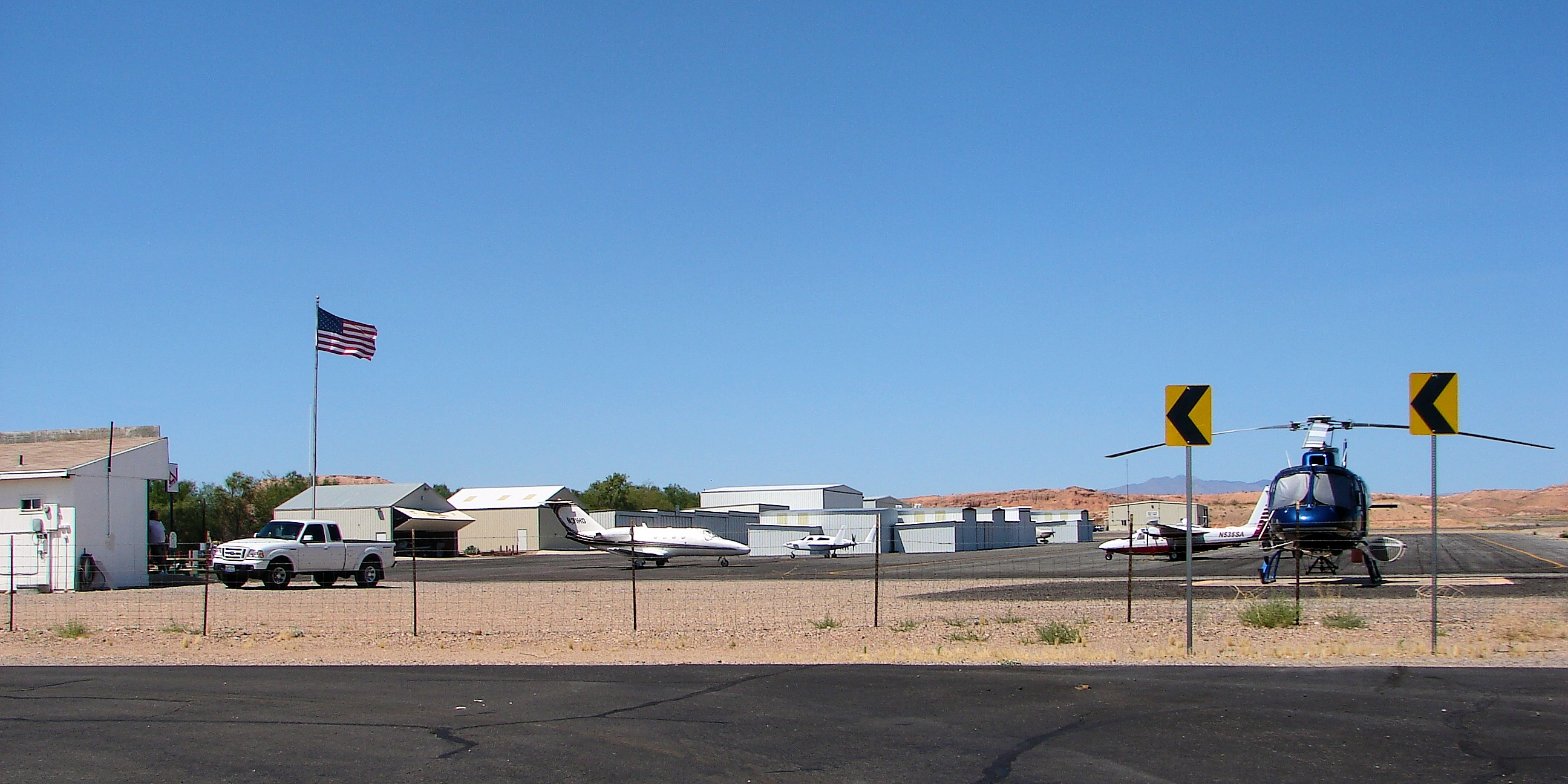
- IATA: MFH; ICAO: none; FAA LID: 67L

Summary
- Airport type: Public
- Owner: City of Mesquite
- Serves: Mesquite, Nevada
- Elevation AMSL: 1,978 ft (603 m)
- Coordinates: 36°49′59″N 114°03′21″W

Map
- Location of airport in Nevada 67L (the United States)

Runways
Direction	Length		Surface
Direction	ft	m	Surface
1/19	5,121	1,561	Asphalt

Helipads
Number	Length		Surface
Number	ft	m	Surface
H1	20	6	Concrete

Statistics (2011)
- Aircraft operations: 15,050
- Based aircraft: 22
- Source: Federal Aviation Administration

Mesquite Airport (IATA: MFH, FAA LID: 67L) is a public use airport located two nautical miles (4 km) north of the central business district of Mesquite, in Clark County, Nevada, United States. It is owned by the City of Mesquite.

The National Plan of Integrated Airport Systems for 2011–2015 categorized it as a general aviation facility.

== Facilities and aircraft ==
Mesquite Airport covers an area of 155 acres (63 ha) at an elevation of 1,978 feet (603 m) above mean sea level. It has one runway designated 1/19 with an asphalt surface measuring 5,121 by 75 feet (1,561 x 23 m). It also has one helipad designated H1 with a concrete surface measuring 20 by 20 feet (6 x 6 m).

For the 12-month period ending January 31, 2011, the airport had 15,050 aircraft operations, an average of 41 per day: 99.7% general aviation and 0.3% military. At that time there were 22 aircraft based at this airport: 86% single-engine, 9% ultralight, and 5% jet.

== See also ==
- List of airports in Nevada
