= Clark L. Reber =

American politician (1937–2025)

Clark Reber

Member of the Utah House of Representatives
- In office 1983–1987
- In office 1993–1995

Personal details
- Born: Clark Leonard Reber; August 21, 1937 Mesquite, Nevada, U.S.
- Died: January 13, 2025 (aged 87) Washington, Utah, U.S.
- Party: Republican
- Education: University of Nevada, Reno; Brigham Young University

Clark Leonard Reber (August 21, 1937 – January 13, 2025) was an American politician. A member of the Republican Party, he served in the Utah House of Representatives from 1983 to 1987 and again from 1993 to 1995.

== Life and career ==
Reber was born in Mesquite, Nevada, the son of Leonard and Daisy Reber. He attended the University of Nevada, Reno on a Harold's Club scholarship. He also attended Brigham Young University. He was a helicopter pilot in the United States Army and in the United States Army Reserve.

Reber served in the Utah House of Representatives from 1983 to 1987 and again from 1993 to 1995.

== Death ==
Reber died on January 13, 2025, at his home in Washington, Utah, at the age of 87.
