= The Ville Resort-Casino =

Coordinates: 19.25298°S 146.82669°E

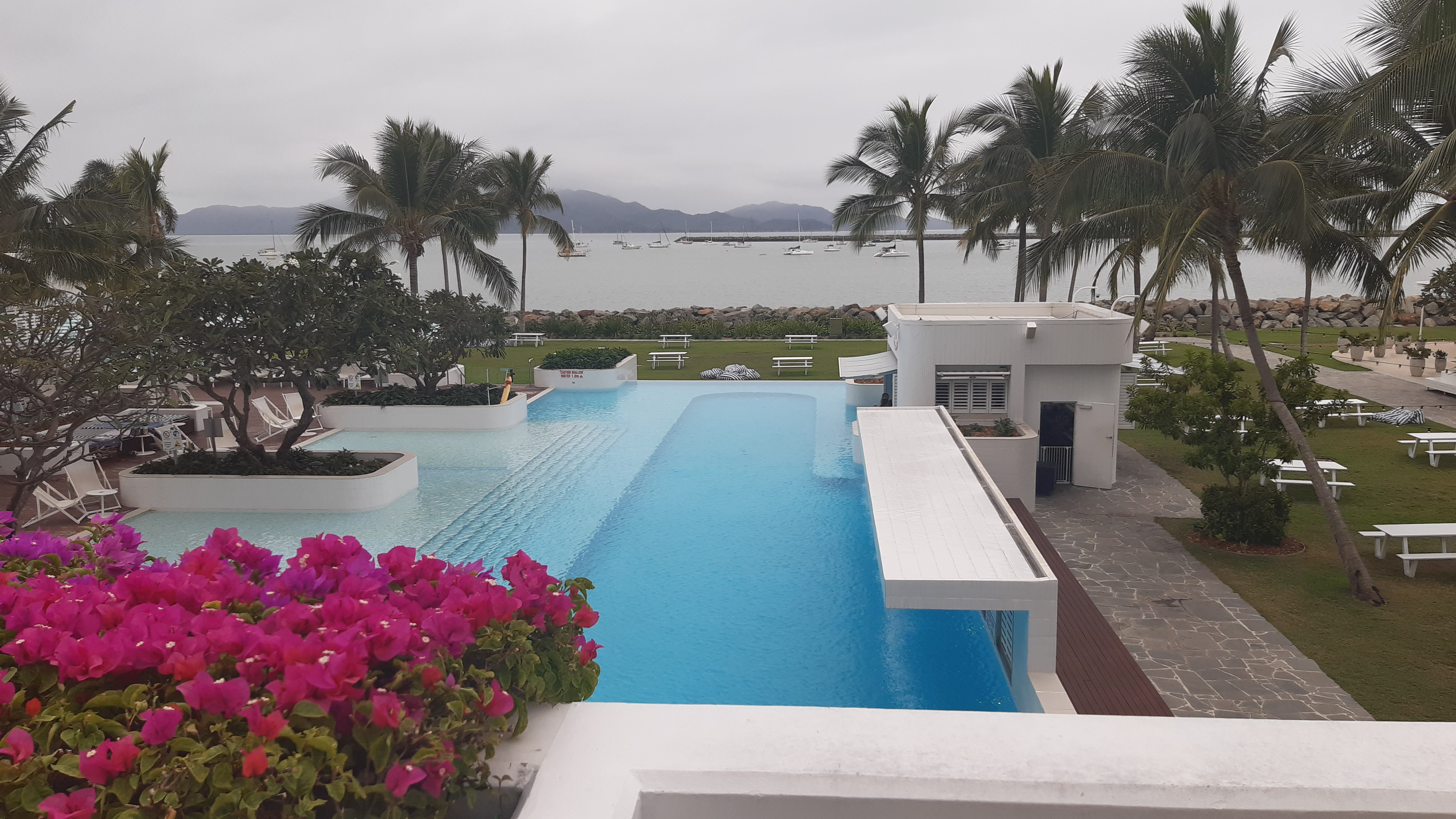
- View from The Ville towards Magnetic Island
- Interactive map of The Ville Resort-Casino
- Location: Townsville City, Queensland
- Owner: Colonial Leisure Group
- Website: https://www.the-ville.com.au/

The Ville Resort-Casino (formerly Jupiters Hotel and Casino and The Sheraton Breakwater Hotel and Casino) is the only casino in Townsville, Queensland. The hotel has 194 hotel rooms.
