= Mesquite, Nevada =

City in Nevada, United States

- City
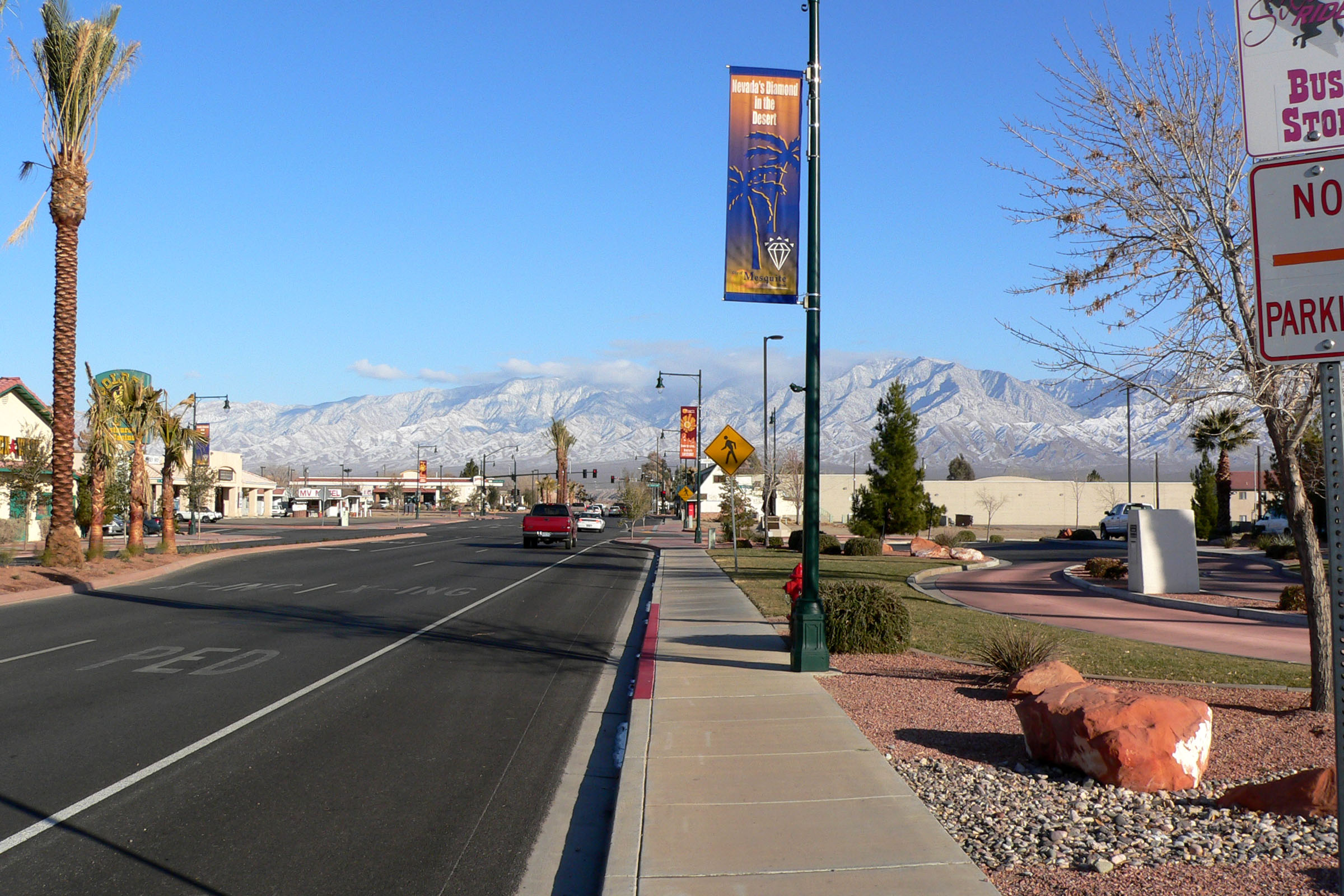
- Main Street in January 2007, near City Hall

- Flag Logo
- Motto(s): Escape, Momentarily
- Location of Mesquite in Clark County, Nevada

- Location in the United States Mesquite (the United States)
- Coordinates: 36°48′9″N 114°4′56″W
- Country: United States
- State: Nevada
- County: Clark
- Settled: 1880
- Incorporated: 1984

Government
  - Mayor: Jesse Whipple
  - Mayor Pro Tem: Pattie Gallo
  - City Council: Bill Ennis; Karen Fielding; Paul Wanlass; Kevin Parrish
  - City Manager: Martine Green

Area
  - Total: 32.23 sq mi (83.47 km^{2})
  - Land: 31.76 sq mi (82.27 km^{2})
  - Water: 0.46 sq mi (1.20 km^{2})
- Elevation: 1,601 ft (488 m)

Population (2020)
  - Total: 20,471
  - Density: 644.5/sq mi (248.84/km^{2})
- Time zone: UTC−8 (PST)
  - Summer (DST): UTC−7 (PDT)
- ZIP codes: 89024, 89027, 89034
- Area codes: 702 and 725
- FIPS code: 32-46000
- GNIS feature ID: 0842060
- Website: www.mesquitenv.gov

Mesquite is a city located in the northeast corner of Clark County, Nevada, United States adjacent to the Arizona state line and 80 miles (130 km) northeast of Las Vegas on Interstate 15. As of the 2020 census, the city had a population of 20,471. The city is located in the Virgin River valley adjacent to the Virgin Mountains in the northeastern part of the Mojave Desert. It is home to a growing retirement community, as well as several casino resorts and golf courses.

== History ==
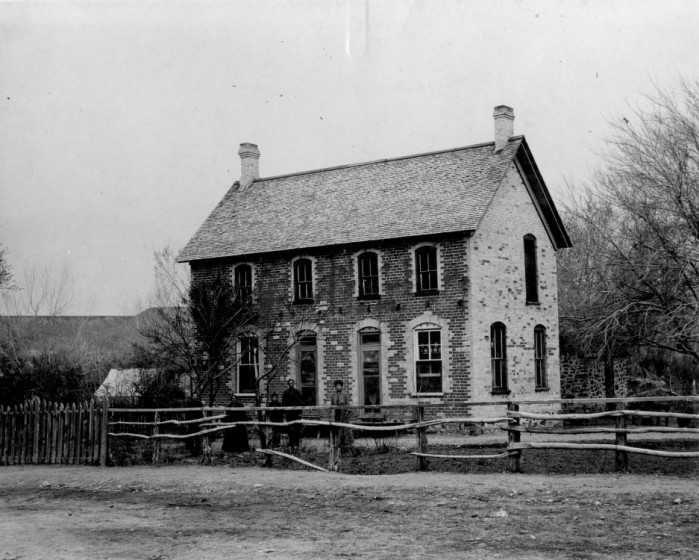
Home of Mormon pioneer Franklin S. Leavitt, c. 1900

Mesquite was settled by Mormon pioneers in 1880, who called it Mesquite Flat. The community was finally established on the third attempt after having been flooded out from the waters of the Virgin River. The name was later shortened to Mesquite, and the city was incorporated 1984. The community was named for the mesquite timber near the original town site. Mesquite, like nearby Bunkerville, had its origins in farming. The Peppermill Mesquite casino, which opened in the 1970s, drove Mesquite's diversified economy. The city incorporated in 1984 and established a master development plan during the early 1990s. In the mid-1990s, more casinos opened. By 2006, Mesquite was one of the fastest-growing small towns in the United States, though the late-2000s recession led to the closure of the Oasis (formerly the Peppermill) casino.

== Geography ==
Mesquite occupies the northeast corner of Clark County. The eastern border of the city is the Arizona state line. The city is in the Virgin River valley, occupying the northern side of the river. The city lies adjacent to the Virgin Mountains in the northeastern Mojave Desert near the southern mouth of the Virgin River Gorge.

Interstate 15 passes through the city, leading southwest 80 miles (130 km) to downtown Las Vegas and northeast 39 miles (63 km) to St. George, Utah. Nevada State Route 170 leads south from the center of town, crossing the Virgin River into the unincorporated community of Bunkerville before looping back to I-15 at the western city limits of Mesquite.

According to the U.S. Census Bureau, the city of Mesquite has a total area of 32.4 square miles (83.8 km^{2}), of which 31.9 square miles (82.6 km^{2}) is land and 0.46 square miles (1.2 km^{2}), or 1.40%, is water.

== Demographics ==
Historical population
Census	Pop.	Note	%±
1990	1,871		—
2000	9,389		401.8%
2010	15,276		62.7%
2020	20,471		34.0%
U.S. Decennial Census

=== Racial and ethnic composition ===
Mesquite city, Nevada – Racial composition Note: the US Census treats Hispanic/Latino as an ethnic category. This table excludes Latinos from the racial categories and assigns them to a separate category. Hispanics/Latinos may be of any race.
Race (NH = Non-Hispanic)	2020	2010	2000	1990
White alone (NH)	71.7% (14,674)	71.3% (10,896)	71.5% (6,716)	86.3% (1,615)
Black alone (NH)	1% (204)	0.9% (137)	0.5% (49)	0.4% (7)
American Indian alone (NH)	0.6% (127)	0.7% (113)	0.7% (62)	0.9% (17)
Asian alone (NH)	1.7% (358)	1.7% (265)	1.3% (118)	0.7% (14)
Pacific Islander alone (NH)	0.2% (37)	0.2% (34)	0.1% (7)	
Other race alone (NH)	0.4% (75)	0.1% (17)	0.1% (12)	0.2% (3)
Multiracial (NH)	2.9% (585)	1% (156)	1.1% (101)	—
Hispanic/Latino (any race)	21.5% (4,411)	23.9% (3,658)	24.8% (2,324)	11.5% (215)

=== 2020 census ===
As of the 2020 census, Mesquite had a population of 20,471. The median age was 62.5 years. 13.9% of residents were under the age of 18 and 44.5% of residents were 65 years of age or older. For every 100 females there were 96.8 males, and for every 100 females age 18 and over there were 96.2 males age 18 and over.

93.4% of residents lived in urban areas, while 6.6% lived in rural areas.

There were 9,449 households in Mesquite, of which 15.2% had children under the age of 18 living in them. Of all households, 56.3% were married-couple households, 16.8% were households with a male householder and no spouse or partner present, and 21.3% were households with a female householder and no spouse or partner present. About 27.3% of all households were made up of individuals and 18.4% had someone living alone who was 65 years of age or older.

There were 11,198 housing units, of which 15.6% were vacant. The homeowner vacancy rate was 2.0% and the rental vacancy rate was 8.3%.

Racial composition as of the 2020 census
Race	Number	Percent
White	15,453	75.5%
Black or African American	229	1.1%
American Indian and Alaska Native	206	1.0%
Asian	377	1.8%
Native Hawaiian and Other Pacific Islander	39	0.2%
Some other race	2,424	11.8%
Two or more races	1,743	8.5%
Hispanic or Latino (of any race)	4,411	21.5%

=== 2010 census ===
As of the census of 2010, there were 15,276 people, 8,911 houses, 6,378 Houses occupied, and 4,444 families residing in the city.

=== 2000 census ===
As of the 2000 census, the population density was 613.3 inhabitants per square mile (236.8/km^{2}). There were 4,442 housing units at an average density of 290.1 per square mile (112.0/km^{2}). The racial makeup of the city was 80.30% White, 1.27% Asian, 0.98% Native American, 0.65% African American, 0.07% Pacific Islander, 14.56% from other races, and 2.17% from two or more races. Hispanic or Latino of any race were 24.75% of the population. There were 3,498 households, out of which 28.7% had children under the age of 18 living with them, 62.8% were married couples living together, 7.2% had a female householder with no husband present, and 26.5% were non-families. Of all households, 20.4% were made up of individuals, and 7.4% had someone living alone who was 65 years of age or older. The average household size was 2.66 and the average family size was 3.08.

In the city, the population was spread out, with 25.6% under the age of 18, 7.7% from 18 to 24, 22.8% from 25 to 44, 27.3% from 45 to 64, and 16.6% who were 65 years of age or older. The median age was 40 years. For every 100 females, there were 103.8 males. For every 100 females age 18 and over, there were 104.0 males. The median income for a household in the city was $40,392, and the median income for a family was $42,941. Males had a median income of $27,083 versus $24,402 for females. The per capita income for the city was $20,191. About 6.2% of families and 10.2% of the population were below the poverty line, including 18.3% of those under age 18 and 6.0% of those age 65 or over.

== Education ==
The city of Mesquite is a part of the Clark County School District. There are four public schools in the valley.

School	Location	Grades
Virgin Valley Elementary	Mesquite	K–5
Joseph L. Bowler Elementary	Bunkerville	K–5
Charles A. Hughes Middle School	Mesquite	6–8
Virgin Valley High School	Mesquite	9–12

Mesquite has a public library, a branch of the Las Vegas-Clark County Library District.

== Climate ==
Located within the Mojave Desert, Mesquite experiences a desert climate with a large degree of diurnal temperature variation. Roughly 500 ft lower than Las Vegas, Mesquite is typically about 3 degrees Fahrenheit hotter than Las Vegas during the day. Unlike Las Vegas, Mesquite lacks an urban heat island. This makes low temperatures noticeably more comfortable in the summer, but means winter nights are colder.

Like other weather stations in the Mojave and Sonoran desert, the annual temperature cycle is asymmetric, with a seasonal lag of roughly 1 month in summer, and a seasonal lead in winter. The hottest time of the year on average is July 21, with an average high of 106 and low of 72. Conversely, the normal high temp drops to the lowest value of the year, 57 degrees, and low of 28 on December 16, approximately 6 days before the winter solstice. This seasonal lag in summer and seasonal lead in winter can be found in other climate stations in the same region.

Climate data for Mesquite, NV
Month	Jan	Feb	Mar	Apr	May	Jun	Jul	Aug	Sep	Oct	Nov	Dec	Year
Record high °F (°C)	77 (25)	84 (29)	99 (37)	103 (39)	115 (46)	120 (49)	123 (51)	118 (48)	112 (44)	106 (41)	90 (32)	78 (26)	123 (51)
Mean daily maximum °F (°C)	62.0 (16.7)	65.9 (18.8)	74.1 (23.4)	82.8 (28.2)	92.8 (33.8)	102.1 (38.9)	107.7 (42.1)	106.0 (41.1)	99.7 (37.6)	86.7 (30.4)	70.4 (21.3)	62.4 (16.9)	84.4 (29.1)
Mean daily minimum °F (°C)	29.5 (−1.4)	34.2 (1.2)	39.6 (4.2)	47.2 (8.4)	55.6 (13.1)	63.4 (17.4)	70.3 (21.3)	69.9 (21.1)	59.7 (15.4)	48.7 (9.3)	36.3 (2.4)	29.7 (−1.3)	48.7 (9.3)
Record low °F (°C)	2 (−17)	18 (−8)	20 (−7)	28 (−2)	39 (4)	45 (7)	52 (11)	52 (11)	44 (7)	33 (1)	20 (−7)	12 (−11)	2 (−17)
Average precipitation inches (mm)	0.53 (13)	1.09 (28)	0.56 (14)	0.49 (12)	0.04 (1.0)	0.10 (2.5)	0.51 (13)	0.48 (12)	0.33 (8.4)	0.64 (16)	0.60 (15)	0.48 (12)	5.85 (146.9)
Source: http://www.wrcc.dri.edu/cgi-bin/cliMAIN.pl?nv5085

== Media ==
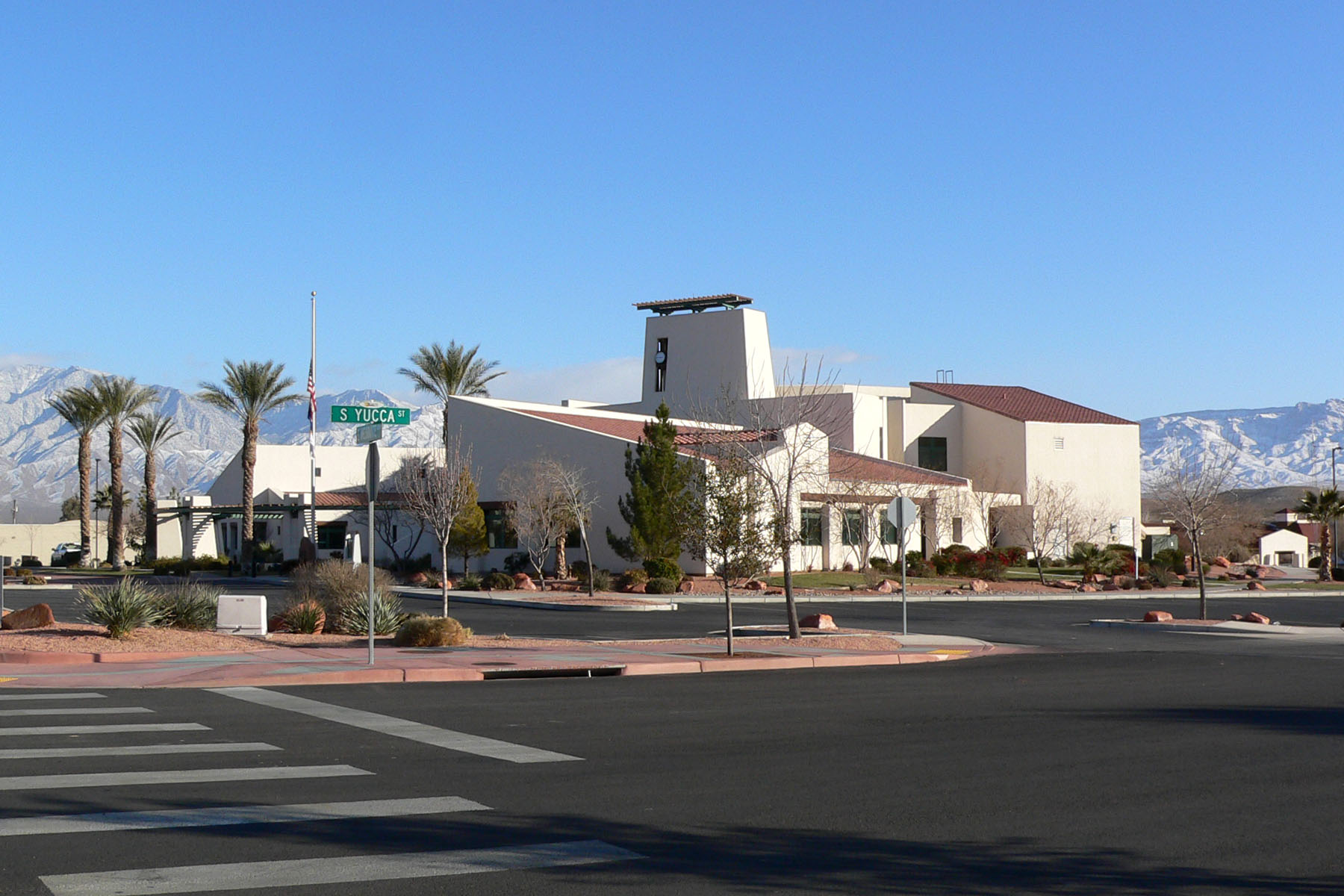
Mesquite City Hall

In 1987, the Virgin Valley's first newspaper, The Desert Echo, began distribution out of a local home on Riverside Road. The Desert Valley Times emerged by 1995, and The Desert Echo merged with The Desert Valley Times in 1998. Around 2000/2001, St. George–based The Spectrum (a Gannett newspaper) bought and distributed The Desert Valley Times. Moapa Valley based Mesa Valley Progress covers Virgin Valley and Moapa Valley news.

== Economy ==
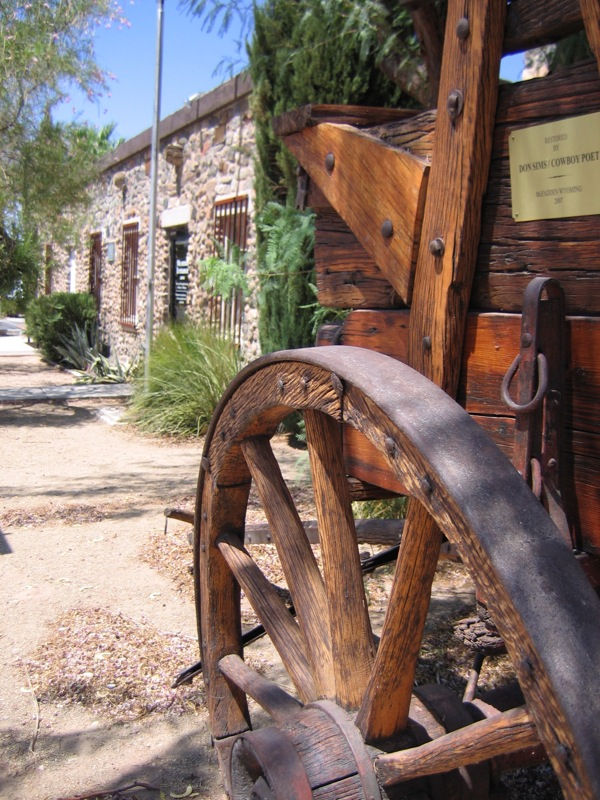
Virgin Valley Heritage Museum

Mesquite is home to several casinos, including the Virgin River Casino, CasaBlanca, Eureka, and Stateline Casino and Motel. The city also includes Rising Star Sports Ranch, a non-gaming hotel and sports facility. The Virgin Valley Heritage Museum has exhibits about area pioneers and local history. The museum building, built in 1940, is listed in the National Register of Historic Places. Mesquite is a stopping point for those traveling along the I-15 between Salt Lake City, Las Vegas, and Los Angeles. Mesquite is also a destination for year-round golf, with over nine public courses in the warm desert climate, it draws golfers from all over. Mesquite Airport provides facilities for general aviation and skydiving. It previously hosted the annual RE/MAX World Long Drive Championship until 2015.

== Notable people ==
- Cresent Hardy, politician
- Jerry Montgomery, football coach
- Stephen Paddock, mass shooter responsible for the 2017 Las Vegas Shooting
- Clark L. Reber, politician
- William Redd, businessman
