= Virgin Valley Heritage Museum =

- Desert Valley Museum
- U.S. National Register of Historic Places
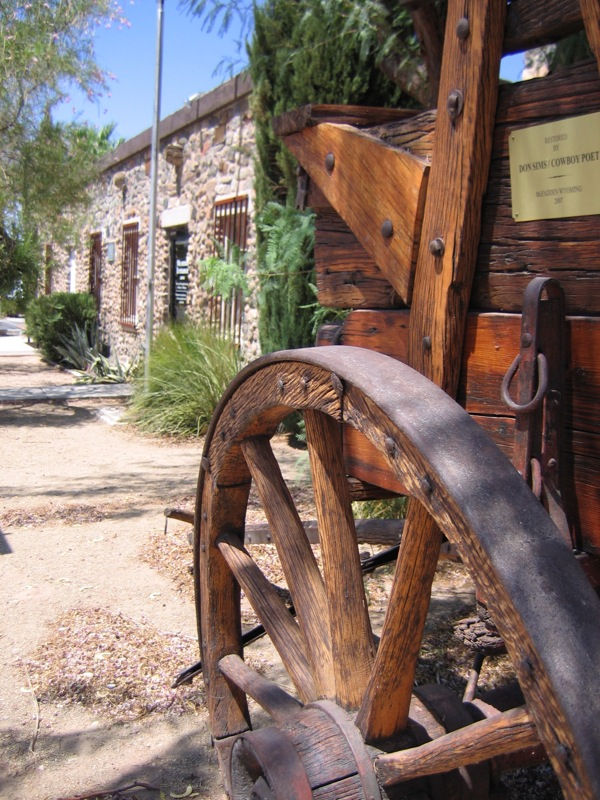
- Virgin Valley Heritage Museum

- Location within Nevada Location within the United States
- Location: 31 W. Mesquite Blvd., Mesquite, Nevada
- Coordinates: 36°48′15″N 114°4′5″W
- Area: less than one acre
- Architect: National Youth Administration; Walter Warren Hughes
- Architectural style: Late 19th And 20th Century Revivals, Vernacular Pueblo Revival
- NRHP reference No.: 91001527
- Added to NRHP: October 24, 1991

The Virgin Valley Heritage Museum, originally known as the Desert Valley Museum, is in Mesquite, Nevada and is listed on the United States National Register of Historic Places. The museum displays exhibits about area pioneers and local history.

== History ==
The building was designed by Walter Warren Hughes and built by the National Youth Administration in the Vernacular Pueblo Revival style.

Opened in 1940 as a library, it was converted around 1945 to a Southern Nevada Memorial Hospital branch. From 1977 to 1984, the building was used by the Boy Scouts of America for meetings.

It opened as the Desert Valley Museum on May 23, 1985. In July 2001, the name was changed to the Virgin Valley Heritage Museum.

The site was listed as a building in the National Register of Historic Places on October 24, 1991.

== Collection ==
The collection includes artifacts from about 1875 to 1935.
