= Black Gaming =

Black Gaming, LLC was a casino holding company that owned the CasaBlanca Resort and the Virgin River Casino in Mesquite, Nevada. It also owned the former Mesquite Star hotel-casino, which the company operated as a non-gaming convention center. The company headquarters were originally located in Summerlin, Nevada. The company also owned the Oasis resort in Mesquite.

== History ==
Black Gaming was owned by Randy Black Sr. The company opened its first hotel-casino, the Virgin River, in 1990.

In 2006 the company reorganized so that the casinos were owned wholly owned by "Casablanca LLC".

In December 2008, Black Gaming announced the partial closing of the Oasis Casino, with only the time-share units remaining. The casino was demolished in 2013.

In March 2010, Black Gaming filed for Chapter 11 bankruptcy protection in an effort to eliminate the majority of its debt.

In 2011 Black Gaming was diminished and Casablanca LLC was taken over by now CEO Anthony Toti to form Mesquite Gaming
