= CasaBlanca Resort =

Hotel and casino in Nevada, United States

Coordinates: 36.802619°N 114.100163°W

CasaBlanca
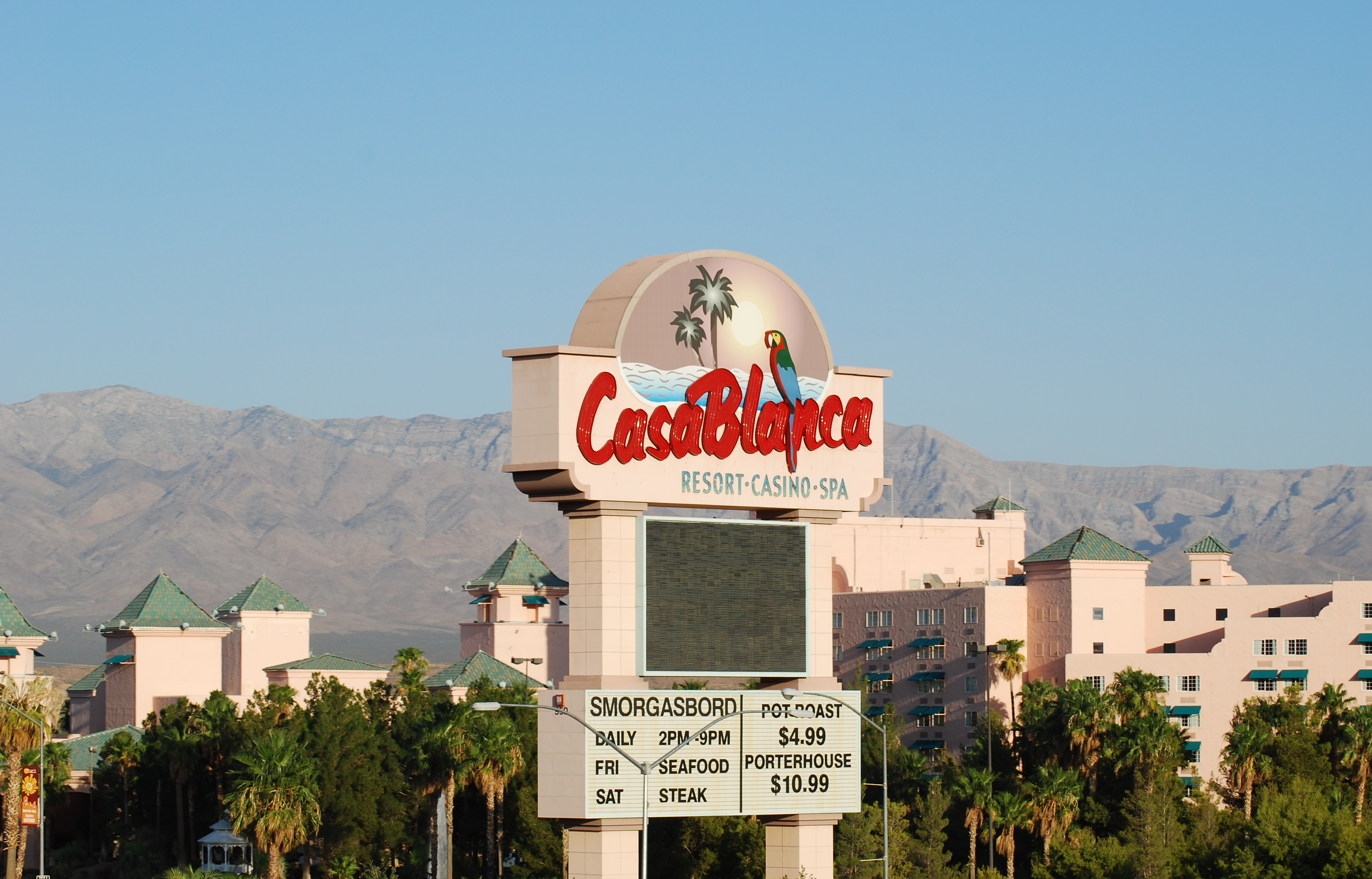
- Interactive map of CasaBlanca
- Location: Mesquite, Nevada, Nevada 89027; 950 West Mesquite Boulevard
- Opened: June 29, 1995; 31 years ago
- No. of rooms: 472
- Gaming space: 27,000 sq ft (2,500 m^{2})
- Signature attractions: CasaBlanca Golf Club
- Owner: Mesquite Gaming
- Previous names: Players Island (1995–97)
- Website: www.casablancaresort.com

CasaBlanca is a hotel, casino, and RV park located in Mesquite, Nevada. The resort, originally known as Players Island, was opened by Players International on June 29, 1995. After struggling financially, the resort was sold to Randy Black Sr., who renamed it as the CasaBlanca in July 1997. The resort, located on 42 acres (17 ha), includes 472 rooms, 24 timeshare units and a 45-space RV park.

== History ==
=== Players Island ===
The property was previously occupied by farmland, owned by Bryan Hafen. In May 1994, Hafen sold the site to Players International. A month later, the company announced plans to build a hotel-casino on the land. Players International had previously only operated riverboat casinos. Construction of the new resort, known as Players Island, began in the third quarter of 1994. The nine-story hotel was topped off in early 1995. Merv Griffin held a 12.4-percent interest in Players International, and he would also be in charge of producing a theatrical show for the new resort.

Players Island was built on 42 acres, and was completed ahead of schedule. The resort had an unadvertised early opening on June 29, 1995, to work out any issues prior to a publicized grand opening ceremony. Despite the lack of marketing, several hundred customers visited the resort for its early opening. An official grand opening took place on July 28, 1995. Players Island was the third resort to open in Mesquite, after the Oasis and Virgin River.

Players Island was themed after a tropical island, and included lawns, fountains, waterfalls, and palm trees. The resort exterior was pink in color. The property included 486 hotel rooms, and a 40,000 sq ft (3,700 m^{2}) casino with 850 slot machines, 29 table games, a sportsbook, and keno. The casino introduced new card games to the area such as mini-baccarat, Caribbean stud poker, and pai gow poker. Players Island also included several restaurants, convention space, and a spa offering mud baths. A 45-unit RV park and tennis courts were scheduled to open in August 1995, and a golf course was scheduled to open the following year. The $80 million resort was expected to employ as many as 900 people. There were plans to eventually expand the hotel to 1,500 rooms.

A 90-minute, family friendly show called Island Fever opened in August 1995. It was performed in the resort's Bali Hai Theater, which had seating for 425 people. In later years, the theater would offer seating for 550 people. A magic show was added in July 1996.

Early on, the resort was popular with its target clientele, which consisted of residents from Las Vegas and Utah. Marketing was later expanded to Colorado and southern California. Although initially popular, Players Island soon struggled financially. On average, the resort failed to keep 80 percent of its hotel rooms full, and free rooms were eventually offered to residents of Las Vegas and Salt Lake City. The local resort market was considered overbuilt, according to observers of the gaming industry. Players Island, with its spa and golf course, was also considered too upscale for the city and the motorists who traveled through it on Interstate 15.

In January 1997, Players International announced a preliminary agreement to sell the resort, at a loss, to Randy Black Sr. Black owned the Virgin River resort, and he had also made previous offers for Players Island. His latest offer was for $26 million, although Players International sought other buyers, hoping to get a better price. Two prospective buyers, Harrah's Entertainment and the comedian Gallagher, had reportedly made offers to purchase the resort. However, the preliminary sale agreement mandated that the resort be sold to someone within two months, as Players International was eager to work on other projects. This deadline deterred interested buyers, who did not have enough time to secure financing for a purchase. Hafen was among prospective buyers, although his bid was matched by Black. In March 1997, Players International agreed to sell the resort to Black for $30.5 million, still substantially less than what the company had invested in it.

=== CasaBlanca ===
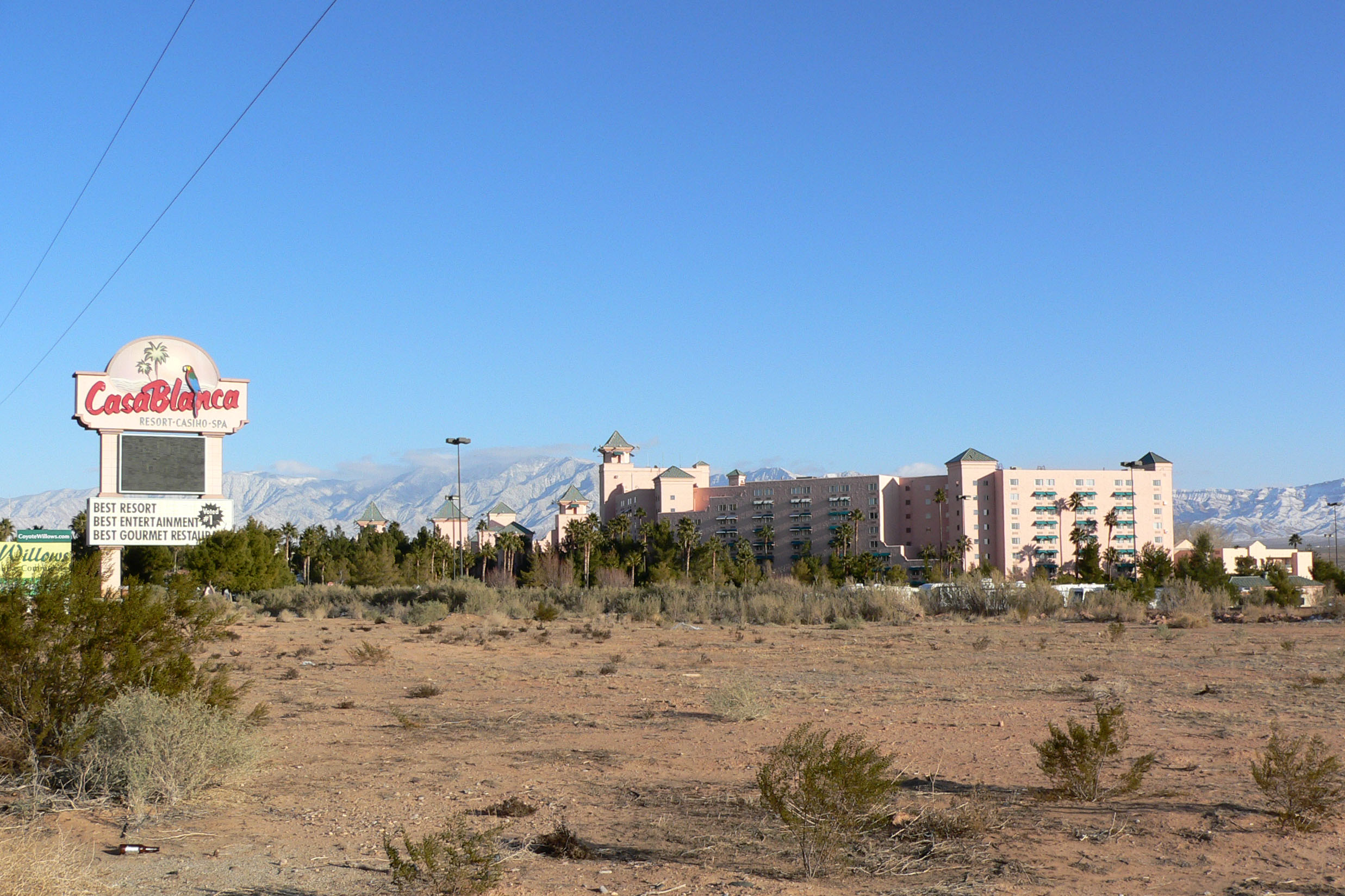
CasaBlanca in 2007

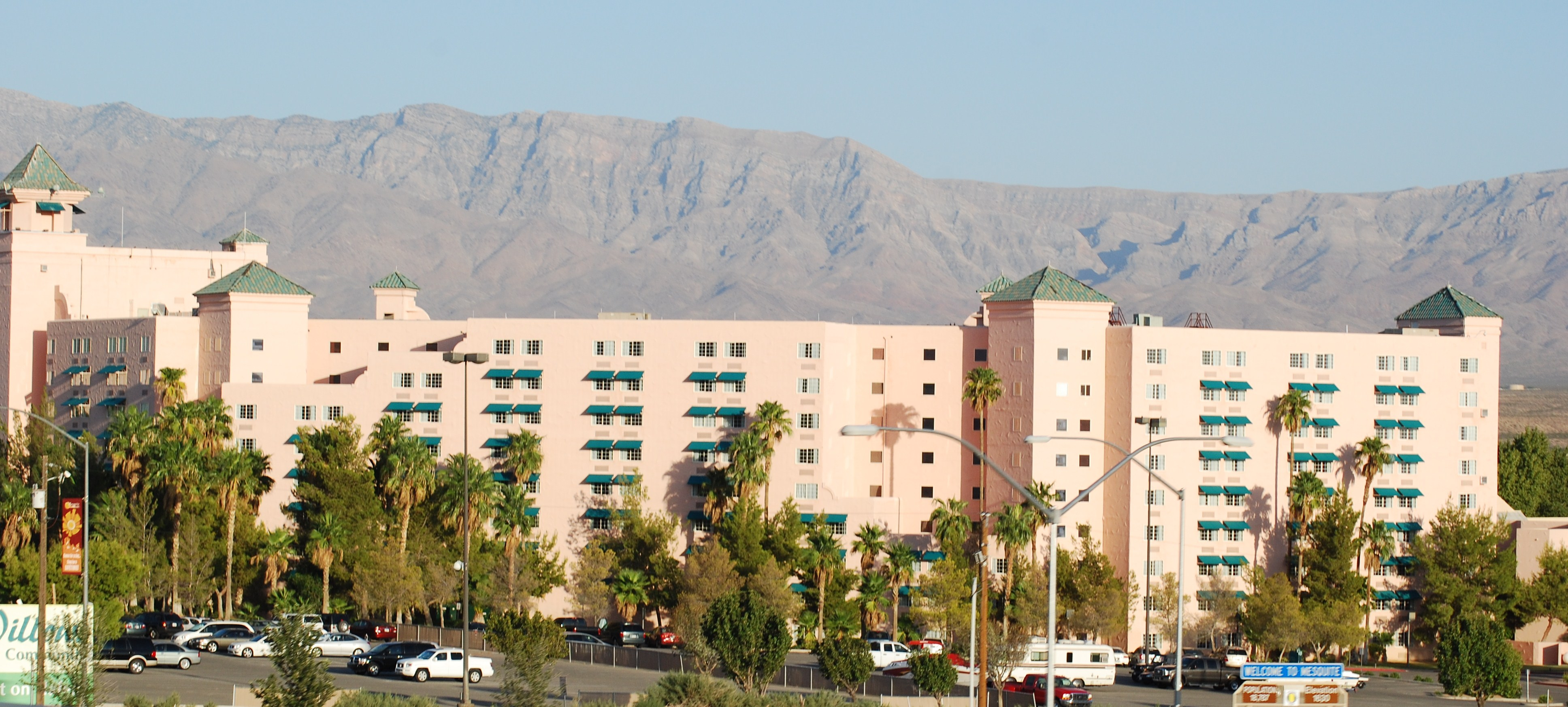
Hotel buildings in 2008

Black's purchase was finalized in June 1997, and he renamed the property as the CasaBlanca. The name change became effective on July 1, 1997. In 1998, undercover federal agents conducted Operation Casablanca, in which suspects were arrested for money laundering. Agents, posing as employees and owners of the CasaBlanca, invited the suspects to the resort and later arrested them. The operation's name was coincidental, having been chosen prior to the resort's name change in 1997.

In 2001, the CasaBlanca added 15 timeshare units.

On January 22, 2003, three-year-old Kristyanna Cowan was murdered at the CasaBlanca's RV park. The CasaBlanca later agreed to pay $5.5 million to a surviving victim of the attack.

Since 2008, the CasaBlanca Event Center has hosted the Golden Gloves junior boxing competitions. The resort has also hosted the Miss Nevada pageant, the annual "Smokin' in Mesquite" barbecue competition, and music festivals.

As of 2010, the hotel included 472 rooms. The resort also had 24 timeshare units, making up the CasaBlanca Vacation Club. Black filed for bankruptcy in 2011, and Mesquite Gaming was formed to take over his properties, including the CasaBlanca. It is the largest employer in Mesquite. The CasaBlanca advertises itself as being, "Like Vegas used to be."

== CasaBlanca Golf Club ==
The resort includes the CasaBlanca Golf Club, at 7,011 yards (6,411 m) par 72. It was built south of the resort, on property once used as an alfalfa field. The course is located beside the Virgin River, and was described as a tribute to Mother Nature. It was designed by Cal Olson. Construction for the course began in November 1995. It opened in October 1996, as part of Players Island. The CasaBlanca also operates a second nearby course, the Palms Golf Club.
