= Oasis (hotel and casino) =

Former hotel and casino in Mesquite, Nevada

- Interactive map of Oasis
- Location: Mesquite, Nevada; 897 West Mesquite Boulevard; 36°48′17″N 114°05′45″W
- Opened: 1960s
- Closed: December 2008 (various portions); 2010 (casino)
- No. of rooms: 900
- Gaming space: 33,557 sq ft (3,117.5 m^{2})
- Casino type: Land-based
- Previous names: Western Village Truck Stop; Peppermill Resort; Si Redd's Oasis
- Renovated in: 1984; 1995

Oasis was a hotel and casino located on 26 acres (11 ha) of land at 897 West Mesquite Boulevard in Mesquite, Nevada, adjacent to Interstate 15.

It began as the Western Village Truck Stop in the 1960s. William "Si" Redd purchased it in 1976 and renamed it five years later as Peppermill's Western Village. Until 1990, it was the only casino in Mesquite. It was renamed Si Redd's Oasis in 1993, later shortened to simply Oasis.

In 2001, Redd sold the Oasis to Randy Black Sr. and Black Gaming. Portions of the Oasis were closed in December 2008, due to financial losses. The Oasis' casino was closed in 2010, although the hotel was still used for overflow guests at Black Gaming's other Mesquite casinos. The Oasis was demolished in 2013.

== History ==
=== Early years and sale ===
The property began in the 1960s, as the Western Village Truck Stop, with 28 motel rooms and 23 slot machines. William "Si" Redd, who founded the slot machine company International Game Technology, purchased the struggling Western Village in 1976. It was renamed Peppermill's Western Village in 1981, and was also known as Peppermill Resort. An expansion was underway in 1984, adding 248 rooms. A new restaurant, gift shop and arcade were later added.

The Peppermill was the only casino in Mesquite until 1990, when the Virgin River opened. In 1993, the resort was renamed Si Redd's Oasis. The name Peppermill Oasis was also briefly used in the mid-1990s. A renovation was completed in 1995, which added a few hundred rooms to the hotel. By 1996, the Oasis' amenities included two nearby golf courses.

In October 1996, Redd turned over control of the Oasis to his son-in-law, Alan Green, who was named as president and sole director. Redd's daughters, Sarah Green and Vinnie Copeland, were named trustees of the William S. Redd Family Trust, which owned the property. By 1997, management had changed several times at the Oasis in recent years, which was seen as evidence of possible problems at the resort, including new competition. In December 1999, the Mesquite City Council was sued for its decision to deny the installation of a 99-foot sign advertising the resort's Oasis Casino Liquor Store.

In June 2001, employees at the Oasis had to reapply for their jobs at the resort when it was sold to Randy Black Sr. for $31 million, despite monopoly concerns; the Black family already owned two of the city's four casinos, and the Oasis gave them 91 percent of the city's casino hotel rooms, 85 percent of the city's table games, and 80 percent of the city's slot machines. Employees alleged that Black had lied to them and was planning to demote veteran employees and cut their salaries. Black claimed that he rehired 800 of the Oasis' 900 employees, and that any salary cuts would be caused by Mesquite market conditions. At the time, Redd said about the purchase, "I had lost touch with who I was -- my thing was tinkering with machines. I was never really a casino owner. The Oasis was a good idea and it was fun, but it never really was a money maker because it was not managed right." Black took possession of the Oasis on July 1, 2001.

=== Closure and demolition ===
The Oasis generated a negative income of $900,000 during the third quarter of 2008, while Black Gaming's revenues dropped 23 percent during the same period, both due to a decline in tourism. In November 2008, after defaulting on a loan, Black Gaming considered briefly closing one of its three casinos, but the company did not specify which one could close or when the closure could occur.

On December 1, 2008, Black Gaming announced plans to temporarily close the Oasis' casino, restaurants and night clubs on December 5, cutting 500 jobs as part of a bank agreement. The casino's 27 table games were closed on December 1, while other casino and restaurant operations would be gradually phased out by December 5. Restaurant operations were expected to cease on the night of December 5. Some slot machines were left operational at the resort's front counter to maintain a nonrestricted gaming license. Black said that "no assurances" could be made as to when the Oasis' facilities could reopen.

The resort's hotel, RV park, golf course, and gun club were expected to remain open, as well as its timeshare facilities: the 34-unit Grand Destinations Vacation Club and the 39-unit Peppermill Palms at Mesquite, a total of 73 units. On December 5, much of the 900-room hotel was closed, leaving only 100 rooms. The casino's number of slot machines was reduced from 750 to 144. The casino's Denny's restaurant, owned by a separate company, remained open as well. The Oasis was among the top three employers in Mesquite, along with Black Gaming's other two resorts. Ultimately, 347 employees were laid off.

In February 2009, Black Gaming's bank agreement was extended, allowing it to continue with reduced operations. That month, the Mesquite City Council extended the Oasis' gaming and liquor permits until July 31, 2009. In May 2009, Black Gaming closed a miniature golf course and go-kart track located on the property, and announced plans to close the Denny's restaurant on May 31, 2009.

During a 2010 Chapter 11 hearing, company officials considered demolition of the Oasis. On May 19, 2010, Randy Black Sr. said there was no timetable for demolition, and stated that the resort could reopen entirely if the local economy improved. At that time, 16 slot machines remained operational at the casino. The same day, Black Gaming announced plans to demolish the Oasis, which was considered an "outdated, inefficient property." Demolition was expected to begin in June 2010, with a cost of $1.1 million. At least 300 hotel rooms were expected to be kept and remain operational, depending on business conditions. No plans for the property's future had been decided at that time. Up to that point, the hotel, RV park, and convention facilities had been used only on an overflow basis for Black Gaming's other resorts when they were fully occupied.

In June 2010, Black Gaming announced plans to cease operations of its 16 slot machines, and announced that nearly 400 hotel rooms would remain after demolition. The casino closed that year. In July 2011, Mesquite Gaming LLC took over operations of Black Gaming's resorts, including the Oasis, which was still being used for hotel guest overflow. At that time, five timeshare units were being maintained, while the new company was considering a refurbishment of the property, contingent on an improving economy. Demolition began on May 4, 2013, and was scheduled to last three months. The casino, six hotel buildings, a spa building, a pool, and the go-kart track were expected to be demolished. Approximately 90 percent of demolished materials from the buildings were expected to be recycled and re-used.

Anthony Toti, chief executive officer of Mesquite Gaming, said the company would "start something very nice in a couple years" on the property. The Oasis' two timeshare buildings and its RV park were not demolished. A pedestrian bridge was also kept for future use. The site has since been used for annual events, including car shows and balloon festivals.

=== Incidents ===
On March 10, 1996, Butch Laswell, a stunt performer from nearby Logandale, died while performing a televised motorcycle stunt on a pedestrian bridge connected to the Oasis. The resort paid $100,000 to set up the stunt, which attracted 23,000 spectators.

In July 2000, an eight-year-old girl was sexually assaulted by a Utah man who lured her away from the resort's Family Fun Center Arcade. The girl's family sued the Oasis for a lack of adequate security in February 2001, seeking $5 million in punitive damages.

On the night of May 13, 2005, the Oasis was partially evacuated when a Utah man began firing gunshots inside a hotel room. After a two-hour standoff and several unsuccessful attempts to contact the man, police entered the room and found that the man had shot and killed himself.
