= Boomtown (disambiguation) =

A boomtown is a community that experiences sudden and rapid population and economic growth.

Boomtown or Boom Town may also refer to:

== Enterprises ==
- Boomtown, Inc., a former gaming company in Verdi, Nevada
- Boomtown Bossier City, a hotel and casino located in Louisiana (formerly known as Casino Magic Bossier City)
- Silverton (hotel and casino), formerly known as Boomtown Las Vegas
- Boomtown New Orleans, a hotel and casino located in Harvey, Louisiana (formerly known as Boomtown Westbank)
- Boomtown Reno, a hotel and casino located in Verdi, Nevada

== Music ==
- Boomtown Records, an Australian independent record label founded by Jaddan Comerford
- Boomtown (Andrew Cash album), the second studio album released by Canadian roots rock singer Andrew Cash
- Boomtown (David & David album), 1986
- Boomtown (Ozma album), the fifth studio album released by American rock band Ozma
- Boomtown (Toby Keith album), the second studio album released by American country music singer Toby Keith

== Film and television ==
- Boom Town (film), a 1940 adventure drama Hollywood film starring Clark Gable
- Boomtown (1956 TV series), an American weekend children's television program on WBZ-TV in Boston, Massachusetts
- "Boomtown", a 2000 episode of the Canadian-German science fiction television series Lexx
- Boomtown (2002 TV series), an American action/drama television series broadcast by NBC
- "Boom Town" (Doctor Who), a 2005 episode of the British science fiction television series Doctor Who
- Boom Town (2013 TV series), a British structured reality television series shown on BBC Three
- Boomtown, a recurring character from the television series Letterkenny

== Other uses ==
- Boomtown Historic District, a neighborhood in Martinsburg, West Virginia
- Boom Town (book), a 1998 picture book by Sonia Levitin
- Boomtown (festival) (formerly Boomtown Fair), an annual festival held near Winchester, United Kingdom
- Boomtown Film and Music Festival, in Southeast Texas
- Boomtown (podcast), 2019 audio documentary produced by Texas Monthly
- Boomtown (game), a 2004 board game
