= Ameristar Casino Resort Spa St. Charles =

Casino in Missouri, United States

Ameristar Casino St. Charles
- Interactive map of Ameristar Casino St. Charles
- Location: St. Charles, Missouri; 1 Ameristar Blvd; 38°46′00″N 90°29′15″W
- Opened: May 27, 1994
- No. of rooms: 400
- Gaming space: 130,000 sq ft (12,000 m^{2})
- Casino type: Riverboat
- Owner: Boyd Gaming
- Previous names: Station Casino St. Charles
- Website: AmeristarStCharles.com

Ameristar Casino Resort Spa St. Charles is a riverboat casino located on the Missouri River in St. Charles, Missouri, a northwestern suburb of St. Louis. It is one of several casinos in the greater St. Louis market. It is currently owned by Boyd Gaming. Ameristar attracts over 5.5 million visitors a year and is one of the most visited tourist attractions in Missouri.

== History ==
The casino opened on May 27, 1994, then owned by Station Casinos under the name Station Casino St. Charles. It was one of the first two riverboat casinos in the state, and originally offered 24,500 square feet of gaming space with 52 blackjack and craps tables and 813 video poker machines. The boat was formerly operating as the Casino Belle in Dubuque, Iowa. Due to regulations of that time, admission fees were charged, and gambling sessions were restricted to two-hour cruises with a $500 maximum loss per session. In late 1994, the casino was moved to a new boat, the Station Casino Belle. Cruising was required until 1996, when a change in regulations allowed riverboat casinos in Missouri to be permanently moored. For some time, two casinos were actually operating, one on the boat and another on a barge, until 1999, when the entire casino was consolidated to a barge, partially due to a regulation change which eliminated boarding restrictions. In October 2000, Station Casinos sold its Missouri properties, also including Station Casino Kansas City in the deal to Ameristar Casinos. In 2008, a major expansion of the property included a hotel, pool, and spa. In 2013, Ameristar Casinos was acquired by Pinnacle Entertainment. Pinnacle Entertainment was acquired by Penn National Gaming in 2018, but it chose to sell 4 of Pinnacle's properties, Ameristar Casino Kansas City, Belterra Casino Resort & Spa, Belterra Park and Ameristar St. Charles to Boyd Gaming to ensure regulatory approval. Many experts see a trend in casino consolidation, especially in markets such as Missouri, as a means of cutting costs.

== Property information ==
Ameristar St. Charles has over 130,000 square feet of gaming space, 400 hotel rooms, a pool, 7 restaurants, 12 bars, an entertainment venue, a spa, and 20,000 square feet of event space. Unlike Illinois casinos, it is open 24 hours a day except for Wednesdays, when the casino closes from 5am to 6am. The casino currently includes over 2,000 slot machines as well as table games and a poker room. Non-gaming amenities also include a Topgolf Swing Suite and an arcade.

== See also ==
- List of casinos in Missouri
