= Barton's Club 93 =

Hotel and casino in Nevada, United States

Coordinates: 41.9878°N 114.6719°W

- Interactive map of Barton's Club 93
- Location: Jackpot, Nevada, U.S.; 1002 U.S. Route 93
- Opened: 1957; 69 years ago
- No. of rooms: 102
- Gaming space: 12,550 sq ft (1,166 m^{2})
- Owner: Club 93, Inc.
- Website: Official website

Barton's Club 93 is a hotel and casino located in Jackpot, Nevada. It is the largest privately held property in Jackpot and one of the main competitors of the Penn Entertainment-operated Cactus Pete's and Horseshu Casino.

== History ==
Barton's Club 93 was founded in 1957at it's current location. The operation was expanded in the 1970s.

The name "Club 93" is a reference to U.S. Route 93, which is the main road in Jackpot and where the property is located.

== Casino ==
The casino features more than three hundred slot machines.

== See also ==
- List of casinos in Nevada
