= Pinnacle Entertainment (disambiguation) =

Pinnacle Entertainment may refer to:

- Pinnacle Entertainment, a defunct gaming and hospitality company based in the Las Vegas Valley, Nevada
- Pinnacle Entertainment (United Kingdom), a defunct entertainment group based in the United Kingdom
- Pinnacle Entertainment Group, an American publisher of role-playing games and wargames
