= Pinnacle Entertainment =

Former American gaming and hospitality company

Pinnacle Entertainment, Inc.
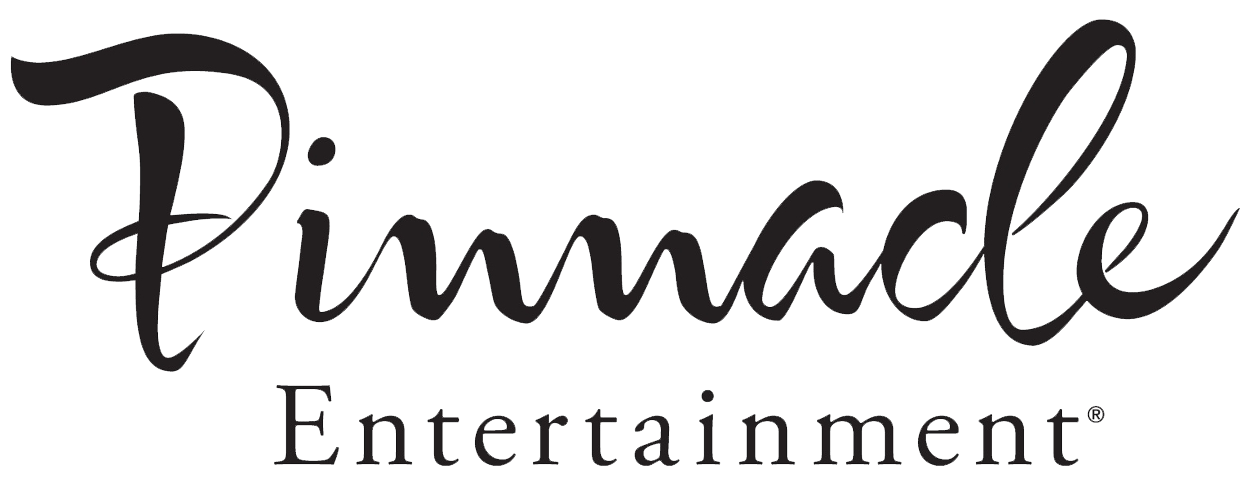
- Formerly: Hollywood Park Entertainment; (1938–1981); Hollywood Park Realty Enterprises; (1981–1992); Hollywood Park, Inc.; (1992–2000)
- Company type: Public
- Traded as: Nasdaq: PNK; Russell 2000 Component
- Industry: Hospitality; Gambling; Entertainment; Horse Racing; Restaurants; Hotels
- Founded: June 10, 1938; 88 years ago Inglewood, California, U.S.
- Founder: Jack L. Warner
- Defunct: October 15, 2018; 7 years ago
- Fate: Acquired by Penn National Gaming
- Headquarters: Spring Valley, Nevada, U.S.
- Key people: Anthony Sanfilippo (CEO)
- Revenue: ▲US$ 2.56 billion (2017)
- Operating income: ▲US$ 428.6 million (2017)
- Net income: ▲US$ 61.7 million (2017)
- Total assets: ▼US$ 3.95 billion (2017)
- Total equity: ▲US$ -321 million (2017)
- Number of employees: 15,377 (2017)

Pinnacle Entertainment, Inc. was an American gambling and hospitality company. It was acquired by Penn National Gaming in 2018. At the time of acquisition, it operated sixteen casino properties, located in Colorado, Indiana, Iowa, Louisiana, Mississippi, Missouri, Nevada, Pennsylvania, and Ohio, and a horse track in Texas.

== History ==
Pinnacle Entertainment traced its roots to June 10, 1938, when movie mogul Jack L. Warner opened the Hollywood Park Turf Club racetrack in Inglewood, California. The original shareholders included Hollywood figures such as Walt Disney, Mervyn LeRoy and Bing Crosby.

The company was incorporated and renamed in 1981 as Hollywood Park Realty Enterprises. It was renamed as Hollywood Park, Inc. in 1992.

After many years in the horse racing business, the company began a transformation into a casino operator. In 1997, the company acquired Boomtown, Inc. and its three casinos in Nevada, Louisiana and Mississippi for $188 million. In 1998, it acquired Casino Magic Corp. for $340 million, including two casinos in Mississippi, one in Louisiana and a controlling stake in two casinos in Argentina.

The company sold the Hollywood Park racetrack in 1999 to Churchill Downs, Inc. and in 2000 changed its name to Pinnacle Entertainment. Belterra Casino Resort & Spa made its debut in 2000 as Pinnacle's first company-designed and developed gaming resort. Then in 2005, Pinnacle opened L'Auberge du Lac in Lake Charles, Louisiana.

In September 2006, Pinnacle agreed to purchase the Sands Casino Hotel in Atlantic City, New Jersey and announced plans to replace it with a $1.5-billion resort. The property closed on November 11, 2006, and was demolished on October 18, 2007. Harsh economic times later caused Pinnacle to delay construction of the new resort. In February 2010, the company announced that it had canceled its construction plans and would instead seek to sell the land. Eventually it was sold in 2013 for $29.5 million to a group of local developers who planned to build a casino or family entertainment attraction.

In December 2006, Pinnacle purchased the President Casino in St. Louis, Missouri.

Lumière Place opened in downtown St. Louis in December 2007, anchoring an entertainment district including the Four Seasons Hotel St. Louis and HoteLumière. In March 2010, Pinnacle opened River City Casino, in Lemay, Missouri. Pinnacle announced the expansion of its L’Auberge Baton Rouge project in September 2010 and held a grand opening on September 1, 2012.

On November 9, 2009, chief executive officer Dan Lee was forced out by the company's board of directors after reportedly physically confronting and threatening a St. Louis County official. Anthony Sanfilippo was appointed as chief executive officer in March 2010.

In July 2010, the company sold its Argentina casinos for $40 million.

In January 2011, Pinnacle purchased River Downs Racetrack in southeast Cincinnati.

The company agreed in April 2012 to buy a 75.5% stake in Retama Park, a money-losing horse track in Selma, Texas, for $22.8 million. The purchase was seen as a "defensive move" to help soften the blow if gaming in Texas were expanded and drew visitors away from Pinnacle's Lake Charles properties.

In May 2011, Pinnacle expanded into the Asian gaming market with a $95-million investment for 26 percent ownership of Asian Coast Development Ltd., the owner and developer of the Ho Tram Strip, 80 miles away from Ho Chi Minh City in southern Vietnam, which will be the country's first large-scale integrated destination resort. Upon the closing of the transaction, Pinnacle would enter into a management agreement through 2058 for the second integrated resort on the Ho Tram Strip.

On June 26, 2012, Pinnacle sold Boomtown Reno for $12.9 million to M1 Gaming, the company of former Station Casinos executive Dean DiLullo.

On August 14, 2013, Pinnacle bought Ameristar Casinos for $869 million plus $1.9 billion in assumed debt, adding nine properties in Colorado, Indiana, Iowa, Missouri, Mississippi and Northern Nevada. To gain FTC approval for the merger, Pinnacle agreed to sell its Lumiere Place property and Ameristar's under-construction casino in Lake Charles.

In November 2014, Pinnacle announced a plan to spin-off a real estate investment trust with the real estate assets of its 15 casinos. Gaming and Leisure Properties (GLPI) then approached Pinnacle with an offer to buy those assets, which it said would be simpler and faster than Pinnacle's plan. Pinnacle did not respond to the offer, so GLPI went public with its offer in March 2015. In July, the companies reached a deal for GLPI to buy 14 of Pinnacle's 15 properties for $4.75 billion in stock, and lease them back to Pinnacle, with rent starting at $377 million per year. The sale would be executed by Pinnacle spinning off a new company, also named Pinnacle Entertainment, with the casinos' operating businesses, along with ownership of Belterra Park (formerly River Downs) and the company's interest in Retama Park; GLPI would then acquire the original Pinnacle Entertainment. The sale was completed in April 2016. Pinnacle also purchased the operations of The Meadows Racetrack and Casino in Pennsylvania from GLPI for $138 million in September 2016.

In December 2017, Pinnacle agreed to be acquired by Penn National Gaming for $2.8 billion in cash and stock. To ensure regulatory approval for the deal, Pinnacle would sell the operations of four properties to Boyd Gaming for $575 million prior to the merger: Ameristar Kansas City, Ameristar St. Charles, Belterra Casino, and Belterra Park. The real estate of Belterra Park was originally to be sold to GLPI, but was ultimately sold to Boyd for $58 million. The transactions were completed on October 15, 2018.

== Resorts and casinos ==
At the time of its acquisition, the company operated the following properties:

- Ameristar Casino Council Bluffs – Council Bluffs, Iowa
- Ameristar Casino Hotel East Chicago – East Chicago, Indiana
- Ameristar Casino Vicksburg – Vicksburg, Mississippi
- Ameristar Casino Hotel Kansas City – Kansas City, Missouri
- Ameristar Casino Resort Spa Black Hawk – Black Hawk, Colorado
- Ameristar Casino Resort Spa St. Charles – St. Charles, Missouri
- Belterra Casino Resort & Spa – Florence, Indiana
- Belterra Park Gaming & Entertainment Center – Cincinnati, Ohio
- Boomtown Bossier City – Bossier City, Louisiana
- Boomtown New Orleans – Harvey, Louisiana
- Cactus Petes Resort Casino – Jackpot, Nevada
- Horseshu Hotel and Casino – Jackpot, Nevada
- L'Auberge Casino & Hotel Baton Rouge – Baton Rouge, Louisiana
- L'Auberge Casino Resort Lake Charles – Lake Charles, Louisiana
- The Meadows Racetrack and Casino – North Strabane Township, Pennsylvania
- Retama Park – Selma, Texas (75% stake)
- River City Casino – St. Louis, Missouri

=== Previous operations ===
==== Argentina ====
- Casino Magic Neuquén (sold)
- Casino Magic San Martin de los Andes (sold)

==== United States ====
- Boomtown Biloxi – Biloxi, Mississippi (sold)
- Boomtown Las Vegas – Enterprise, Nevada (sold; now Silverton Las Vegas)
- Boomtown Reno – Verdi, Nevada (sold)
- Casino Magic Bay St. Louis – Bay St. Louis, Mississippi (sold)
- Casino Magic Biloxi – Biloxi, Mississippi (closed and sold; now Margaritaville Resort Biloxi)
- Hollywood Park Racetrack – Inglewood, California (sold)
- Lumière Place – St. Louis, Missouri (sold)
- President Casino Laclede's Landing – St. Louis, Missouri (closed)
