= Peter Piersanti =

American businessman

- Born: Peter Vincent Piersanti; November 3, 1916; Superior, Wyoming, USA
- Died: February 15, 1994 (aged 77); Lake Tahoe, Nevada, USA
- Known for: Considered the main founder of Jackpot, Nevada. Owned two Nevada casinos

Peter Vincent Piersanti (November 3, 1916 – February 15, 1994), sometimes known as Cactus Pete, was an American hotel and casino promoter active in Idaho and Nevada from the 1940s to the 1980s. He is credited as one of the main founders of the community of Jackpot, Nevada, in the 1950s. He is namesake of two Nevada casinos he owned at different points in his career, Cactus Pete's casino in Jackpot and Cactus Jack's Casino in Carson City.

== Early life ==
Piersanti was born in Superior, Wyoming, the youngest of six children. His parents were Italian immigrants. His family later moved to Ogden, Utah. While in Ogden in 1941, Piersanti purchased a local bar and grill with a card room and a pinball machine distribution company. In 1943, Piersanti enlisted in the United States Army and served during World War II.

== Career ==
After the war Piersanti and his family were among the original owners of the Island Park Lodge in Island Park, Idaho, which opened in 1947. The property featured several slot machines owned by Piersanti.

In 1954 the State of Idaho outlawed all forms of gambling. In response Piersanti moved his slot machine operation from Island Park to a site just south of the Idaho border on U.S. Route 93 in what was then considered a part of Contact, Nevada, in Elko County. The opening of Piersanti's establishment, Cactus Pete's Motor Lodge, was instrumental in the founding of the town of Jackpot.

Originally a gas station with slot machines, by 1958, Cactus Pete's was so successful that a 15-room hotel and aircraft runway were built to accommodate the growing numbers of visitors, mainly from nearby Idaho. Cactus Pete's was incorporated by Piersanti and others in 1956. This corporation is considered the forerunner of Ameristar Casinos, which currently owns the Cactus Pete's property.

Piersanti sold his interest in Cactus Pete's in 1971. After a brief stay in Las Vegas, in 1971, he bought the Senator Club in Carson City and renamed it Cactus Jack's Senator Club. Piersanti remained active in the Carson City gaming community until his retirement in 1989. During his final years he lived in the Lake Tahoe area.

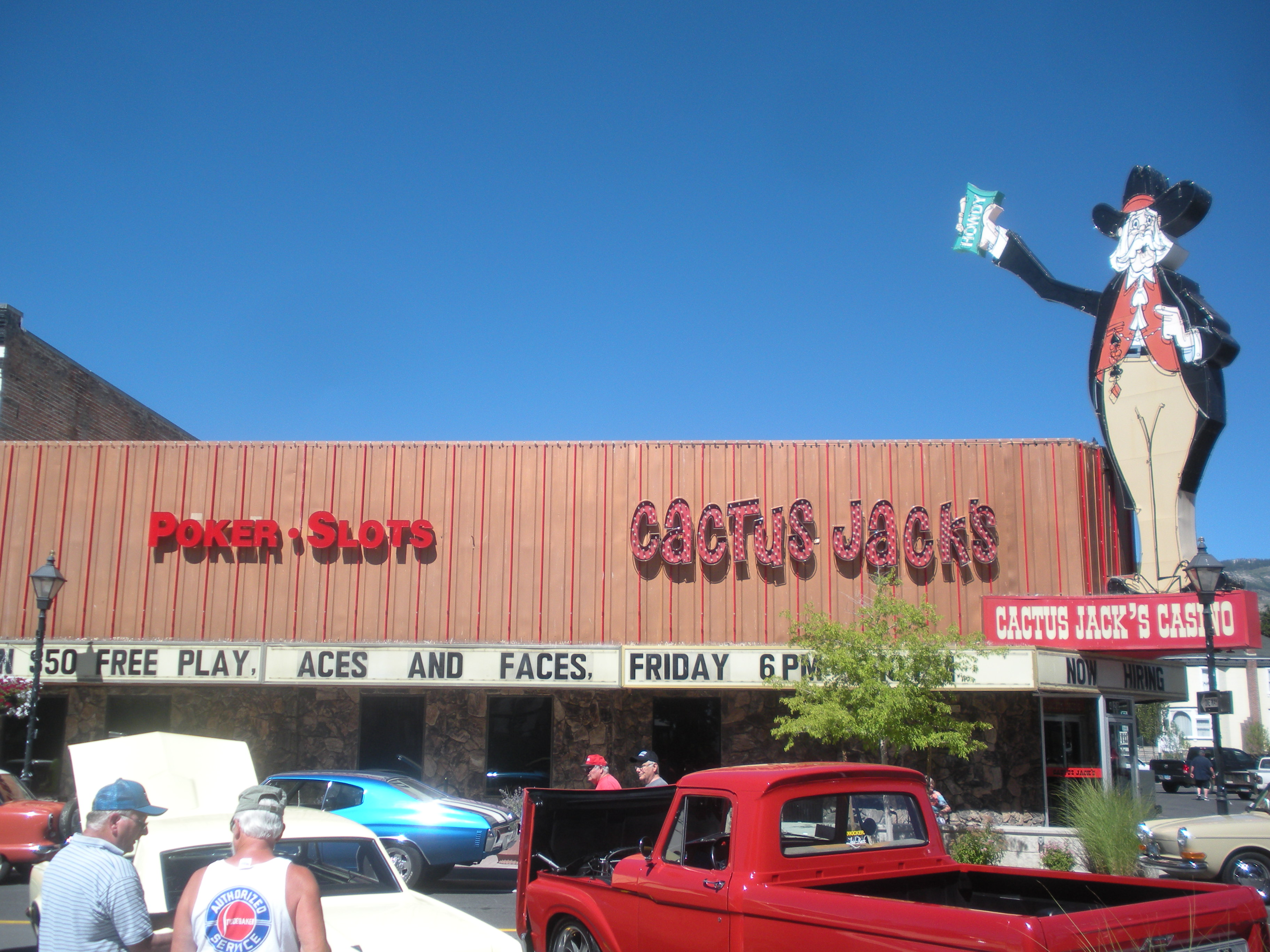
Cactus Jack's Casino

In addition to the casinos, Piersanti Drive in Jackpot is named after Piersanti. In 2001 Piersanti was featured on a $5 casino token issued by Cactus Jack's Casino as part of a series honoring Nevada gaming pioneers.
