= Casino Magic Corp. =

Gaming company from Mississippi, US

- Industry: Gambling/entertainment
- Defunct: 1998
- Fate: Acquired by Hollywood Park
- Headquarters: Bay St. Louis, Mississippi, U.S.

Casino Magic Corp. was a gaming company based in Bay St. Louis, Mississippi. It was acquired in 1998 by Hollywood Park, Inc. (now Pinnacle Entertainment) for $340 million, snubbing an offer of $310 million from Grand Casinos.

== List of properties ==
- Casino Magic Bay St. Louis — Bay St. Louis, Mississippi
- Casino Magic Biloxi — Biloxi, Mississippi
- Casino Magic Bossier City — Bossier City, Louisiana
- Casino Magic Neuquén — Neuquén, Argentina
- Casino Magic San Martín de los Andes — San Martín de los Andes, Argentina
