= Ameristar Casinos =

Casino operator based in Paradise, Nevada

Ameristar Casinos, Inc.
- Type: Public
- Traded as: Nasdaq: ASCA
- Industry: Gaming and hospitality
- Founded: 1954; 72 years ago, in Jackpot, Nevada
- Founder: Cactus Pete Piersanti
- Defunct: 2013 (acquisition completed)
- Fate: Acquired
- Successor: Pinnacle Entertainment
- Headquarters: Paradise, Nevada, United States
- Key people: Gordon Kanofsky (CEO) Larry A. Hodges (president & COO)
- Revenue: $1.22B (FY 2009)
- Operating income: $104M (FY 2009)
- Net income: $-4.67M (FY 2009)
- Total assets: $2.21B (FY 2009)
- Total equity: $336M (FY 2009)
- Number of employees: 7,100

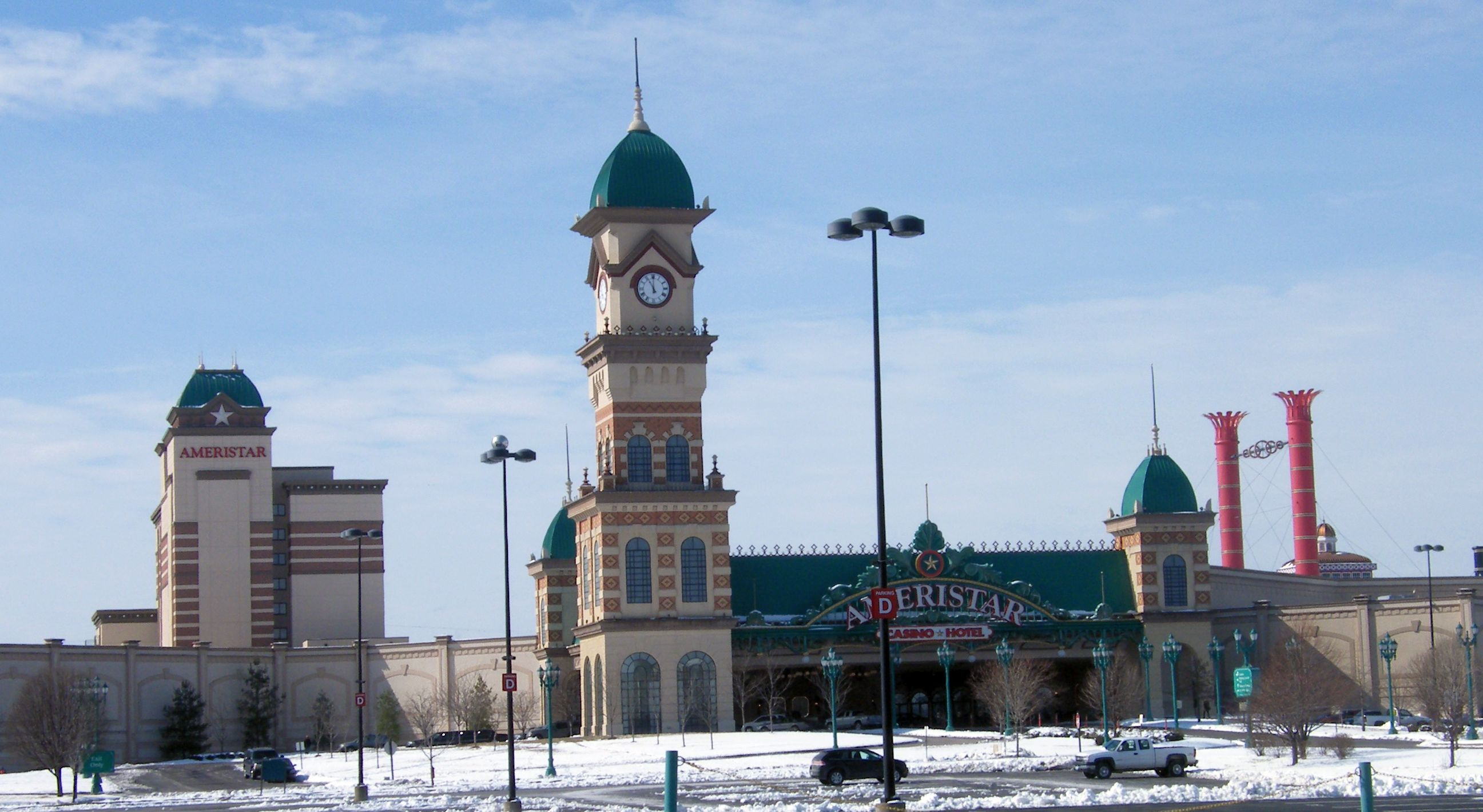
Ameristar Casino in Kansas City

Ameristar Casinos, Inc. was a casino operator based in Paradise, Nevada. It was acquired by Pinnacle Entertainment in 2013. The company had eight properties in seven markets.

== History ==
The roots of Ameristar Casinos date to 1954, when "Cactus Pete" Piersanti opened Cactus Petes Desert Lodge on U.S. Route 93 just south of the Idaho border in Elko County. The area would later become Jackpot, Nevada. In 1956, Piersanti and others incorporated the property as Cactus Petes, Inc.

The corporation took over management of the neighboring Horseshu Club in 1964. Cactus Petes came under the partial control of Ray Neilsen of Twin Falls, Idaho, in 1967. Neilsen's construction company had built many of the structures at Cactus Pete's. Neilsen's son, Craig, assumed control of day-to-day operations upon the elder Neilsen's death in 1971. Craig H. Neilsen became sole owner in 1984.

A November 1985 automobile accident left Craig H. Neilsen a quadriplegic, but he continued to lead and expand the company. Neilsen was named "Best Performing CEO" by the American Gaming Association in 2002, and was inducted into the organization's "Hall of Fame" in 2005. Craig H. Neilsen remained chairman and CEO until his unexpected death on November 19, 2006.

Ray H. Neilsen succeeded his father, serving as co-chairman with John Boushy, who was also promoted from president to CEO at the time of Craig's death. Boushy resigned in June 2008 and was succeeded by Gordon Kanofsky, who previously served as the company's executive vice president and now holds the dual roles of CEO and vice chairman. Ray H. was named chairman at the same time.

In August 2013, Pinnacle Entertainment bought Ameristar for $869 million plus $1.9 billion in assumed debt. The company had reportedly been "on the sales block" since Craig Neilsen's death.

== Expansion ==
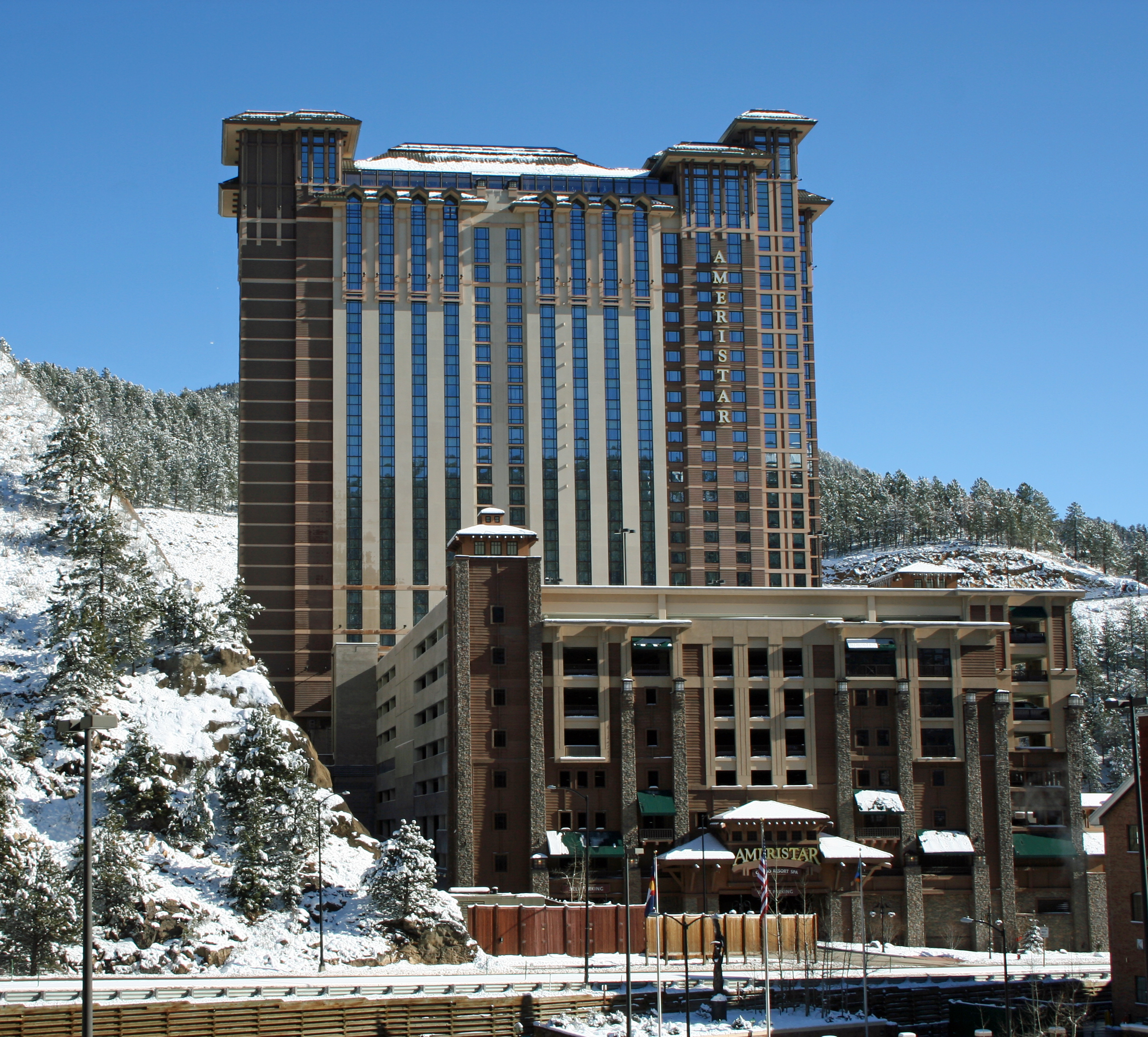
The Ameristar Resort Casino Spa, opened October 2009, in Black Hawk, Colorado

In 1992 the company made its first investment outside of Jackpot by acquiring a Vicksburg, Mississippi, property known as Delta Pointe. This property was opened in 1994 as Ameristar Casino Vicksburg. The company subsequently constructed an adjoining hotel and, in 2008, completed a $100 million expansion of the facility. Ameristar opened the first of several riverboat casinos in Council Bluffs, Iowa, in 1996. In 1998, the company opened the Reserve Hotel Casino in Henderson, Nevada.

The company was renamed Ameristar Casinos, Inc., and went public in 1993 on the Nasdaq under the ticker symbol "ASCA." Company headquarters were moved from Twin Falls to Las Vegas in 1996.

In 2000, Ameristar purchased properties in Kansas City, Missouri, and St. Charles, Missouri, from Station Casinos, Inc., and in 2001, sold The Reserve Hotel and Casino to Station Casinos, which renamed it Fiesta Henderson.

In 2004, Ameristar acquired the Mountain High Casino in Black Hawk, Colorado. In 2006, the Ameristar brand debuted after an $80 million renovation and expansion project that included additional covered parking; and announced details of its planned 33-story hotel and spa. Ameristar officially opened its new Casino Resort Spa complex in October 2009 to become the first destination resort casino in Colorado. The property's $230 million expansion included a 33-story luxury hotel and day spa, an enclosed rooftop swimming pool, and 15,000 square feet (1,400 m^{2}) of meeting and event space. The 33-story hotel, which contains 536 rooms and 64 suites, became the tallest structure between Salt Lake City, Utah, and Denver.

Ameristar also completed the acquisition of the Resorts East Chicago casino in East Chicago, Indiana from Resorts International Holdings in 2007. It was rebranded Ameristar Casino Hotel East Chicago in June 2008. An outdoor summer concert series promoted the rebranding, and featured Lionel Richie, Smokey Robinson and Reba McEntire.

In 2010, Ameristar announced plans to renovate all of Ameristar East Chicago's 280 superior guest rooms and 10 luxury suites; and to add 100 rooms and a fitness center to Ameristar Kansas City's existing luxury hotel. The addition will complement the property's existing 184 rooms and hotel lobby, which were extensively renovated in September 2006.

In Massachusetts, where casinos were legalized in November 2011, Ameristar applied for the one gaming license allotted to Western Massachusetts, proposing to build a $910 million hotel and casino. It acquired a 41-acre site in East Springfield, a former Westinghouse plant, for $16 million. In November 2012, however, Ameristar withdrew its proposal in the face of competing bids from MGM Resorts International and Penn National Gaming, saying that city officials were more likely to endorse a downtown casino.

In March 2012, Ameristar agreed to acquire Creative Casinos, the developer of the proposed Mojito Pointe casino resort in Lake Charles, Louisiana, for $32.5 million. Ameristar planned to spend at least $500 million on the resort and open it in mid-2014.

== Philanthropy ==
Following the death of Craig H. Neilsen, his estate endowed the foundation in his name. Ameristar regularly partners with the Craig H. Neilsen Foundation to support the rehabilitation of individuals suffering from spinal cord injuries and disease. Ray H. Neilsen serves as chairman and co-trustee with Kanofsky. In addition, Ameristar was one of the first companies to help fund research at the Nevada Cancer Institute by making a $500,000 donation in 2004.

Ameristar also sponsors an active workplace giving campaign known as Ameristar Cares. In 2012, the company and its employees raised almost $7 million for charitable organizations.

== Financial ==
Although the 2008–2009 economic recession hurt the financial performance of casinos on the Las Vegas Strip, Ameristar and other regional casino operators fared better as customers opted for gaming and entertainment destinations closer to home.

Ameristar's properties in Kansas City and St. Charles, Missouri, and Black Hawk, Colorado, benefitted from casino-related regulatory reform approved by voters in 2008–09. In Missouri, voters repealed the state's loss limit, which had capped players' purchases of table game chips and slot machine credits at $500 every two hours. In Black Hawk, voters approved a measure that increased betting limits and operating hours and added the games of craps and roulette.

== Casinos ==
Ameristar's properties at the time it was acquired were:

- Ameristar Casino Council Bluffs — Council Bluffs, Iowa
- Ameristar Casino Hotel East Chicago — East Chicago, Indiana
- Ameristar Casino Vicksburg — Vicksburg, Mississippi
- Ameristar Casino Hotel Kansas City — Kansas City, Missouri
- Ameristar Casino Resort Spa Black Hawk — Black Hawk, Colorado
- Ameristar Casino Resort Spa Lake Charles — Lake Charles, Louisiana (under construction)
- Ameristar Casino Resort Spa St. Charles — St. Charles, Missouri
- Cactus Petes Resort Casino — Jackpot, Nevada
- Horseshu Hotel and Casino — Jackpot, Nevada
