= Ed Roski Jr. =

American businessman and philanthropist

- Born: 1938 (age 87–88); Oklahoma, United States
- Education: University of Southern California
- Occupation: Businessman
- Known for: Real estate development

Edward P. Roski Jr. (born 1938) is an American businessman and philanthropist. As a billionaire and president of Majestic Realty, he appeared at #199 on the Forbes 400 in 2025. He owns more than 83 million square feet of real estate in the United States as a business park developer through his company. Roski has served as its president since 1994, and previously as the executive vice-president and chief operating officer, from 1978 to 1994. He is a partial owner of the Los Angeles Kings, and the Los Angeles Lakers, and owns the Silverton Las Vegas. He is also a decorated veteran of the Vietnam War and art collector.

== Early life and education ==
Roski was born in 1938, in Oklahoma. His father Ed Roski Sr., was the son of a poor immigrant family from Poland who did not finish high school. Roski Sr. served in the United States Navy during World War II, then moved the family to Southern California, where he founded Majestic Realty in 1948. Roski Jr. attended Loyola High School in Los Angeles, and graduated from the University of Southern California in 1962, with a bachelor's degree in real estate and finance. He joined Majestic Realty in 1966.

== United States Marine Corps ==
Roski enrolled in the United States Marine Corps after graduating in 1962. After attending The Basic School at Marine Corps Base Quantico, he reported to the First Marine Brigade, and was later assigned to 1st Battalion, 4th Marines. In 1965, Roski was deployed from Marine Corps Air Station Kaneohe Bay to South Vietnam. He was wounded in Chu Lai during Operation Starlite, and was awarded a Bronze Star Medal and two Purple Hearts.

In 2000, General James L. Jones and the Marine Corps Scholarship Foundation honored Roski with its Semper Fidelis award. In 2007, Roski founded the Land of the Free Foundation to support war veterans and families, and he has contributed more than $10 million to its efforts. In October 2017, Roski earned the Circle of Honor Award from the Congressional Medal of Honor Foundation.

== Professional sports teams ==
Roski became a minority owner of the Los Angeles Kings in 1995 and a minority owner of the Los Angeles Lakers in 1998. Roski and Philip Anschutz were majority owners of the Los Angeles Arena Company, looking to replace the Great Western Forum for the Kings, and exercised an option to buy 25% of the Lakers, with the Lakers agreeing to become a tenant in the planned arena. During his minority ownership, the Lakers won NBA Championships in 2000, 2001, 2002, 2009, 2010 and 2020; and the Kings won the Stanley Cup in 2012 and 2014.

Roski proposed a stadium in the Los Angeles suburb of the City of Industry for a National Football League team. In 2010, the California legislature passed a bill that gave Roski an exemption to environmental review for the $800 million stadium proposal. The deal was not completed, due to the announcement of the SoFi Stadium instead. Roski was also part of a $1 billion project to build Allegiant Stadium for the relocated Oakland Raiders and the UNLV Rebels football teams, but later pulled out of the project.

== Philanthropy ==
Roski has served as chairman and a trustee on the University of Southern California board of directors. In 2006, he and his wife donated $23 million for its fine arts school, since renamed the USC Roski School of Art and Design. In 2016, Roski and his wife donated $25 million to the eye institute at the Keck School of Medicine of USC. Roski set up the Majestic Realty Foundation in 2002, a community outreach program focusing on youth, family, education, health and violence prevention. The foundation makes grants of over $2 million annually.

== Personal life ==
Roski was married to Gayle Garner Roski until her death on October 21, 2020. They had three children, and resided in Toluca Lake, Los Angeles.

Roski has bicycled across Ireland, Mongolia, Myanmar, and Russia. He has visited the wreck of the RMS Titanic in a Russian submersible, and gone deep diving in waters off New Guinea. His Mountaineering ventures include base camp at Mount Everest, K2, and Mount Kilimanjaro. He purchased ticket #128 on Virgin Galactic's SpaceShipTwo.

Roski is an honorary director of The Explorers Club, and is part of the National Geographic Society executive committee. He has served on the boards of directors for the Los Angeles County Museum of Art, the Bowers Museum, the California Science Center, the Natural History Museum of Los Angeles County, the House Ear Institute, and Loyola High School. Roski is a collector of African art, Indigenous Australian art, and Indigenouisms from Oceania. He donated the "Spirits and Headhunters" exhibit, on display at the Bowers Museum.
