= Retama Park =

Horse racing track in Texas

Coordinates: 29.585°N 98.315°W

- Interactive map of Retama Park
- Location: Selma, Texas
- Owned by: Retama Development Corp.
- Operated by: Penn Entertainment
- Date opened: April 7, 1995
- Race type: Quarter Horse
- Course type: Dirt and turf(turf not currently in use)

Retama Park is a class 1 pari-mutuel horse racetrack located in Selma, Texas, United States, that opened in 1995. Live quarter horse races meet July to September. Simulcast racing is shown year-round. The track is owned by the Retama Development Corporation (a quasi-governmental entity formed by the City of Selma) and managed by Penn Entertainment.

== History ==
The Retama Development Corporation was formed in the early 1990s to issue bonds to finance the track's construction and to act on behalf of Selma to oversee the racetrack's construction and operations. Retama Park held it first race on April 7, 1995, 1 and 1/2 years behind schedule.

Retama park last held a Thoroughbred meet in 2019 and in 2021 held a 20-day quarter horse meet. In 2023 they planned to have a 23-day QH meet starting June 29 but were forced to cancel due to a critical power outage, resulting in the park's cancellation of evening horse races, as well as races scheduled for the following day. On June 5, Amy Cook of the Texas Racing Commission sent Retama's management a notice of unsafe conditions and a list of matters to address before they resumed live racing. On July 18, Cook sent the following letter, allowing live racing to resume. “We are confident that the Penn Entertainment, the racetrack association managing Retama Park, is committed to compliance with the Texas Racing Act, and the safety of the betting public and racing industry participants.” Retama ended up completing a 23-day QH meet from July 19 to September 2.

Retama scheduled a 23-day quarter horse meet going from June 27 to August 17 for 2024.

=== Financial problems ===
Retama Park has never turned a profit. The RDC filed for Chapter 9 bankruptcy protection in March 1996. Call Now, Inc., a publicly traded long-distance phone company bought over 90% of the bonds issued for construction of the track and allowed the track to emerge from bankruptcy and continue operation. Call Now failed in 2011, and the track was in danger of foreclosure from Call Now's creditors but was granted a forbearance instead. In 2013, Pinnacle Entertainment purchased a 75.5% equity stake in Retama Partners, Ltd., the owner of the racing license for Retama Park, for $22.8 million, averting another bankruptcy filing for the RDC. Pinnacle also took over operations of the track under a management agreement with the RDC.

In 2018, Penn National Gaming (now Penn Entertainment) acquired Pinnacle and assumed management of the track.
