= Jackpot Airport =

Airport in Nevada, United States

Jackpot Airport Hayden Field
- IATA: KPT; ICAO: none; FAA LID: Ø6U

Summary
- Airport type: Public
- Owner: Elko County
- Serves: Jackpot, Nevada
- Elevation AMSL: 5,224 ft (1,592 m)
- Coordinates: 41°58′33″N 114°39′29″W

Map
- Location of airport in Nevada Ø6U (the United States)

Runways
Direction	Length		Surface
Direction	ft	m	Surface
15/33	6,180	1,884	Asphalt

Statistics (2023)
- Aircraft operations (year ending 5/31/2023): 4,000
- Based aircraft: 0
- Source: Federal Aviation Administration

Jackpot Airport (IATA: KPT, FAA LID: Ø6U), also known as Hayden Field, is a county-owned, public-use airport located east of Jackpot, in Elko County, Nevada, United States. The National Plan of Integrated Airport Systems for 2011–2015 categorized it as a general aviation facility.

== Facilities and aircraft ==
The facility covers an area of 325 acres (132 ha) at an elevation of 5,224 feet (1,592 m) above mean sea level. It has one runway designated 15/33 with an asphalt surface measuring 6,180 by 60 feet (1,884 x 18 m).

For the 12-month period ending May 31, 2023, the airport had 4,000 aircraft operations, an average of 77 per week; 82% general aviation, and 18% military. At that time there were no aircraft based at this airport.

== See also ==
- List of airports in Nevada
