= Boomtown, Inc. =

- Industry: Gaming & hospitality
- Founded: 1988; 38 years ago
- Defunct: July 1, 1997; 28 years ago
- Fate: Acquired by Hollywood Park, Inc.
- Headquarters: Verdi, Nevada

Boomtown, Inc. was an American gaming company founded in 1988 and was based in Verdi, Nevada and was the headquarters of Boomtown Reno. It was acquired on July 1, 1997, by Hollywood Park, Inc. (now Pinnacle Entertainment) for $188 million.

The company agreed on January 19, 1995, to buy National Gaming for $500 million, to be partly financed by Hospitality Franchise Systems, which had spun off National months earlier. Boomtown cancelled the deal on April 4, 1995, because of shareholder objections.

== List of properties ==
- Boomtown Biloxi — Biloxi, Mississippi
- Boomtown Las Vegas — Enterprise, Nevada
- Boomtown New Orleans — Harvey, Louisiana
- Boomtown Reno — Verdi, Nevada
