= Boomtown Reno =

Casino and Hotel in Verdi, Nevada

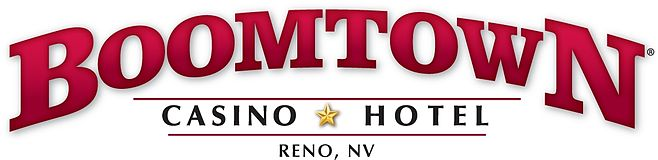

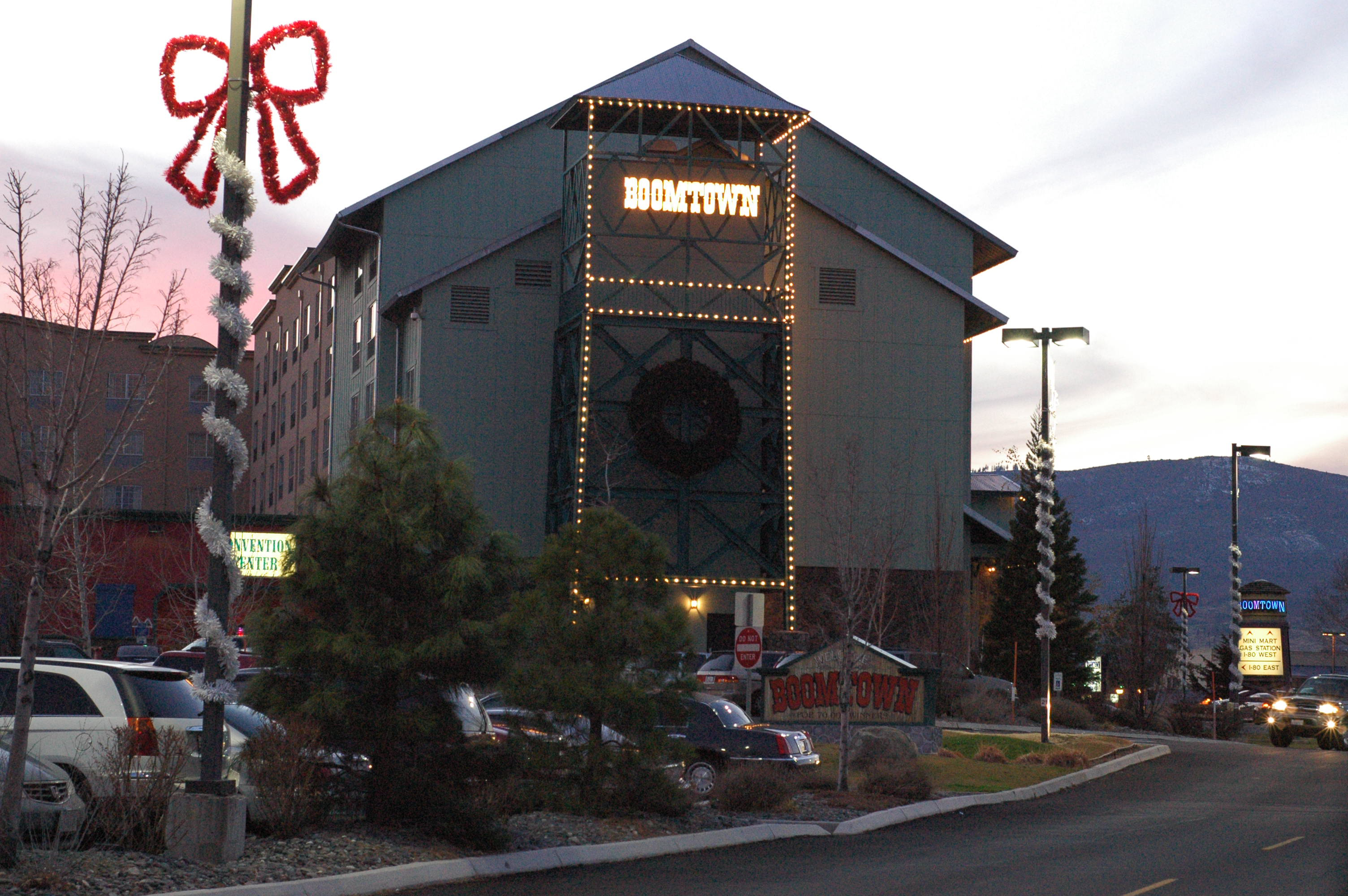
- Interactive map of Boomtown Reno
- Location: Verdi, Nevada, U.S.; 2100 Garson Road; 39°30′42″N 119°57′46″W
- Opened: April 21, 1964; 62 years ago
- No. of rooms: 316
- Gaming space: 39,630 sq ft (3,682 m^{2})
- Permanent shows: Live Entertainment 7 days a week
- Signature attractions: Boomtown Fun Center; Kampgrounds of America; Verdi Grillhouse & Casino
- Notable restaurants: Boomtown Steakhouse; Market Fresh Deli; The Buffet (until 2020); Peet's Coffee & Tea; The Original Mel's Diner (a space formerly occupied by Denny's)
- Owner: St. John Properties
- Renovated in: 1970, 1971, 1978, 1998, 2014, 2015, 2016, 2017, 2025, 2026
- Website: boomtownreno.com

Boomtown Reno is a hotel and casino located in Verdi, Nevada, just west of the Reno–Sparks metropolitan area. The hotel features 318 guest rooms and suites, and the casino has a 39,630 square feet (3,682 m^{2}) gaming area.

== History ==
The property began as a truck stop called Bill and Effie's, in the mid-1960s serving travelers on Interstate 80. Over time, it expanded into a full hotel-casino resort.

Ownership Timeline:

Previous owners of Boomtown Reno were businessman and former Reno mayor Bob Cashell of Cashell Enterprises (1968–1988), Boomtown, Inc. (1988–1997) and Pinnacle Entertainment, formerly known as Hollywood Park, Inc. (1997–2012)

In 2012, Pinnacle sold the property for $12.9 million to St. John Properties (a Maryland-based real estate firm) and M1 Gaming (the company of former Station Casinos executive Dean DiLullo). In 2014, M1 Gaming exited the property and St. John began the process of taking full ownership of Boomtown.

The Boomtown hotel became affiliated with Best Western in 2016.

Incidents:

On February 26, 2018, a man was fatally shot on the property.

== Features ==
The hotel is remodeled in contemporary motif and has full casino with slots, table games, sports book, poker and Keno. A 30,000 sq ft (2,800 m^{2}) Family Fun Center features games, a motion theater, virtual rides, Ferris wheel, carousel and a 9-hole miniature golf course.

There is a Mel's Diner, Steakhouse, Peet's Coffee and Market Fresh Deli located inside well.

== Gallery ==
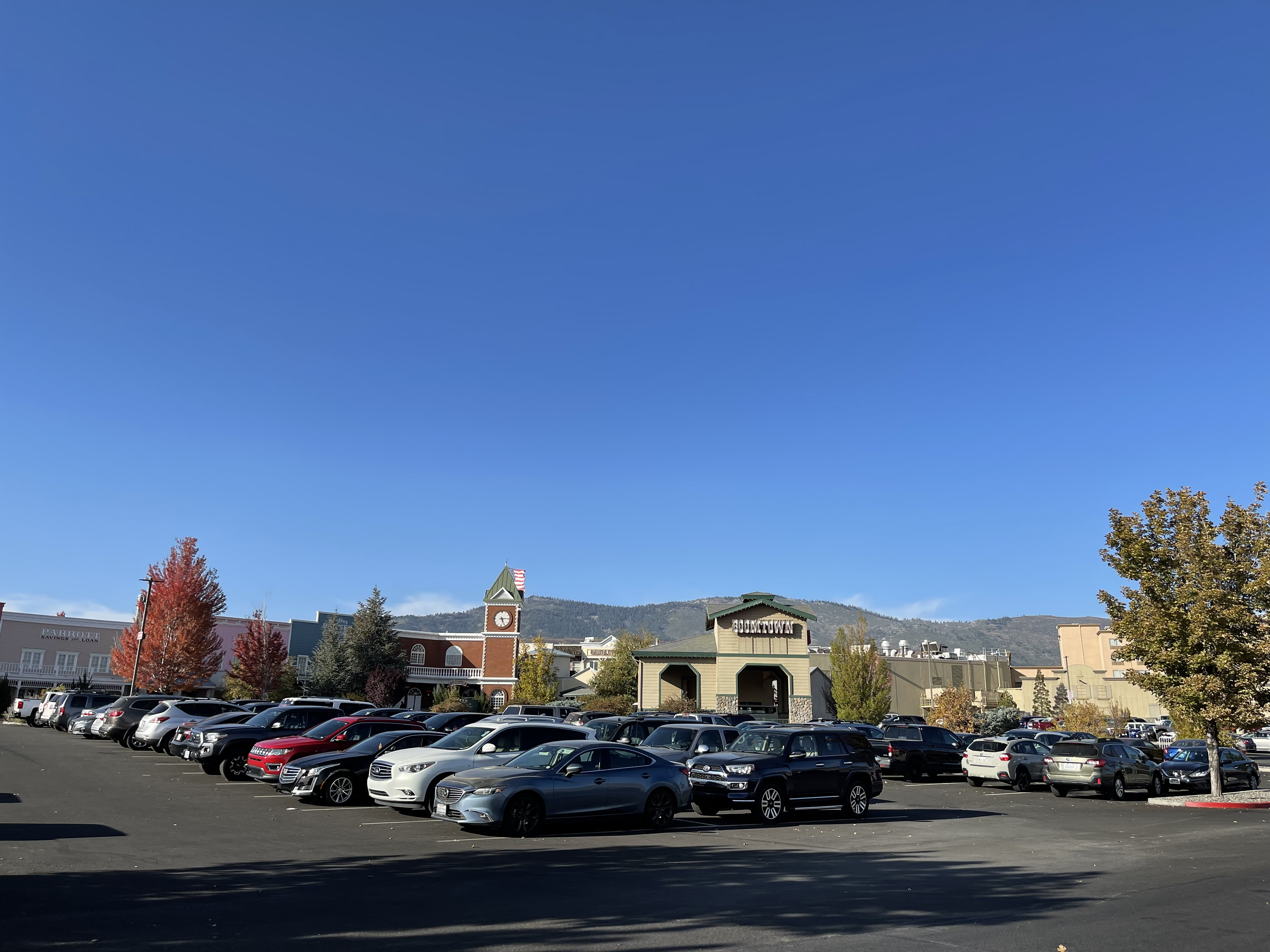
West side of Boomtown Reno

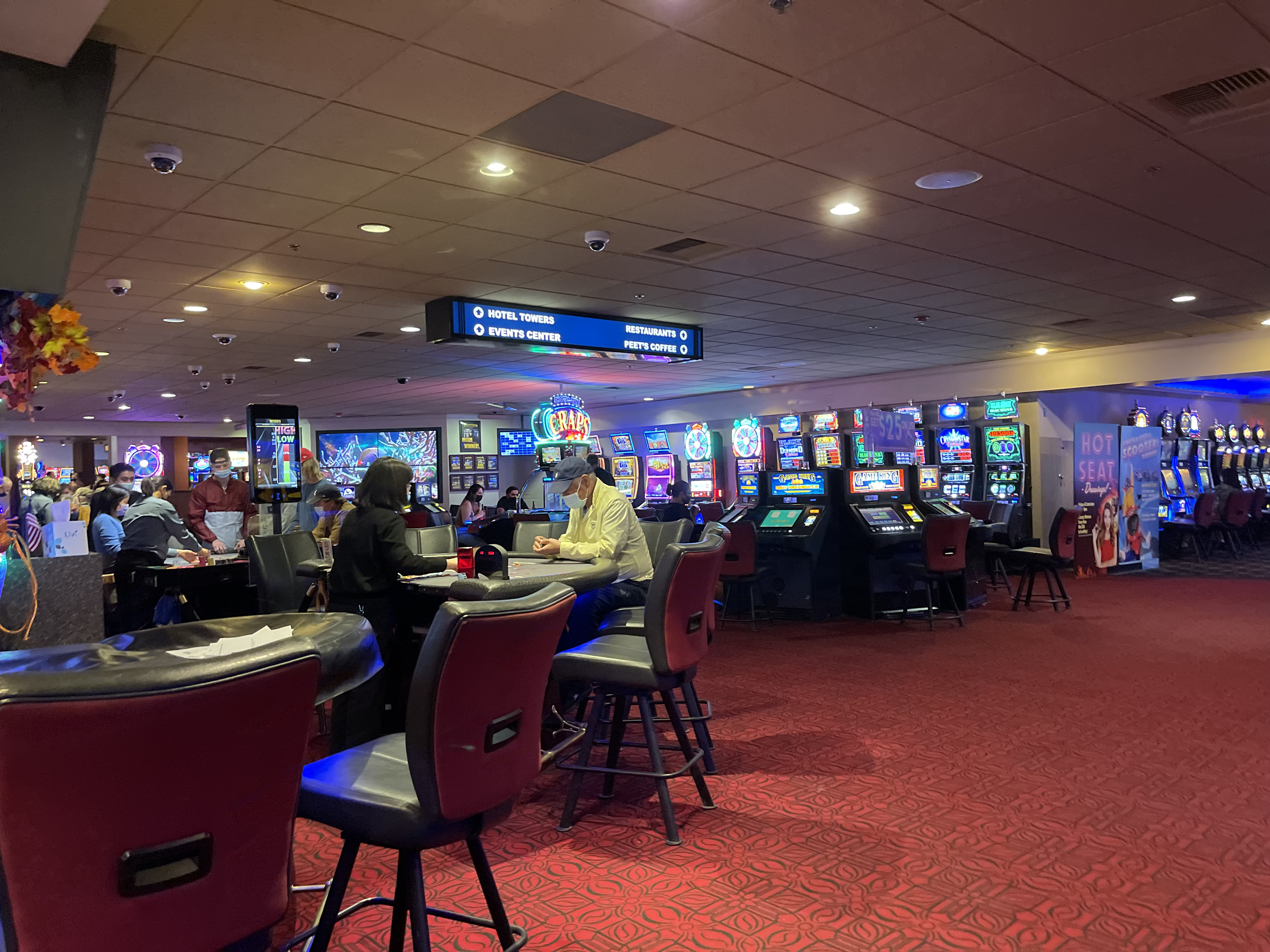
Casino floor

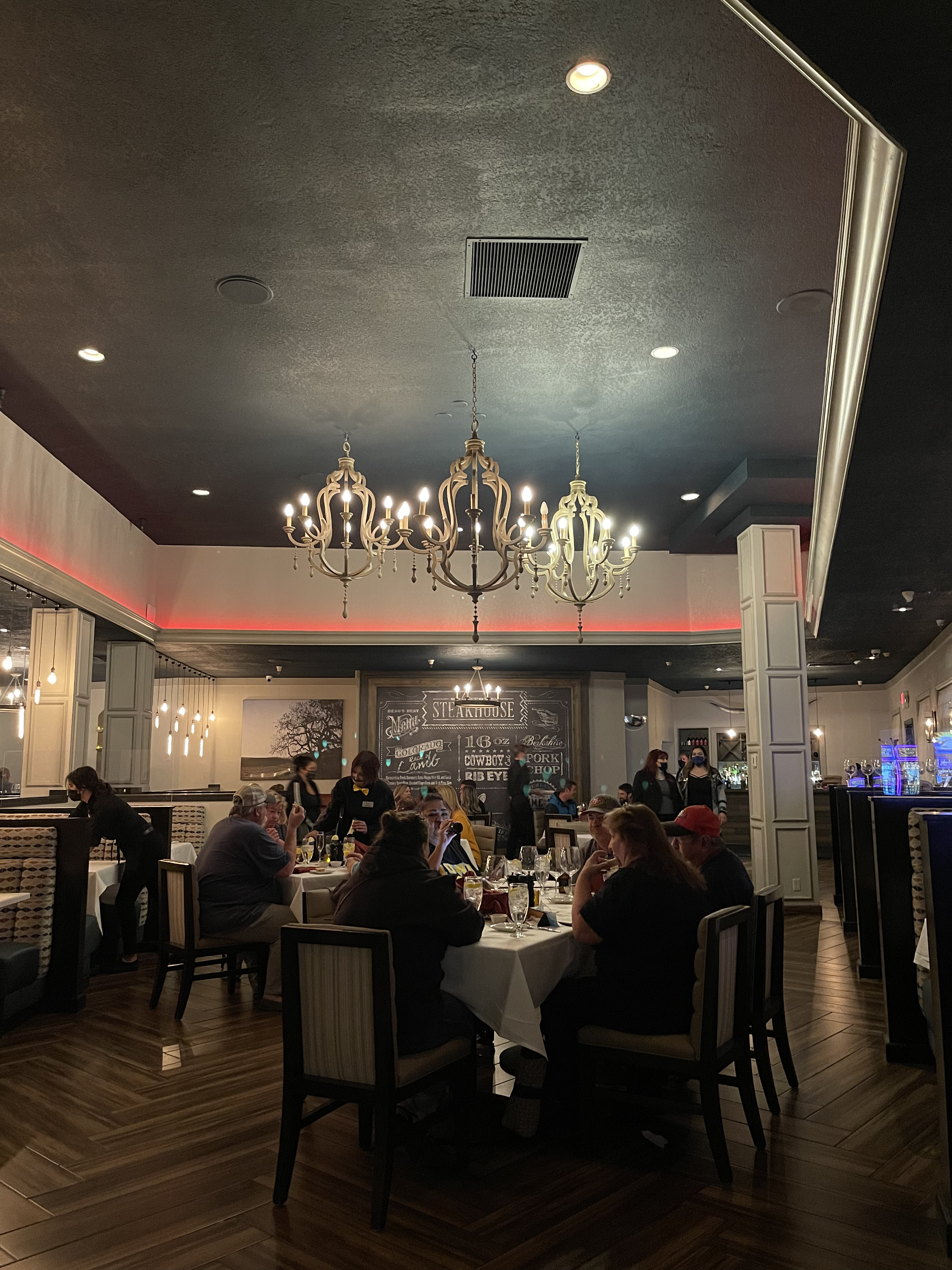
Boomtown Steakhouse

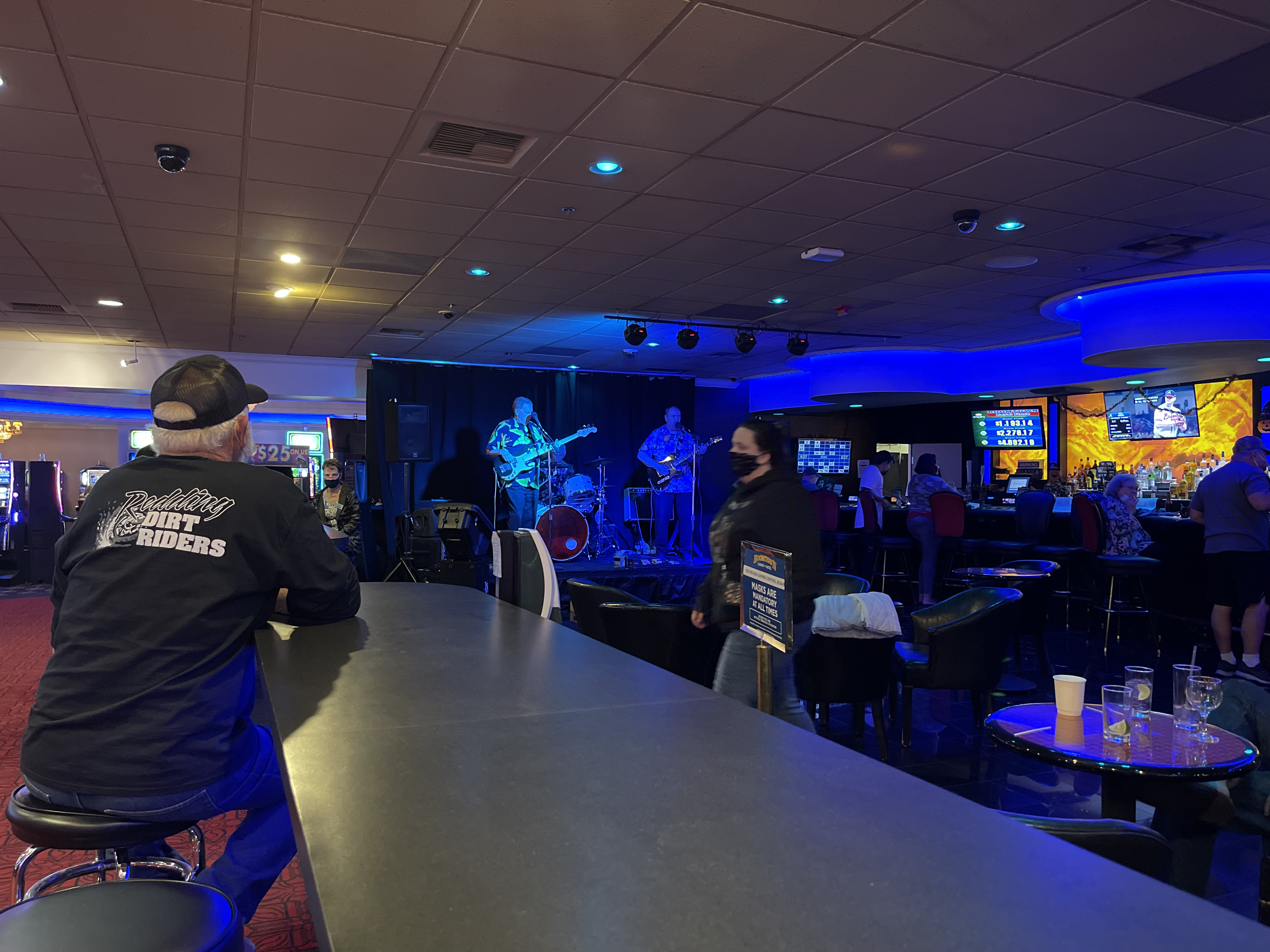
Guitar Bar

== See also ==
- List of casinos in Nevada
- Boomtown Bossier City
- Boomtown New Orleans
- Silverton Las Vegas
