= Jackpot, Nevada =

- Census-designated place
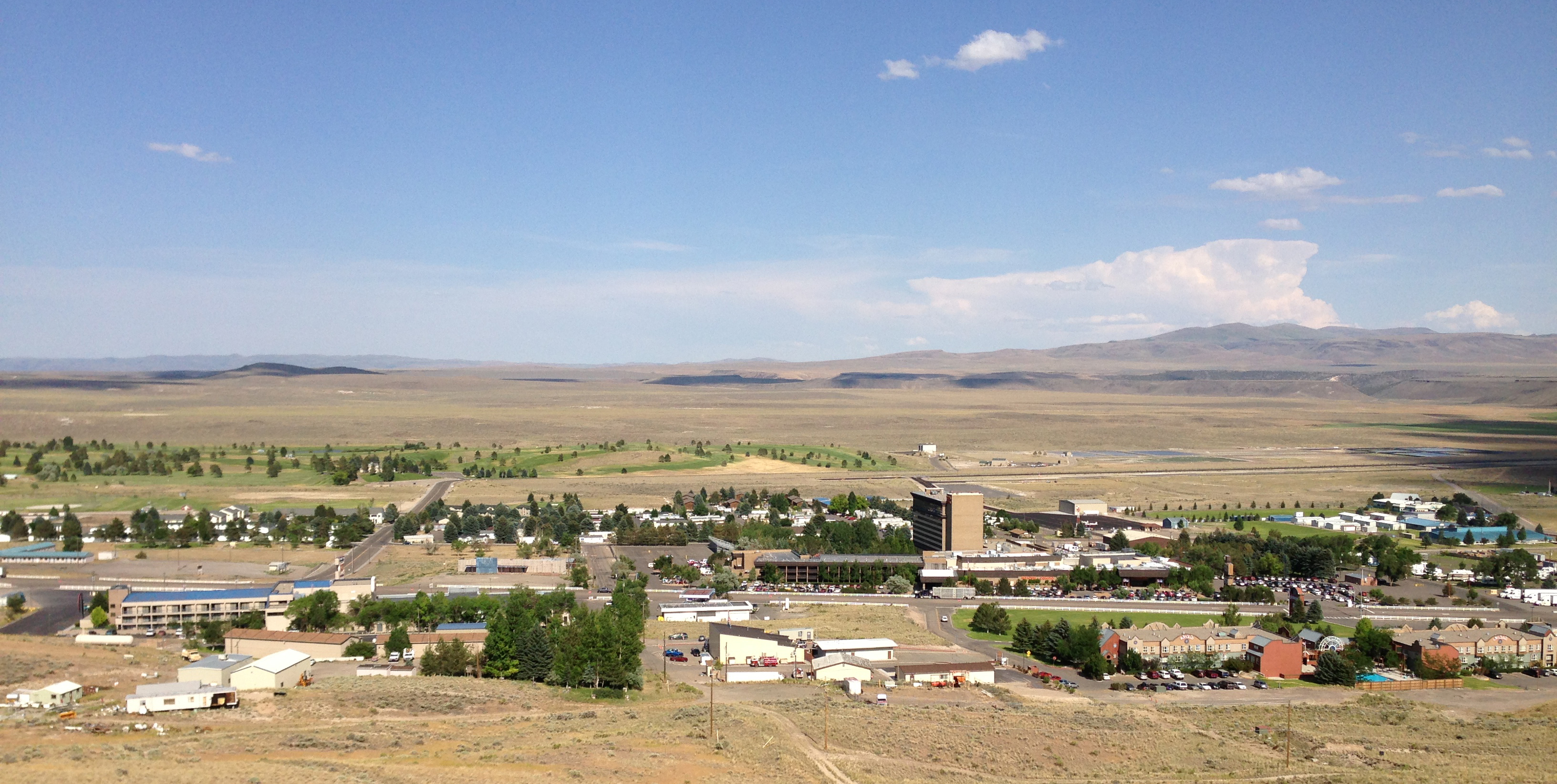
- Jackpot from the west in 2013

- Location within the United States Location within Nevada
- Coordinates: 41°58′47″N 114°39′52″W
- Country: United States
- State: Nevada
- County: Elko
- Founded: 1954; 72 years ago

Area
  - Total: 3.94 sq mi (10.20 km^{2})
  - Land: 3.90 sq mi (10.09 km^{2})
  - Water: 0.042 sq mi (0.11 km^{2})
- Elevation: 5,204 ft (1,586 m)

Population (2020)
  - Total: 855
  - Density: 219.5/sq mi (84.76/km^{2})
- Time zone: UTC-7 (MST)
  - Summer (DST): UTC-6 (MDT)
- ZIP code: 89825
- Area code: 775
- FIPS code: 32-36500
- GNIS feature ID: 2583935

Jackpot is an unincorporated community and census-designated place (CDP) in the western United States, located in Elko County, Nevada. The population was 855 as of the 2020 census. Located less than one mile (1.6 km) south of the Idaho border on US 93, Jackpot has been a popular casino gaming destination for residents of Idaho and other neighboring states since its founding.

Jackpot is located 47 miles (76 km) south of Twin Falls, a city of approximately 50,000. Although officially part of the Elko micropolitan area, Jackpot is often considered part of the Greater Twin Falls region.

In addition to its casino industry, Jackpot has its own schools, golf course, and post office. Its elevation is approximately 5,200 feet (1,580 m) above sea level.

Jackpot observes Mountain Time, along with other Idaho border towns such as Jarbidge, Mountain City and Owyhee, due to its economic ties with the Magic Valley region of southern Idaho. The Nevada Department of Transportation and Federal Aviation Administration recognize this local unofficial observance.

== History ==
After Idaho outlawed all forms of casino gaming in 1954, "Cactus Pete" Piersanti and Don French moved their slot machine operations from Idaho to the Jackpot townsite. Piersanti's and French's gaming establishments were named Cactus Pete's and the Horseshu Club, respectively. Piersanti in particular is credited for founding Jackpot.

In May 1958, the settlement was first recognized by the Elko County commissioners as an unincorporated town named "Horse Shu", with a population of 65, despite a protest over the name by Cactus Pete's. Because the club owners could not agree on a name, the county commissioners renamed it a month later as "Unincorporated Town No. 1". The clubs compromised on the name "Jackpot" in 1959. Jackpot has been noted for its colorful place name which has been said to be the most unusual in the state of Nevada.

By 1960, the population had reached 400, but most residents were living in trailers because banks would not approve building loans, being unsure of the town's long-term prospects.

Cactus Pete's management took over the Horseshu in 1964 to form what would eventually become Ameristar Casinos. Cactus Pete's and Horseshu, as well as the independent Barton's Club 93 and the Four Jacks Casino, form the basis of the town's economy.

== Geography ==
At an elevation of approximately 5,200 feet (1,585 m) above sea level, Jackpot is located near Salmon Falls Creek and north of Middle Stack Mountain in the Granite Range of northeast Nevada. Jackpot is located about fifty miles (80 km) east (but eighty miles (130 km) by road) of the unincorporated town of Jarbidge and the Jarbidge Wilderness.

== Demographics ==
Historical population
Census	Pop.	Note	%±
2020	855		—
U.S. Decennial Census

The 2010 United States census reported that Jackpot had a population of 1,195. The racial makeup of Jackpot was 61% White (41% Non-Hispanic White), 1% African American, 32% from other races, and 4% from two or more races. Hispanic or Latino of any race were 56%.

There were 451 households, out of which 33% had children under the age of 18 living in them. The average household size was 2.65. There were 266 families (59% of all households); the average family size was 3.60.

The population was spread out, with 31% under the age of 18 and 9% who were 65 years of age or older. The median age was 34.2 years.

There were 622 housing units, of which 28% were vacant. Of the occupied units, 36% were owner-occupied and 65% were rented.

The median household income was $39,926, with 15% of the population living below the federal poverty line.

== Climate ==
Jackpot experiences a humid continental climate (Köppen climate classification Dfb) bordering a semi-arid climate (BSk) with hot summers and cold winters. Even with its relatively cool average temperature, Jackpot receives barely enough precipitation to avoid being classified as a desert climate. Due to Jackpot's high elevation and aridity, temperatures drop sharply after sunset. Summer nights are comfortably cool, even chilly. Winter highs are generally above freezing, and winter nights are bitterly cold, with temperatures often dropping to zero or below.

Climate data for Jackpot, Nevada, 1991–2020 normals, extremes 1986–present
Month	Jan	Feb	Mar	Apr	May	Jun	Jul	Aug	Sep	Oct	Nov	Dec	Year
Record high °F (°C)	61 (16)	74 (23)	78 (26)	87 (31)	97 (36)	102 (39)	105 (41)	102 (39)	100 (38)	90 (32)	74 (23)	63 (17)	105 (41)
Mean maximum °F (°C)	49.5 (9.7)	55.8 (13.2)	66.5 (19.2)	75.9 (24.4)	82.6 (28.1)	92.0 (33.3)	98.3 (36.8)	96.3 (35.7)	90.9 (32.7)	79.1 (26.2)	64.7 (18.2)	52.3 (11.3)	99.0 (37.2)
Mean daily maximum °F (°C)	38.6 (3.7)	41.3 (5.2)	49.8 (9.9)	56.5 (13.6)	66.4 (19.1)	77.2 (25.1)	88.5 (31.4)	86.8 (30.4)	76.6 (24.8)	62.6 (17.0)	48.0 (8.9)	38.0 (3.3)	60.9 (16.0)
Daily mean °F (°C)	25.4 (−3.7)	28.7 (−1.8)	35.8 (2.1)	41.5 (5.3)	50.3 (10.2)	59.1 (15.1)	68.4 (20.2)	66.4 (19.1)	56.7 (13.7)	44.4 (6.9)	33.3 (0.7)	25.3 (−3.7)	44.6 (7.0)
Mean daily minimum °F (°C)	12.1 (−11.1)	16.0 (−8.9)	21.7 (−5.7)	26.5 (−3.1)	34.1 (1.2)	41.1 (5.1)	48.3 (9.1)	46.1 (7.8)	36.7 (2.6)	26.2 (−3.2)	18.6 (−7.4)	12.6 (−10.8)	28.3 (−2.0)
Mean minimum °F (°C)	−4.1 (−20.1)	1.1 (−17.2)	9.4 (−12.6)	16.1 (−8.8)	24.5 (−4.2)	31.8 (−0.1)	39.8 (4.3)	36.7 (2.6)	25.9 (−3.4)	14.0 (−10.0)	4.7 (−15.2)	−5.1 (−20.6)	−10.2 (−23.4)
Record low °F (°C)	−30 (−34)	−26 (−32)	−4 (−20)	9 (−13)	13 (−11)	23 (−5)	28 (−2)	25 (−4)	20 (−7)	−6 (−21)	−18 (−28)	−29 (−34)	−30 (−34)
Average precipitation inches (mm)	0.94 (24)	0.66 (17)	0.90 (23)	1.22 (31)	1.76 (45)	1.25 (32)	0.58 (15)	0.69 (18)	0.87 (22)	1.06 (27)	0.73 (19)	0.70 (18)	11.36 (291)
Average snowfall inches (cm)	4.6 (12)	3.6 (9.1)	2.0 (5.1)	2.6 (6.6)	0.3 (0.76)	0.0 (0.0)	0.0 (0.0)	0.0 (0.0)	0.0 (0.0)	0.6 (1.5)	2.8 (7.1)	6.7 (17)	23.2 (59.16)
Average extreme snow depth inches (cm)	4.1 (10)	3.0 (7.6)	1.1 (2.8)	0.9 (2.3)	0.2 (0.51)	0.0 (0.0)	0.0 (0.0)	0.0 (0.0)	0.0 (0.0)	0.5 (1.3)	1.2 (3.0)	2.6 (6.6)	5.2 (13)
Average precipitation days (≥ 0.01 in)	4.5	3.8	4.6	6.6	8.3	4.6	3.5	3.2	3.0	3.7	4.1	4.9	54.8
Average snowy days (≥ 0.1 in)	2.9	2.2	1.6	1.7	0.2	0.0	0.0	0.0	0.0	0.3	1.9	3.6	14.4
Source 1: NOAA
Source 2: National Weather Service

== Transportation ==
U.S. Route 93 bisects the town as it travels north towards Twin Falls and south towards Wells. The closest airport with commercial service is Magic Valley Regional Airport in Twin Falls. The community is also served by Jackpot Airport.

== Education ==
Jackpot has a public library, a branch of the Elko-Lander-Eureka County Library System.

Jackpot has a K-12 school known as the Jackpot Combined School. The school houses 284 students.

== Casino industry ==
Jackpot has five main hotels and motels with casinos:

- Barton's Club 93
- Cactus Pete's, operated by Penn Entertainment, is the largest hotel in Jackpot with 300 guest rooms
- Four Jacks Hotel and Casino
- Horseshu Hotel and Casino, operated by Penn Entertainment. The casino is currently closed, but the hotel's 100 guest rooms remain open
- West Star Hotel and Casino, the hotel here remains open but the casino has been closed since summer 2022
- Dotty's

In 2005, Triad Resorts announced plans to build the Spanish Bit Resort and Casino, a resort casino with indoor waterpark and event center located on 113 acres (0.46 km^{2}) south of Jackpot. The project was delayed when the county mistakenly rezoned the land for the project. It was previously on schedule to be built starting in late 2010 or early 2011 after zoning and other concerns were addressed by developers and Elko County officials, but there has been no further news or development on the project since.

== In popular culture ==
- A 2003 episode of CSI: Crime Scene Investigation is set in Jackpot, but none of the scenes were filmed there; Fawnskin, California, a town in the heavily wooded Big Bear Valley, was Jackpot's stand-in in that episode.
