= Cactus Pete's =

Hotel and casino in Nevada, United States

Coordinates: 41°59′8″N 114°40′12″W

Cactus Petes Resort Casino
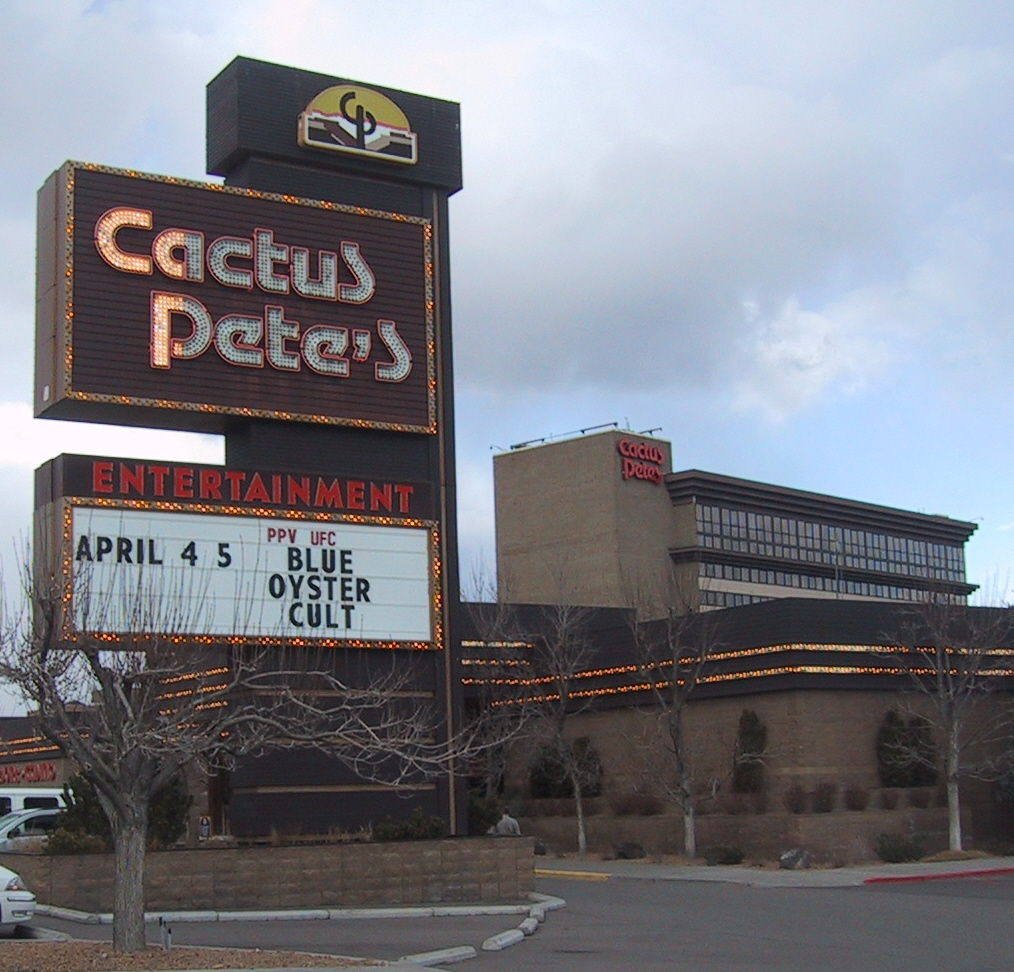
- Exterior view of Cactus Petes, the largest hotel in Jackpot, Nevada
- Interactive map of Cactus Petes Resort Casino
- Location: Jackpot, Nevada, U.S.; 1385 U.S. Route 93
- Opened: 1954; 72 years ago
- No. of rooms: 296
- Gaming space: 24,827 sq ft (2,306.5 m^{2})
- Owner: Gaming and Leisure Properties
- Operating license holder: Penn Entertainment
- Website: www.cactuspetes.com

Cactus Petes Resort Casino is a hotel and casino located in Jackpot, Nevada. It is owned by Gaming and Leisure Properties and operated by Penn Entertainment. It has 296 rooms and 24,827 sq ft (2,306.5 m^{2}) of casino floor space. The casino offerings include more than 600 slot machines, including reels, video poker, video reels and video keno; two gaming pits featuring 20 table games; a seven-table live poker room and a keno lounge and sports book.

== History ==
After Idaho outlawed all forms of casino gaming in 1954, "Cactus Pete" Piersanti moved his slot machine operations from Idaho to the Jackpot town site less than 1 mile (0.6 km) from the Idaho/Nevada border on U.S. Route 93. Piersanti's gaming establishment was named Cactus Pete's Desert Lodge. The establishment of Cactus Pete's and the nearby Horseshu Club in the same year is considered the founding of the town of Jackpot.

Cactus Pete's took over management of the neighboring Horseshu Club in 1964.

In 1991, Cactus Pete's completed a $22 million hotel and casino expansion making the property become one of the largest gaming facilities in Elko County. Designed by Steelman Partners, the expansion included adding a 10 story hotel tower, restaurants and an Olympic-sized swimming pool.

Cactus Pete's is one of the largest employers in Southern Idaho.

In 1993, Ameristar Casinos was founded as the parent company of Cactus Pete's and Ameristar Casino Vicksburg.

In August 2013, the property became part of Pinnacle Entertainment when that company acquired Ameristar Casinos. In April 2016, the property was sold to Gaming and Leisure Properties along with almost all of Pinnacle's real estate assets, and leased back to Pinnacle. Penn National Gaming (now Penn Entertainment) acquired the operations of Cactus Pete's in October 2018 as part of the acquisition of Pinnacle.

== Casino ==
Casino games include slot machines and table games tables including Royal Match Blackjack tables, Craps tables, Let it Ride Bonus tables, 3-Card Poker games, Roulette and Ultimate Texas Hold'em. The Texas Hold'em poker room also hosts weekly tournaments.

== Entertainment ==
Cactus Petes offers a variety of entertainment. The casino has a cabaret lounge that has band most nights of the week. Cactus Petes also has both an indoor concert hall called the Gala Showroom and an outdoor amphitheater. Concerts held at Cactus Petes have ranged from ZZ Top to The Beach Boys and from Willie Nelson to Chubby Checker.
