= Silverton (hotel and casino) =

Casino hotel in Nevada, United States

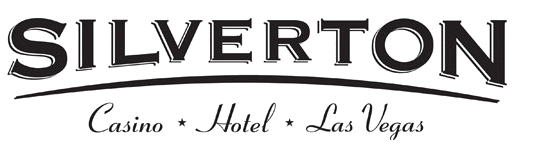

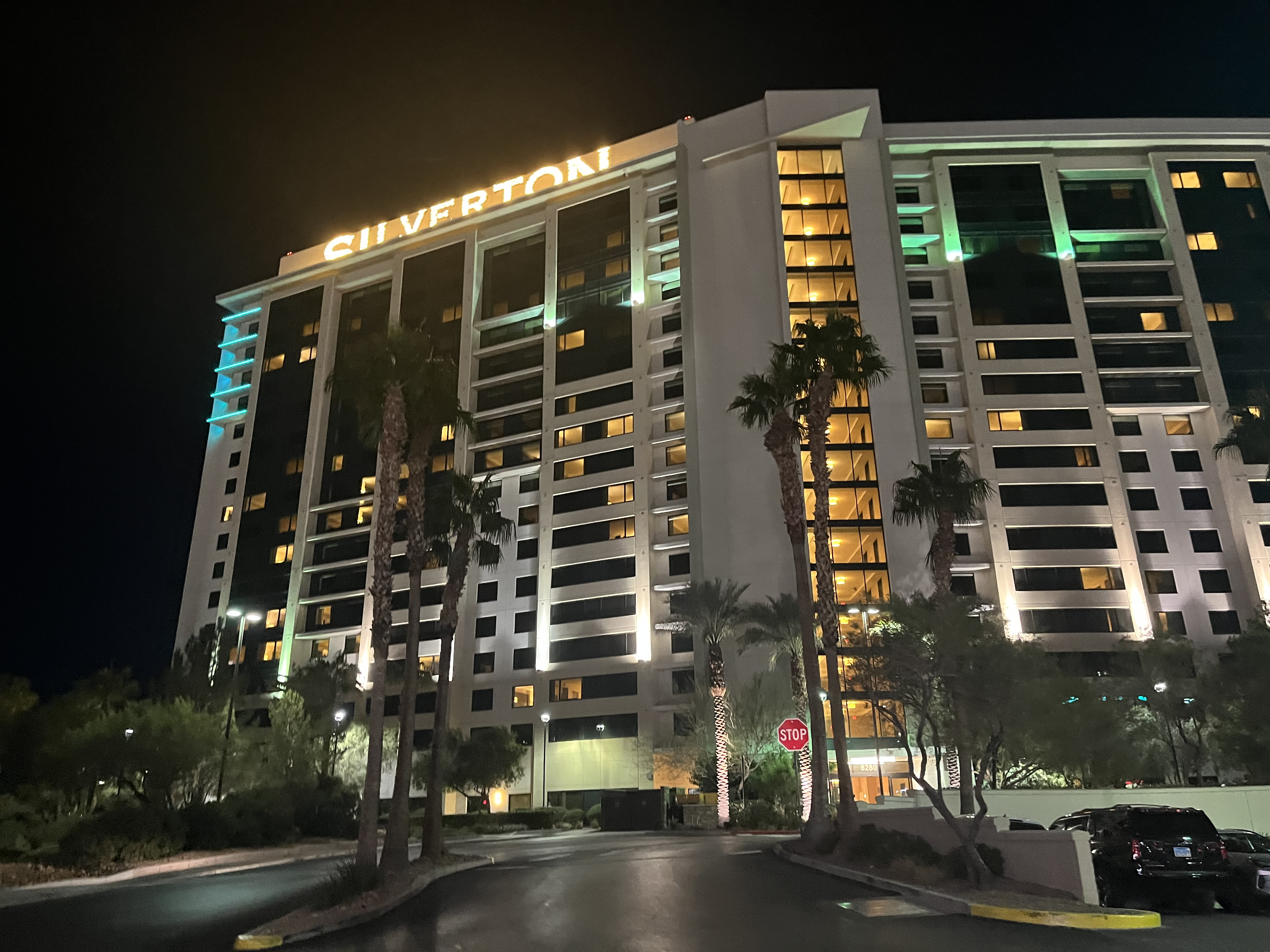
- The Silverton Hotel in 2024
- Interactive map of Silverton
- Location: Enterprise, Nevada, U.S.; 3333 Blue Diamond Road; 36.0418°N 115.1837°W
- Opened: May 20, 1994; 32 years ago
- Theme: Rustic lodge
- No. of rooms: 300
- Gaming space: 65,556 sq ft (6,090.4 m^{2})
- Signature attractions: Bass Pro Shops
- Notable restaurants: Mermaid Restaurant & Lodge; Seasons Buffet (until 2020); Sundance Grill; Twin Creeks Steakhouse
- Owner: Ed Roski Jr.
- Previous names: Boomtown Las Vegas (1994–97)
- Renovated in: 1997, 2003–05, 2008, 2022–23
- Website: silvertoncasino.com

Silverton (formerly Boomtown Las Vegas) is a 300-room hotel and casino in Enterprise, Nevada, near the southern end of the Las Vegas Valley. It features a rustic lodge theme and a 65,556 sq ft (6,090.4 m^{2}) casino. It is owned and operated by Ed Roski Jr., and is located three miles south of the Las Vegas Strip. Roski purchased an 80-acre parcel in 1989, and originally planned to build an industrial warehouse on the site, before deciding on a casino instead. In 1993, he partnered with Boomtown, Inc. to build a hotel and casino on 56 acres of the property. Roski built the project through a company of his, with financing from Boomtown, Inc.

The Boomtown hotel-casino opened on May 20, 1994, and was operated by Boomtown, Inc., which leased the facility from Roski. The hotel-casino failed to generate a substantial profit in its early years, due to a poor location. Roski took over operations in July 1997, ending his partnership with Boomtown, Inc. He renamed the property as the Silverton on December 2, 1997.

A Bass Pro Shop was added in 2004 as part of a $150 million expansion. Also added was an indoor, 117,000-gallon aquarium, which offers mermaid shows. In 2005, there were plans to eventually add other hotels, retail space, and a timeshare facility on the remainder of the Silverton property. Another expansion, costing $160 million, was finished in 2008. It included additional casino space and a parking garage.

An 18-story timeshare tower – known as The Berkley, Las Vegas – was eventually added in 2016, along with the state's first Cracker Barrel restaurant. Two years later, plans were announced for Silverton Village, a collection of retailers and restaurants. In 2019, the Silverton added a 150-room Hyatt Place hotel as part of its village plan.

== History ==
=== Boomtown ===
Ed Roski Jr. purchased an 80-acre parcel of land along Interstate 15 in 1989. The site is located three miles south of the Las Vegas Strip, at the corner of Interstate 15 and Blue Diamond Road. Roski originally intended to build an industrial warehouse, but decided that a casino could be a better use of the property.

On March 15, 1993, Boomtown, Inc. and Roski announced a joint venture to open Boomtown Blue Diamond on the property. The $70-million facility would be constructed by Roski's company, Commerce Construction, with financing from Boomtown.

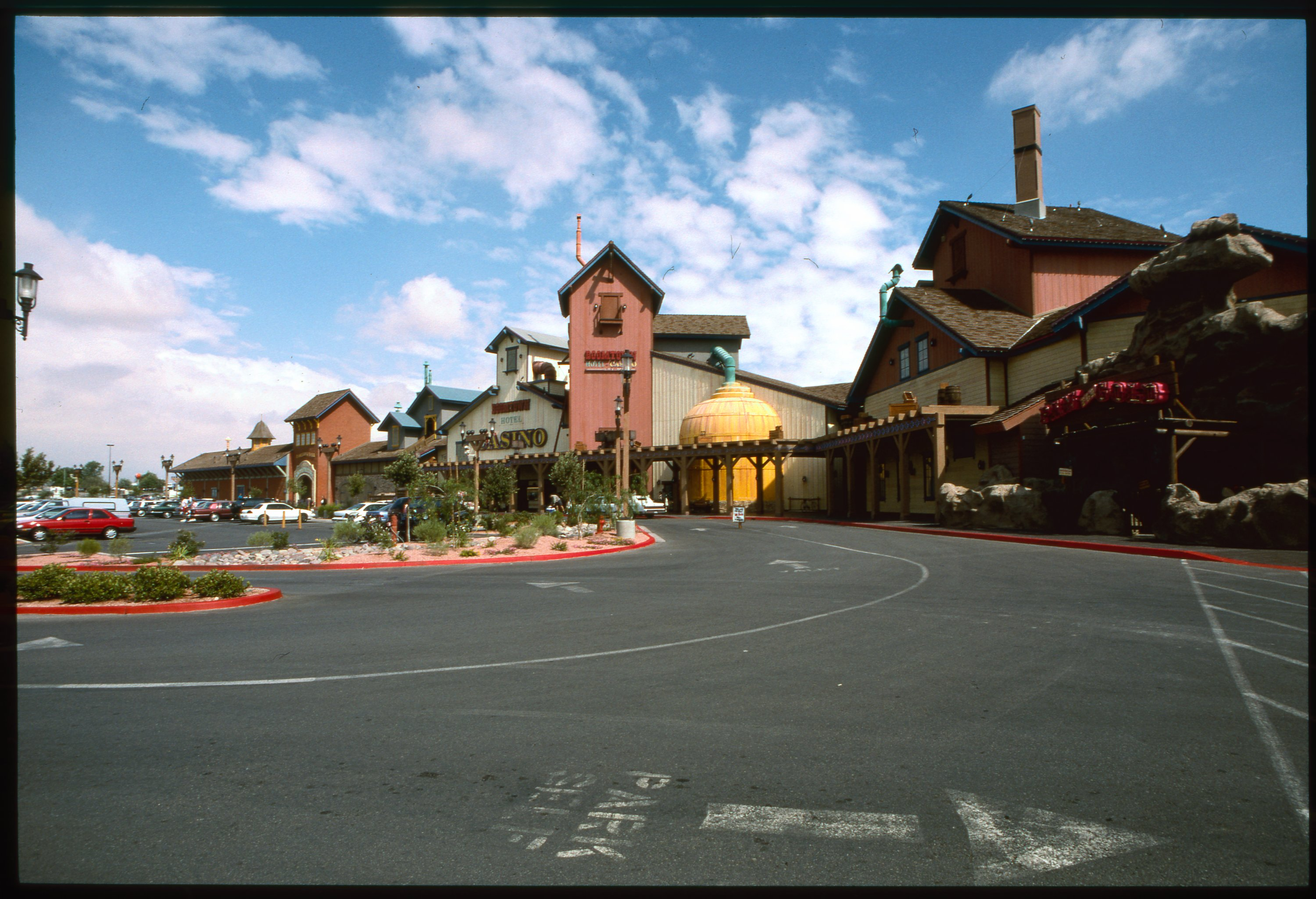

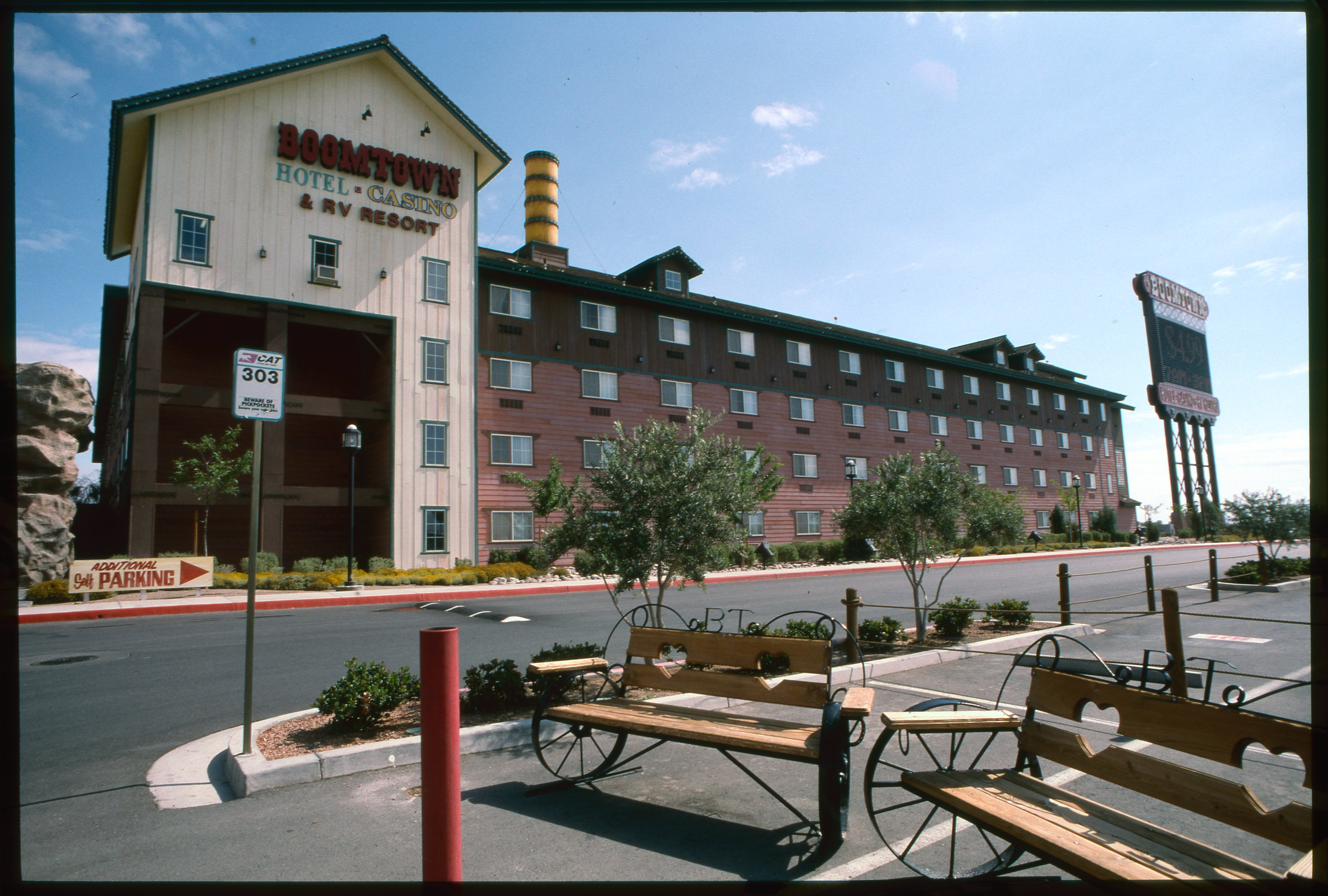
Boomtown casino entrance and hotel, 1996

Located on 56 acres, Boomtown Las Vegas opened on May 20, 1994, with a country western theme. The casino included gold panning in an artificial stream, and the 600-seat Opera House dinner showroom. Former Nevada governor Robert List was among officers in the new property, serving as senior vice president and corporate counsel. A month after the opening, Boomtown, Inc. exercised an option to buy out Roski's 50% share of the property's operating company. Roski remained as the site's landlord.

Management deemed the poker room to be in a poor location. It was closed in mid-1995, and was relocated to the center of the casino, near restaurants and restrooms. The four-table poker room reopened on June 1, 1996. It allowed food consumption at the tables, an uncommon custom in Las Vegas.

The casino struggled to draw visitors, earning annual cash flow of less than $10 million. Its remote location made it unattractive to locals, and tourists would frequently pass it up in favor of the nearby Las Vegas Strip. Boomtown's chairman and chief executive officer, Tim Parrot, said that the hotel needed around 1,000 rooms to adequately compete against nearby resorts. However, Boomtown's lease with Roski made it financially infeasible for the company to purchase the land and expand.

In March 1996, Boomtown, Inc. entered an agreement to be merged with Hollywood Park, Inc. The deal would allow Boomtown to expand the Las Vegas property, although Hollywood Park had little interest in the hotel-casino. An agreement was reached on August 12, 1996 for Roski to buy the property's operating company, in exchange for $8.5 million in promissory notes, $2.1 million in cash and a release from the property's lease. The sale was completed on July 1, 1997, the day after the Hollywood Park-Boomtown merger was completed. Roski owned 90 percent of the hotel-casino, and the remainder was owned by his company, Majestic Nevada Inc.

=== Silverton ===
Silverton logo (mid-2000s)

Roski renamed the property as Silverton on December 2, 1997, and spent $10 million on new signs and employee uniforms, among other things. He began down a path of cutting staff from 1,400 to 900. A John Wayne-like character, who would greet guests at the casino, was retired. Roski began targeting local residents as the primary demographic, especially people living in nearby Green Valley. He also planned to attract younger, higher-income guests, while retaining the older clientele. The move towards a younger demographic was inspired by the success of the Rio and Hard Rock resorts in Las Vegas.

The Silverton casino measured 36,000 sq ft (3,300 m^{2}). It included 1,200 slot machines and 18 table games. The hotel had 304 rooms, and also offered 460 RV spaces. The property also included an 800-seat showroom. Roski planned to eventually renovate the restaurants, and to expand the hotel and casino. He had been approved to add a 12-story, 600-room tower.

==== Initial expansion ====
In June 2000, plans were announced for a $200 million expansion that would include 900 additional hotel rooms, an expansion of the casino, a parking garage, four restaurants, and a movie theater complex. Roski hoped to turn the Silverton into a tourist-driven property. At the time, 70 percent of the Silverton's clientele consisted of locals. The expansion was scheduled to begin in 2001, and a second phase was to add a separate hotel tower and casino on adjacent property. The expansion plans were put on hold while Roski pursued other business opportunities, and the plans were later changed to include a retail component, with hotel expansion being delayed. Business had improved thanks to new housing communities opening nearby, including Seven Hills. However, retail was lacking in the newly developing area.

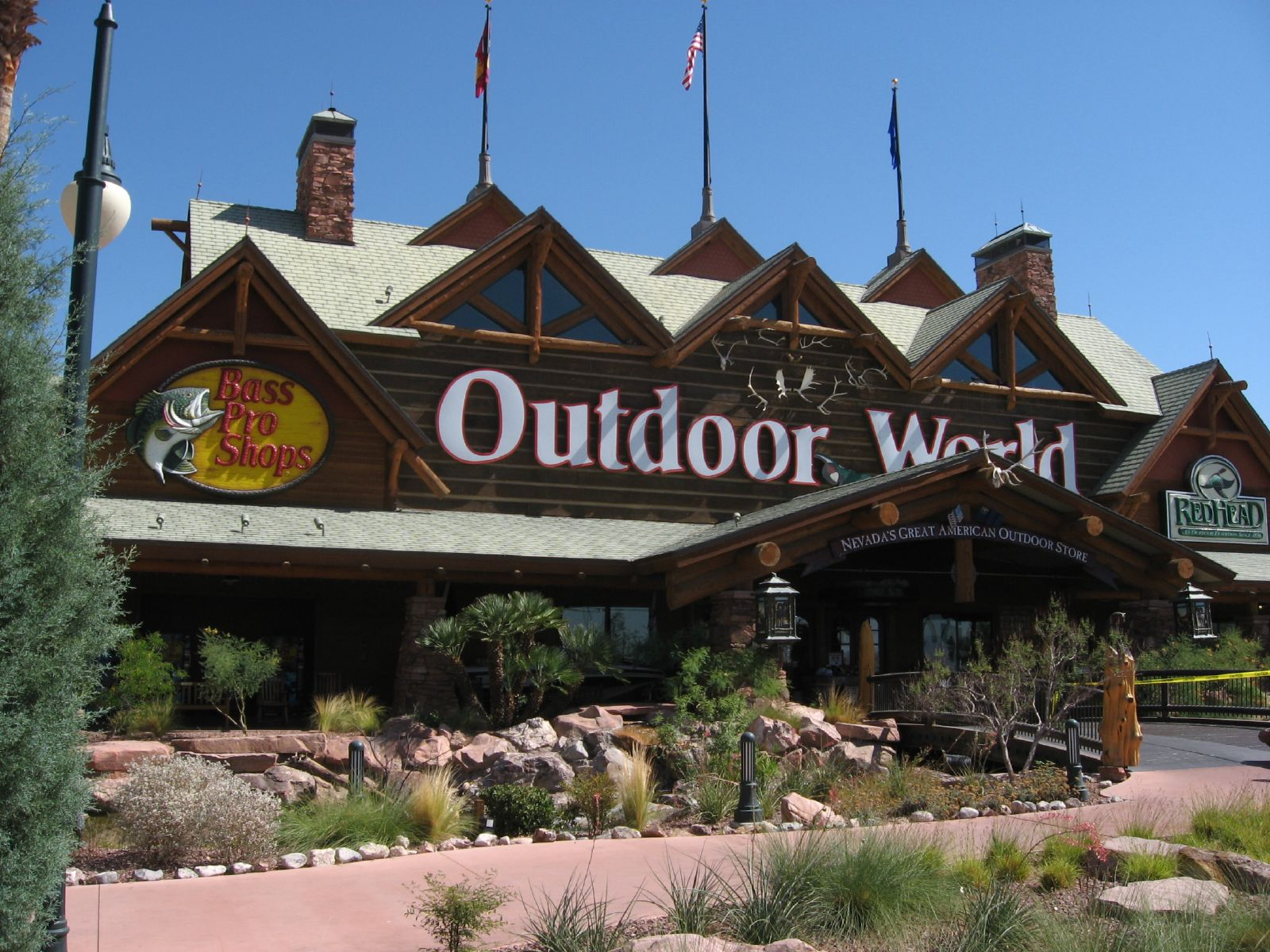
Bass Pro Shops at Silverton

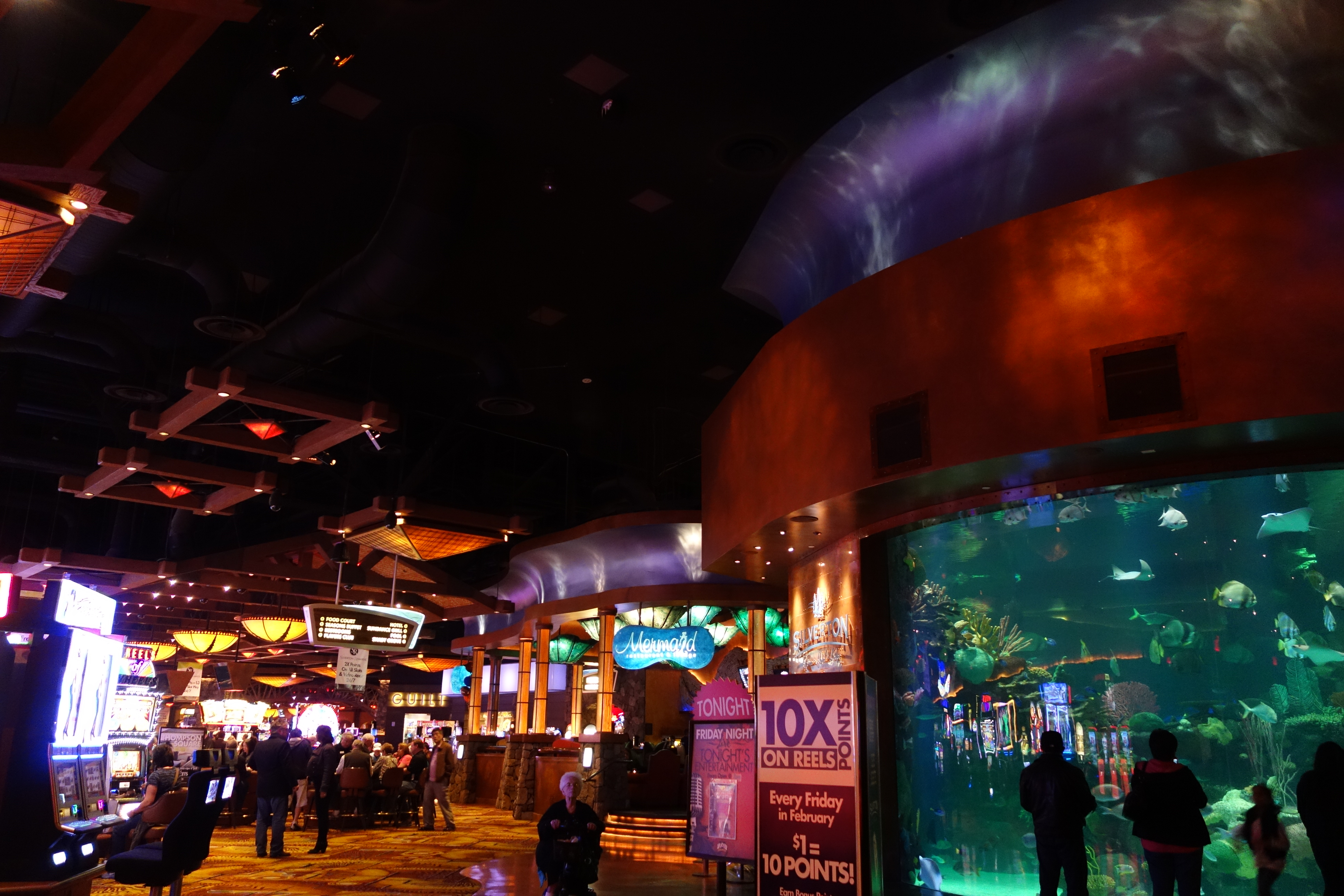
Silverton aquarium

The upscale Sundance Grill restaurant was added in early 2003, in an effort to attract residents from the affluent Southern Highlands community. Later that year, the Silverton announced that it would add a Bass Pro Shops Outdoor World as part of a multi-year expansion project. The project would include new restaurants, hotel renovations, an expansion of the casino floor, and the addition of a large aquarium in the casino area. The entire resort would replace its mining town theme with an outdoor mountain lodge appearance, matching the Bass Pro store. Future plans included a potential timeshare tower.

The Bass Pro store was built directly south of the casino, and connected to it. The two-story, 165,000 sq ft (15,300 m^{2}) store opened on November 15, 2004. It was the company's first location in the western United States, and targeted local residents and tourists. The store's opening helped to increase business at the Silverton.

Among the casino's new eateries was the Twin Creeks steakhouse, and the Mermaid Restaurant & Lounge, which features mermaid shows in the casino's aquarium. The aquarium holds 117,000 gallons of water, and includes sting rays and small sharks, in addition to the mermaid performers. Each December, the aquarium also hosts underwater Santa Claus actors.

The property's expansion cost a total of $150 million, and was completed in January 2005. Hootie & the Blowfish subsequently performed at the Silverton on several occasions, and the property opened Hootie & the Blowfish's Shady Grove Lounge. The casino has hosted other entertainers as well, including Sheena Easton, Twisted Sister, and the Village People.

==== Later expansions ====
In March 2005, the Silverton announced a master plan to develop the remaining vacant land into a mixed-use resort over the next several years, at a cost of up to $2 billion. The project would include a second locals casino and at least five different hotels, as well as retail space, entertainment venues, and a combination of condo hotel and timeshare units. The project was devised by the Silverton's general manager, Craig Cavileer. By that point, the Silverton had become popular among new homebuyers in the area, and had also become a tourist-oriented property in part because of its Bass Pro Shop. The Silverton's clientele included regular visitors from southern California as well as tourists visiting the Las Vegas Strip.

A buffet and Mexican restaurant were added in 2006, and a 54-foot sign was added along Interstate 15 in March 2007. The following month, plans were announced for a $500 million expansion that would include a 25-story hotel tower. However, the expansion was scaled back due to the economic impact of the Great Recession. The expanded facilities opened in November 2008, and included 35,000 sq ft (3,300 m^{2}) of additional casino space. Also added were two new restaurants and a $750,000 Starbucks. The expansion also included the property's first parking garage, a five-level structure with 1,500 spaces. The $160 million expansion added 40 employees to the resort's 800-person work team. The planned hotel tower was eventually canceled. An aggressive marketing campaign was launched with the expansion to compete with the newly opened M Resort nearby. Following the 2008 expansion, concerts were held in temporary venues set up on the property, while plans for a new showroom were considered.

Cantor Gaming opened a sportsbook at the Silverton in 2012. A Cracker Barrel restaurant opened on the Silverton property in July 2016. It was the company's first location in Nevada. It was built in a separate building near the Silverton, but is considered part of the resort.

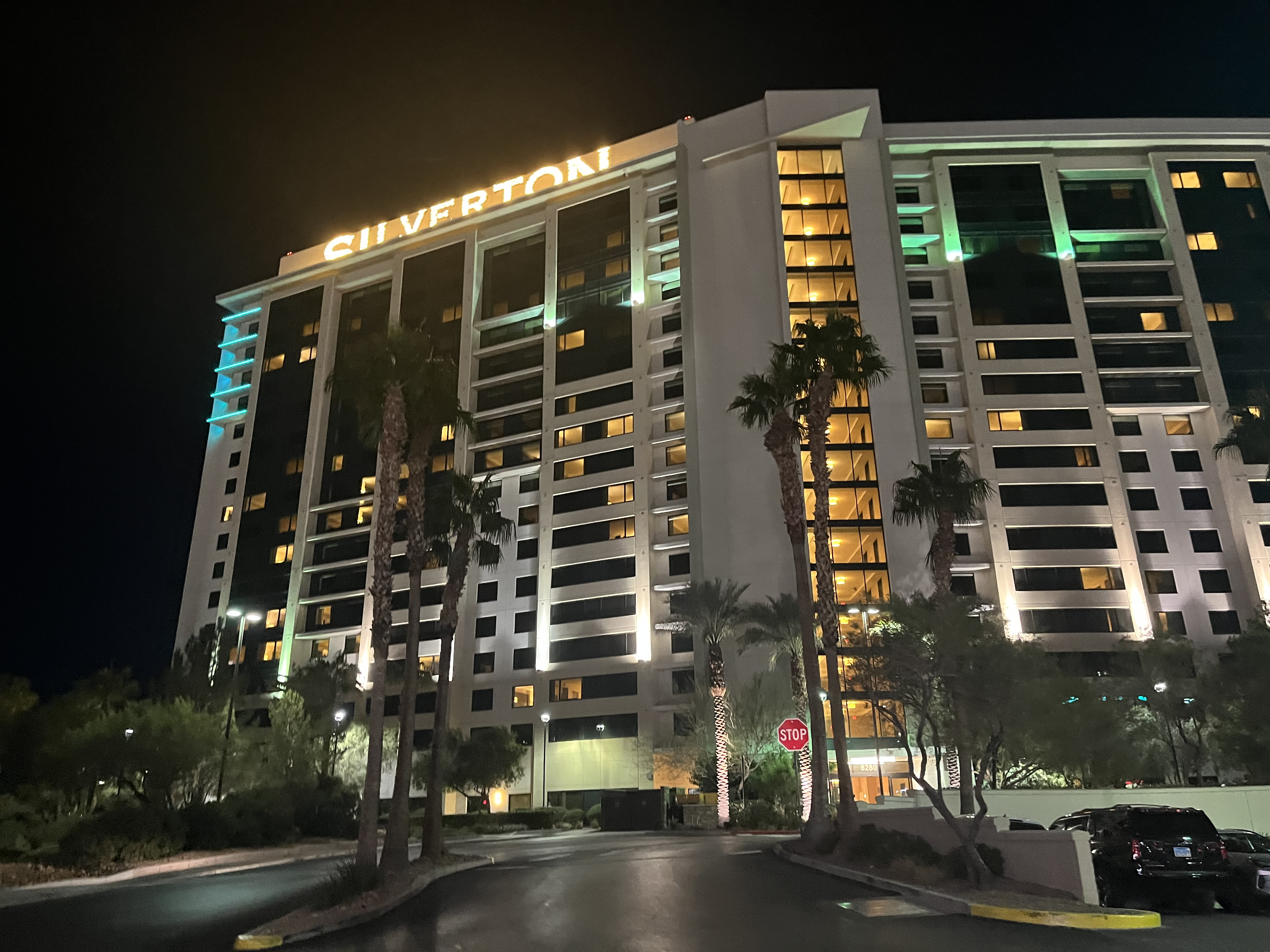
The Berkley in 2024

The Berkley, Las Vegas, an 18-story, 400-unit timeshare building, was opened on part of the Silverton property in late 2016, and the top of the tower features the Silverton name. It was developed and operated by The Berkley Group, based in Florida.

In 2017, a music video was shot at the Silverton by German rapper Capo.

In April 2018, groundbreaking took place for Silverton Village, a $60 million project that would include various eateries and a five-story Hyatt Place hotel with 150 rooms. The hotel would be built alongside Interstate 15, near the Cracker Barrel, while retail space would be built at Blue Diamond Road and Dean Martin Drive, an intersection where more than 50,000 vehicles passed each day. The retail component would include approximately 28,000 sq ft (2,600 m^{2}) spread across four buildings, and was expected to be complete within a year. At the time of groundbreaking, old plans were being reviewed and new ones were being created in consideration of how to develop the remaining land. Among the old plans being considered was the canceled hotel tower. A 24-hour Starbucks opened at Silverton Village in December 2018, followed by a Blaze Pizza restaurant two months later. Hyatt Place opened in 2019. It is owned and operated by the Silverton.

The Silverton's main hotel and pool area closed in August 2022, for a $45 million renovation. The project added rustic and western themes to the rooms. The hotel reopened in October 2023, with the updated $10 million pool area scheduled to open in 2024. That year, the casino's sportsbook operations were taken over by Circa Sports.

== Gallery ==
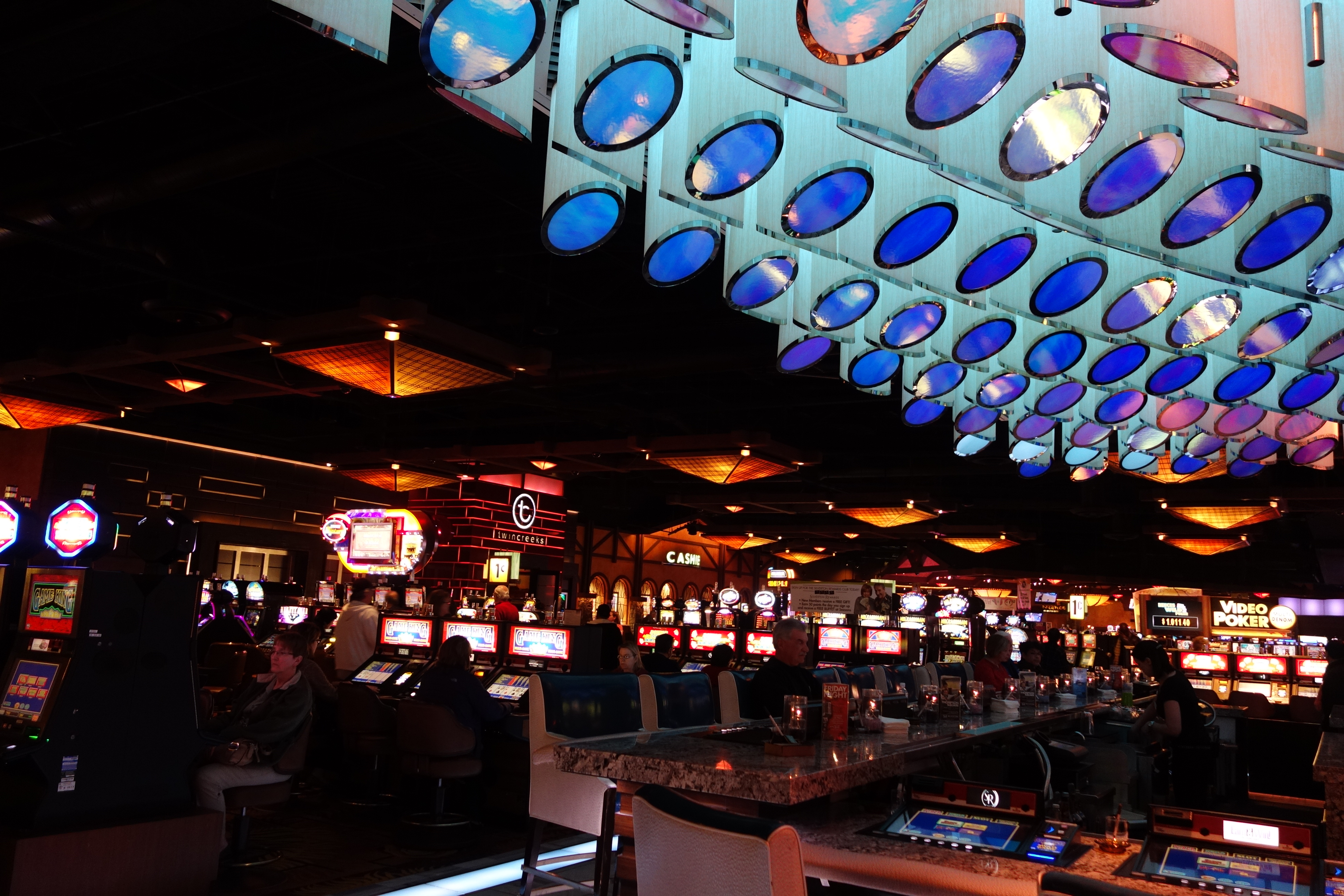
Flare Bar in 2014

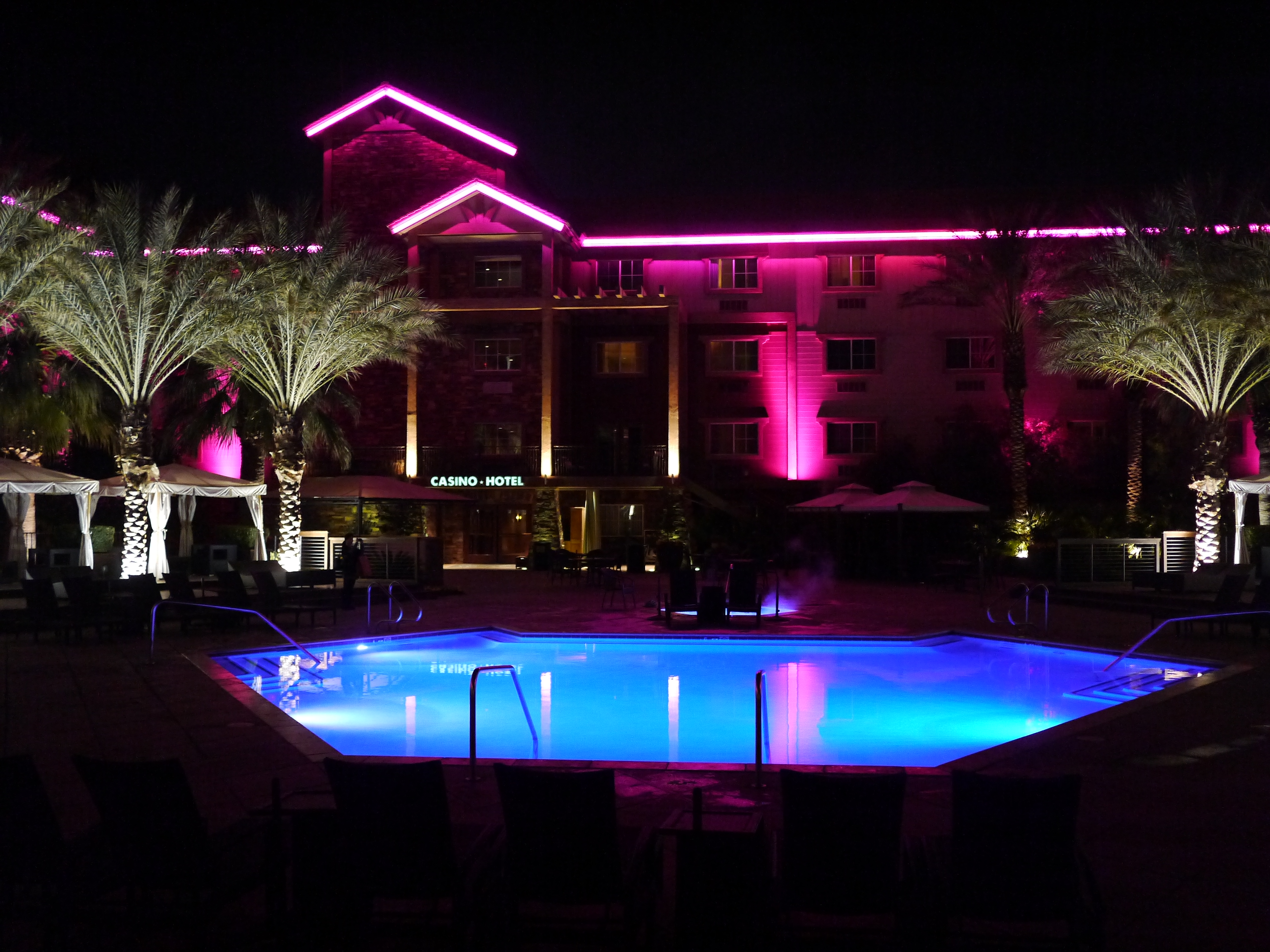
Pool area in 2014

== See also ==
- Boomtown Biloxi
- Boomtown Bossier City
- Boomtown New Orleans
- Boomtown Reno
