= Boomtown Bossier City =

Hotel and casino located in Bossier City, Louisiana

- Interactive map of Boomtown Bossier City
- Location: Bossier City, Louisiana, U.S.; 300 Riverside Drive; 32°30′36″N 93°43′58″W
- Opened: October 4, 1996; 29 years ago
- No. of rooms: 186
- Gaming space: 37,000 sq ft (3,400 m^{2})
- Notable restaurants: 1800 Prime Steakhouse; Boomer's Cafe; Cattleman's Buffet; Sundance Cantina
- Owner: Gaming and Leisure Properties
- Operating license holder: Penn Entertainment
- Previous names: Casino Magic Bossier City (1996–2002)
- Renovated in: 1996, 1998, 2001, 2002
- Website: boomtownbossier.com

Boomtown Bossier City (formerly Casino Magic Bossier City) is a hotel and casino located in Bossier City, Louisiana. It is owned by Gaming and Leisure Properties and operated by Penn Entertainment.

== History ==
Casino Magic Corp. merged with Hollywood Park, Inc. in 1998.

Pinnacle Entertainment renamed it Boomtown in 2002.

== See also ==
- Boomtown Biloxi
- Boomtown New Orleans
- Boomtown Reno
- Silverton Las Vegas
- List of casinos in Louisiana
