= Boomtown New Orleans =

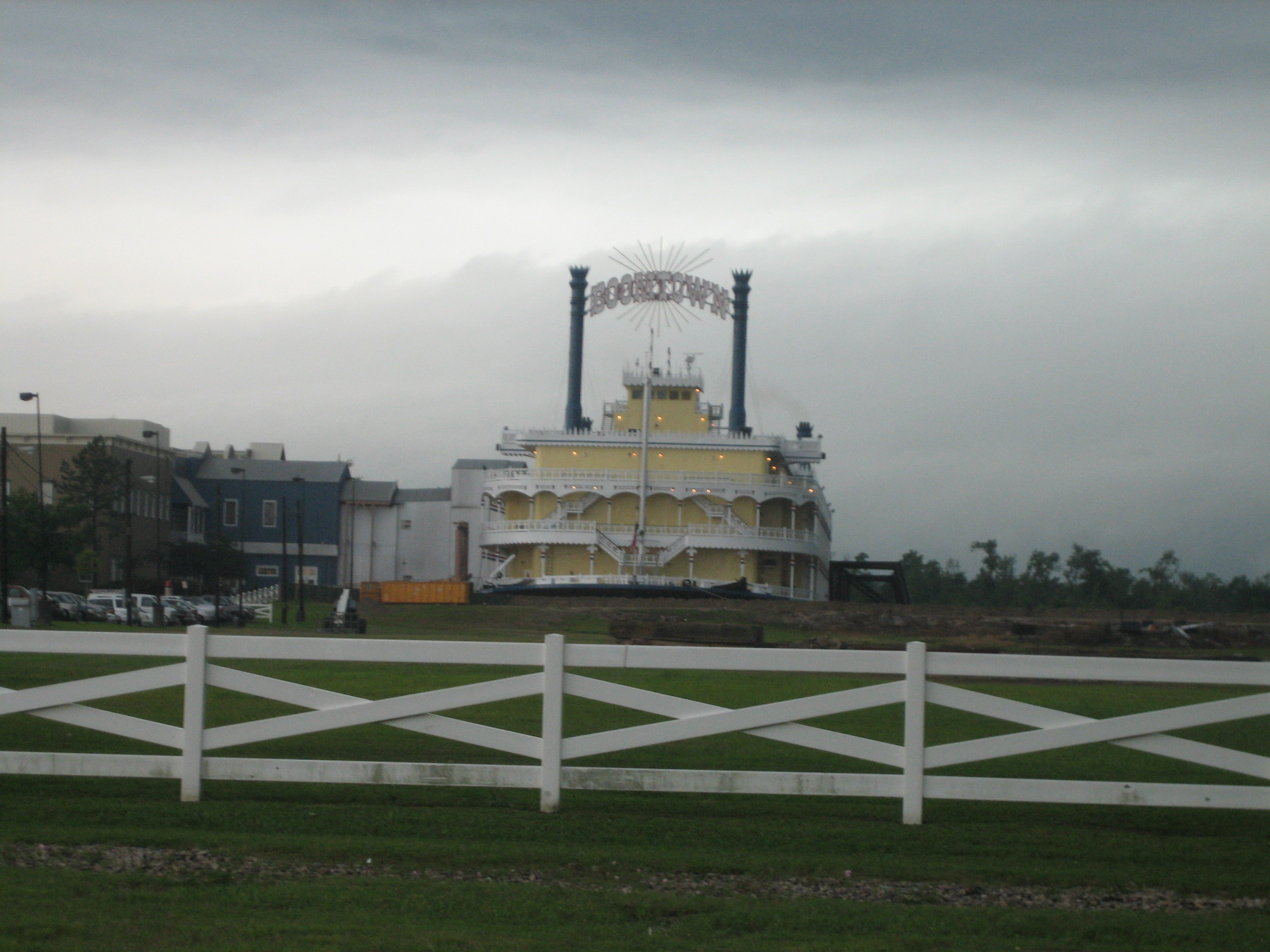
- Interactive map of Boomtown New Orleans
- Location: Harvey, Louisiana, U.S.; 4132 Peters Road; 29.8482°N 90.0604°W
- Opened: August 6, 1994; 32 years ago
- Theme: Old West and Riverboat
- No. of rooms: 150
- Gaming space: 30,000 sq ft (2,800 m^{2})
- Notable restaurants: Asia; Bayou Market Buffet; Bayou Market Express; Oyster Bar; Pier 4
- Owner: Gaming and Leisure Properties
- Operating license holder: Penn Entertainment
- Previous names: Boomtown Westbank (1994–2002)
- Renovated in: 2015
- Website: boomtownneworleans.com

Boomtown New Orleans (formerly Boomtown Westbank) is a casino hotel located on the West Bank of Jefferson Parish in Harvey, Louisiana. It is on a 54-acre (220,000 m^{2}) site. It is owned by Gaming and Leisure Properties and operated by Penn Entertainment.

== Casino ==
Boomtown is the largest riverboat casino in Southeast Louisiana since its acquisition of one of the twin River City Casino riverboats in 1998. It has over 1,500 slots and video poker games, 30 table games on the first floor, and is open 24 hours a day.

== Amenities ==
Boomtown has a five-story hotel with 150 rooms.

The facility offers four different dining options: NOLA Steak, The Sportsbook, Asia and Bayou Market Express. Entertainment options are Boomer's Nightclub where local cover bands (i.e. The Chee-Weez) and national acts come to perform and special event parties. There's also the ETC gift shop.

== History ==
Boomtown, Inc. opened its Boomtown Westbank casino on August 6, 1994.

The property became part of Hollywood Park, Inc. (later Pinnacle Entertainment) with its purchase in 1997 of Boomtown, Inc.

In 2006, Pinnacle approved a major expansion for Boomtown New Orleans, expected to cost $145 million, including a 200-room, four-star hotel with a spa and salon, an expansion of the Boomers nightclub, an Asian restaurant, additional meeting space, a new employee dining area, and an expansion of the buffet. The expansion was supposed to start in the first quarter of 2007 and be finished by the second quarter of 2008.

A renewed expansion plan was announced in 2012, including a $20-million, 150-room hotel, fitness center, meeting rooms, and 250 new parking spaces. The hotel opened on January 21, 2015.

In 2016, the property was sold to Gaming and Leisure Properties along with almost all of Pinnacle's real estate assets, and leased back to Pinnacle. Penn National Gaming (now Penn Entertainment) acquired Boomtown's operations in 2018, as part of the acquisition of Pinnacle.

On August 17, 2026, it was announced that PENN Entertainment, Inc. would invest to $195 Million to build a landside casino to replace Boomtown Casino. After the casino is built landside, it will be renamed to "Hollywood Casino".

== See also ==
- Boomtown Biloxi
- Boomtown Bossier City
- Boomtown Reno
- Silverton Las Vegas
