= Ameristar Casino Kansas City =

Hotel and casino in Kansas City, Missouri, US

Coordinates: 39.1504°N 94.4848°W

Ameristar Casino Hotel Kansas City
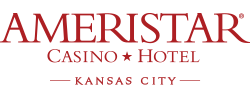

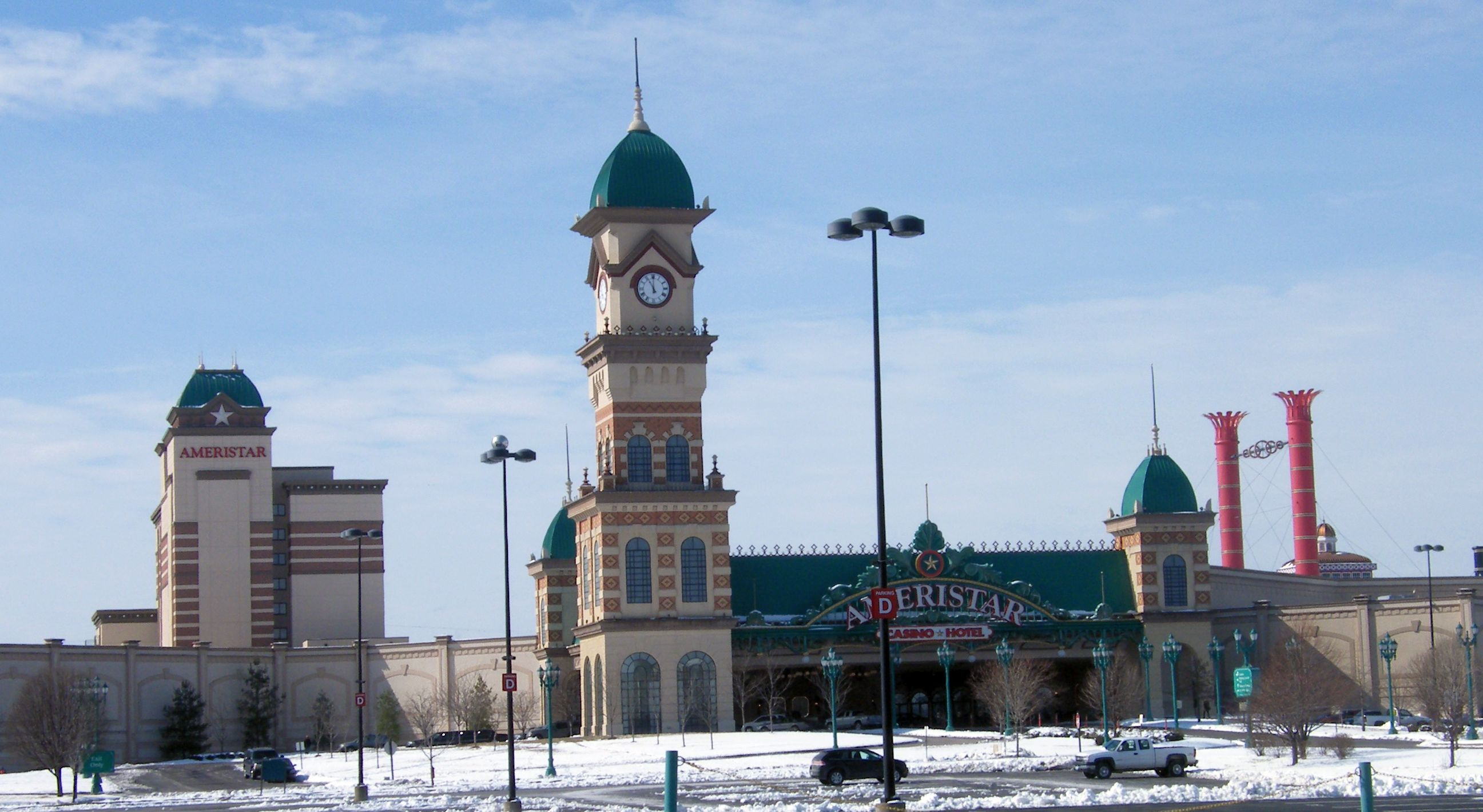
- The casino in March 2009
- Interactive map of Ameristar Casino Hotel Kansas City
- Location: Kansas City, Missouri, U.S.; 3200 Ameristar Drive
- Opened: January 16, 1997; 29 years ago
- No. of rooms: 184
- Gaming space: 140,000 sq ft (13,000 m^{2})
- Signature attractions: Regal Cinemas (1997-2022)
- Casino type: Riverboat
- Owner: Gaming and Leisure Properties
- Operating license holder: Boyd Gaming
- Previous names: Station Casino Kansas City (1997–2000)
- Website: ameristarkansascity.com

Ameristar Casino Hotel Kansas City (formerly Station Casino Kansas City) is a hotel and casino located on the Missouri River in Kansas City, Missouri. It is owned by Gaming and Leisure Properties and operated by Boyd Gaming.

The 15,000 sq ft (1,400 m^{2}) casino has 2,800 slot and video poker machines, 57 table games, a live poker room with 15 poker tables, exclusive high-limit slot and table games areas, and a 184-room hotel that includes 36 mini and 12 king suites.

== History ==
The facility opened on January 16, 1997 as Station Casino. Ameristar Casinos acquired the property on December 19, 2000 and it was rebranded to its current name.

In August 2013, the property became part of Pinnacle Entertainment when that company acquired Ameristar Casinos. In April 2016, the property was sold to Gaming and Leisure Properties along with almost all of Pinnacle's real estate assets, and leased back to Pinnacle.

In October 2018, Pinnacle sold the casino's operating business to Boyd Gaming, along with three other casinos, in connection with Pinnacle's acquisition by Penn National Gaming. The sale was required by antitrust regulators because Penn National already operated two casinos in the Kansas City area. The sale included a perpetual license to use the Ameristar name.
