= Fiesta Rancho =

Hotel and casino in North Las Vegas, Nevada

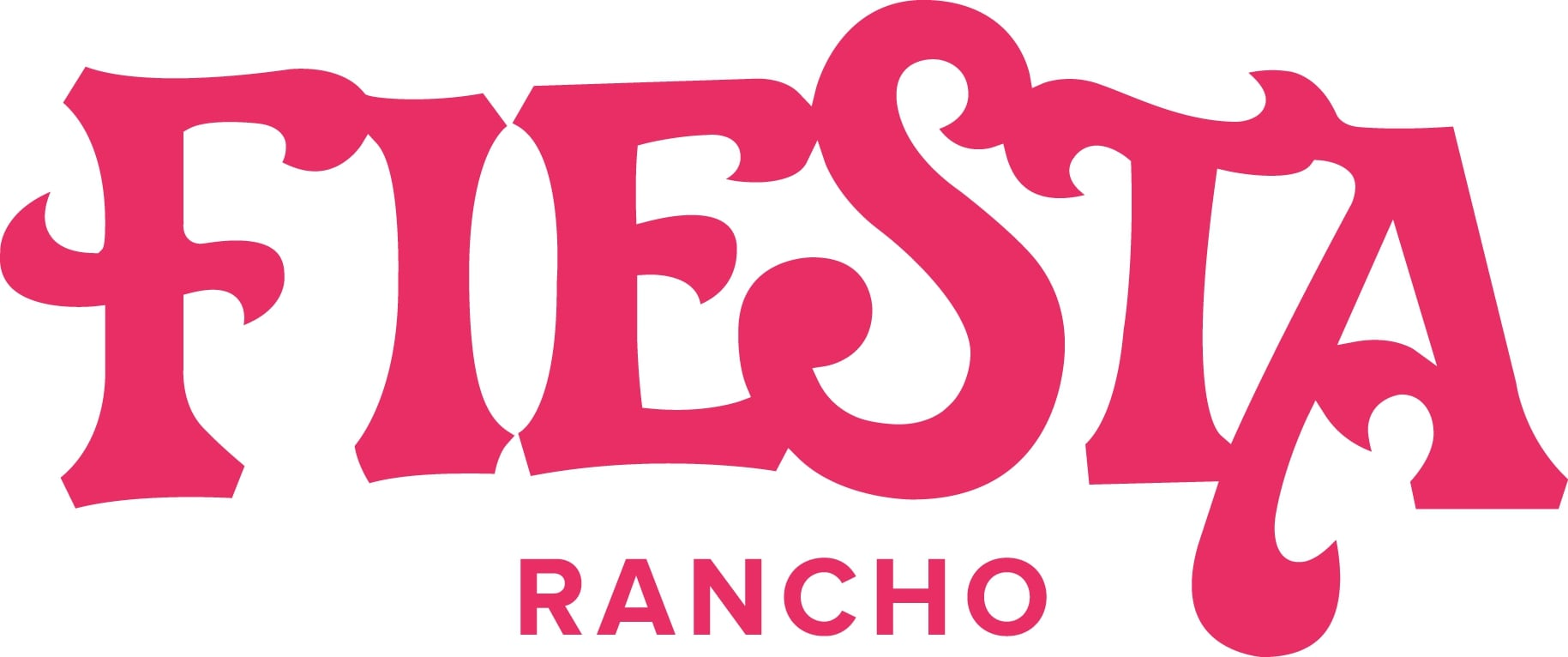

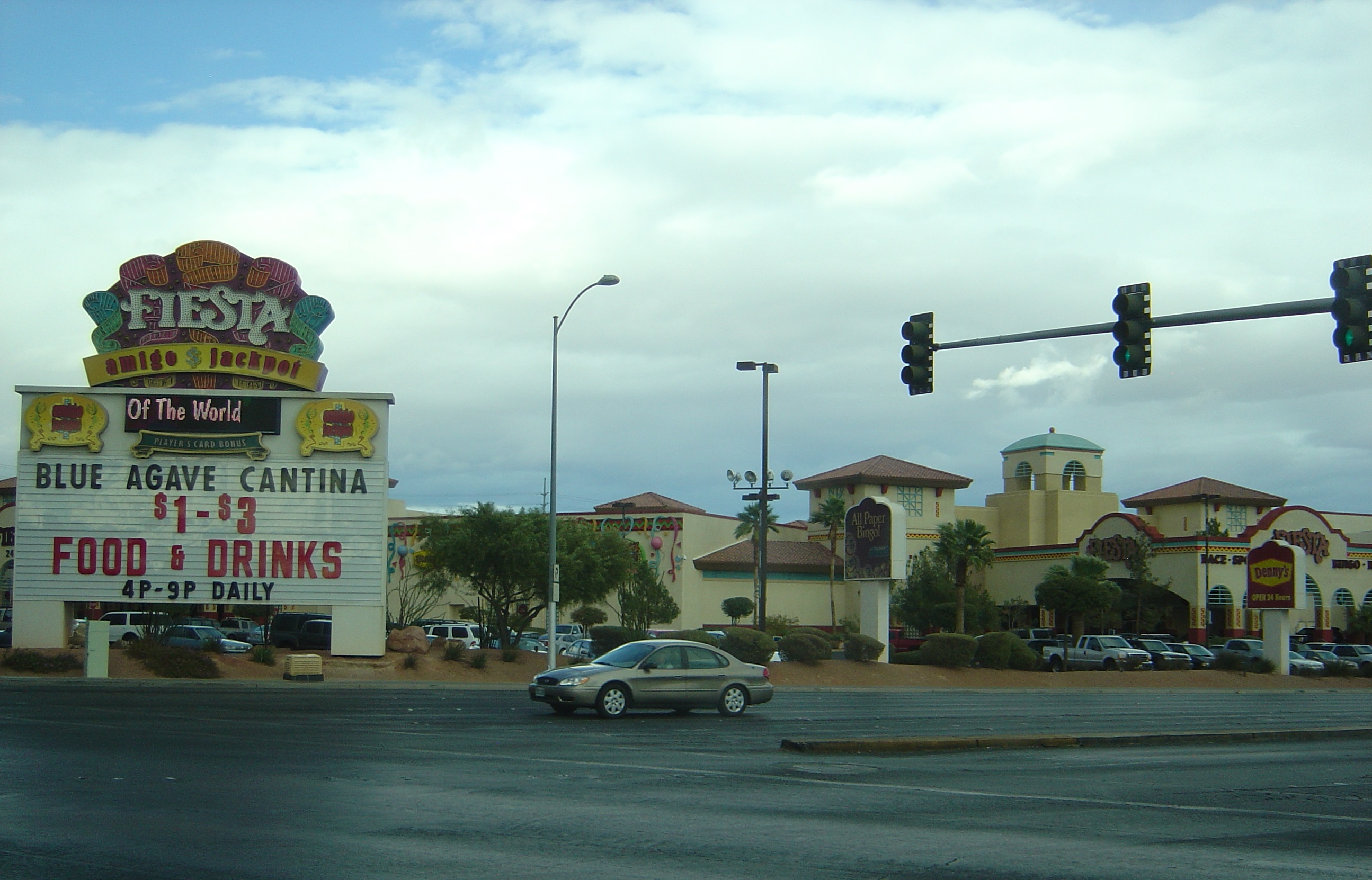
- Fiesta Rancho in 2010
- Interactive map of Fiesta Rancho
- Location: North Las Vegas, Nevada, U.S.; 2400 North Rancho Drive; 36.202816°N 115.199135°W
- Opened: December 14, 1994; 31 years ago
- Closed: March 17, 2020; 6 years ago
- Theme: Southwestern party
- No. of rooms: 100
- Gaming space: 59,932 sq ft (5,567.9 m^{2})
- Notable restaurants: Denny's; Festival Buffet; Garduño's; Big Ern's BBQ; McDonald's (1994–2010)
- Casino type: Land-based
- Owner: Station Casinos
- Previous names: Fiesta (1994–2001)
- Renovated in: 1995–1996, 1999, 2004

Fiesta Rancho (formerly known as Fiesta) was a hotel and casino located on 25.46 acres (10.30 ha) of land at 2400 North Rancho Drive in North Las Vegas, Nevada, across the street from the Texas Station hotel and casino. The Maloof family opened the Fiesta on December 14, 1994, with 100 rooms and a 25,000 sq ft (2,300 m^{2}) casino. It was the first hotel-casino to open in North Las Vegas.

The resort was popular among local residents, prompting a 50,000 sq ft (4,600 m^{2}) expansion that began in 1995. The expansion included a drive-through sportsbook, a remodeled buffet, and a larger casino. A $26 million, 50,000 sq ft (4,600 m^{2}) expansion took place in 1999, adding a food court, a parking garage, and additional casino space. At the time, a majority of the Fiesta's slot machines played video poker, and the casino had been proclaimed as "the Royal Flush Capital of the World," having paid out over 118,500 royal flushes won through its video poker machines. Station Casinos purchased the Fiesta in 2001 and renamed it as Fiesta Rancho to differentiate it from its new sister property, Fiesta Henderson.

Nevada casinos were closed on March 17, 2020, due to the COVID-19 pandemic. Prior to that point, Fiesta Rancho had been one of Station's worst-performing properties. It remained closed while other casinos began reopening, with most of its customer base relocating to the company's nearby Santa Fe Station. In July 2022, Station announced that it would demolish the Fiesta properties and sell the land.

== History ==
=== Fiesta (1994–2001) ===
George J. Maloof Jr. had wanted to own a casino in Las Vegas, and he convinced his family to build one there. The Maloof family chose to build in a location off of the Las Vegas Strip, where real estate prices were significantly higher. The property for the eventual hotel-casino – at the northeast corner of North Rancho Drive and West Lake Mead Boulevard in North Las Vegas, Nevada – was purchased by the family in 1989. The Maloof Companies announced the $15 million Fiesta in 1990, with initial plans to include an RV park. Construction was scheduled to begin in spring 1991. However, George Maloof ultimately spent three years trying to obtain financing for the project: "It was tough to put it together. A lot of people questioned the location. I looked at the growth in the area and was convinced it could work. I just had to convince other people." Because of the financing issue, construction was later scheduled to begin in early 1993, with completion approximately 10 months later, at a cost of $20 million. Groundbreaking eventually began in April 1994, with the completion and opening scheduled for December. The hotel-casino was constructed at a cost of either $25 million, or $35 million.

The Fiesta opened to the public on the night of December 14, 1994, eight hours after a formal ribbon-cutting ceremony. The Fiesta was the first hotel-casino to open in North Las Vegas, and only the second hotel-casino in the northwest Las Vegas area, after the nearby Santa Fe, also on North Rancho Drive. A future competitor, the Texas Station, opened across the street from the Fiesta in 1995. The Fiesta had a Mexican theme, and the hotel featured 100 rooms in a five-story tower. The casino consisted of 25,000 sq ft (2,300 m^{2}), with 608 slots, 14 table games, and a bingo hall. Garduño's, a Mexican restaurant chain in the Maloofs' home state of New Mexico, was among the five restaurants in the Fiesta, which also included a steakhouse and a buffet. The Garduño's restaurant was the first location to open outside of New Mexico, and it became popular among customers, with waiting periods up to four hours. The Fiesta was owned and operated by the Maloof family, while George Maloof served as the president of the hotel-casino. The hotel-casino had 700 employees. Upon opening, the Fiesta aimed to appeal to the video poker market.

==== 1995 expansion ====
George Maloof, speaking about the casino's success, said, "We figured out quickly that it was too small when we opened." The Fiesta was located within a five-mile radius of 180,000 local residents. In response to the Fiesta's success with residents, a $10 million, 20,000 sq ft (1,900 m^{2}) expansion was announced in March 1995. Gavin Maloof, the brother of George Maloof, said about the locals enjoying the Fiesta, "They don't have to go to the Strip and battle the crowds and the traffic. They enjoy our casino and they have really loved the food. We'll be expanding the buffet and adding some storage in the back. We've been having to store food in trailers in the back to keep up with the demand." Other features in the planned expansion included an entertainment lounge, an additional 200 or 300 slot machines, a larger casino pit for more table games, and a race book that would be added to the sportsbook. The expansion was expected to begin within 30 days, and was expected to be complete in approximately six months.

George Maloof enjoyed spending time on the casino floor so he could get customer flowback, and that led to him having the buffet remodeled as part of the expansion project, which ultimately was expected to cost between $15 million and $20 million. Sports on the Run, a drive-through sportsbook addition that uses pneumatic tubes, was built at a cost of over $500,000 and was opened in September 1995. The St. Louis Post-Dispatch noted that it was probably the only drive-through sportsbook in the world. The resort's expansion was completed in early 1996, and it added 50,000 sq ft (4,600 m^{2}) to the resort, including the 600-seat Festival Buffet and a larger casino area, with an additional 700 slot machines. In 1998, the Nevada Gaming Control Board considered fining the Fiesta for participating in illegal betting practices on horse races. Later that year, the Gaming Control Board filed a 17-count complaint against the Fiesta.

==== 1999 expansion ====
In February 1999, Maloof announced plans for a $22 million expansion, to be completed by mid-December 1999 for the celebration of the New Millennium. By July 1999, the expansion was expected to cost $26 million. According to Maloof, "The thrust of our expansion is entertainment, things we didn't have before. It's going to be highly themed and entertainment-oriented. It'll appeal to different markets, some younger crowds. You build these things for different times of the day." At the time, the Fiesta included 1,400 video poker and slot machines, and five restaurants, and was among nine other Las Vegas casinos to offer SportXction, a new interactive betting system. Up to that point, the casino had paid out over 118,500 royal flushes won through its video poker machines, and had been proclaimed as "the Royal Flush Capital of the World." At that time, 1,000 of the casino's 1,400 slot machines played video poker. The casino's sign would also give passers-by the casino's current total of royal flushes paid out.

The $26 million expansion was scheduled to open on November 30, 1999. The expansion was constructed on the east side of the property, and featured the addition of a food court with six restaurants. Also added was Roxy's Pipe Organ Pizzeria, which featured a large 70-year-old pipe organ that was once part of the Roxy Theater in New York. The pizza restaurant also served as a concert venue. Ahead of concerts, the pipe organ had to be temporarily removed by a hydraulic lift to make room for entertainers. Garduño's was moved to the expanded area and renamed Garduño's Restaurant, Cantina and Margarita Factory; the new location included what was billed as the world's largest tequila bar.

The 50,000 sq ft (4,600 m^{2}) expansion also increased the casino by 20,000 sq ft (1,900 m^{2}), for a total of 70,000 sq ft (6,500 m^{2}). The number of slot machines was raised 500, to nearly 2,000 machines. A four-story, 1,000-space parking garage was also added, which allowed direct access to the food court. Maloof hired 250 new workers for the expansion, bringing the Fiesta's employee total to approximately 1,300. Maloof said, "We didn't think we'd be expanding as quickly as we have since we opened. You never expand just to expand. There's got to be demand." The Fiesta had received approximately 8,000 customers a day, but Maloof projected the number to increase to 10,000 after the expansion. Maloof's future expansion plans for the Fiesta included the addition of a 500-room hotel tower and an additional 1,000 sq ft (93 m^{2}) of gaming space.

In March 2000, the Fiesta became the first casino to field test a new type of coinless gambling machines, when 50 of its video poker machines were converted to a completely coinless format. According to George Maloof, "For someone to make a whole floor coinless, the market's not ready. But there's a certain person that doesn't want to mess with coins any more. That's perfect for them." If successful, it was anticipated that the Fiesta could switch up to 300 of its machines to a coinless format. Later that year, Maloof said the casino's coinless slot machines had been successful with customers.

==== Sale ====
After six years of successful operation, the Fiesta's clientele was 99 percent local, and George Maloof wanted to expand the Fiesta brand with a new location on property he owned on Flamingo Road, west of the Las Vegas Strip. Maloof had met with Station Casinos chairman Frank Fertitta III and Las Vegas Sun editor Brian Greenspun – who owned a company that was building a hotel-casino in Green Valley, Henderson as a joint project with Station – to discuss possible joint ventures; their talks evolved, and Station ultimately announced in July 2000 that it would purchase the Fiesta. Maloof planned to use the money from the sale to fund his new $250 million hotel-casino on Flamingo Road, which eventually became the site of his Palms Casino Resort. Before the sale, the Fiesta's 1,100 employees were required to reapply for their jobs, as 412 employees from other Station casino properties had applied for a transfer to the Fiesta; Station planned to hire only 1,016 people.

In October 2000, Station agreed to purchase the Reserve hotel-casino in Henderson, Nevada, and considered redesigning it and renaming it as another Fiesta location. Station's $185 million purchase of the Fiesta was finalized in January 2001, followed later that month by the company's $70 million purchase of The Reserve. After the acquisition, the Fiesta's 1,100 employees were laid off and replaced with employees from other Station casino properties as part of an attempt to "Stationize" the Fiesta. The Fiesta's "Royal Flush Capital of the World" tagline was also discontinued.

=== Fiesta Rancho (2001–2020) ===
In March 2001, the hotel-casino was renamed Fiesta Rancho. In April 2001, Station announced that The Reserve would be renamed as Fiesta Henderson, as the company had hoped to turn Fiesta into a successful brand name. Station Casinos' chief financial officer said that some day, there would "almost certainly" be more than two Fiesta casinos in the Las Vegas Valley. By August 2001, the Fiesta Rancho's profits had declined in part because of competition from the new Suncoast Hotel and Casino – which took an estimated 20 percent of the Fiesta Rancho's customer base – and from Carl Icahn's Arizona Charlie's Decatur hotel-casino. The decline was also attributed to the layoffs of 1,100 employees, many of whom personally knew the casino's regular customers; an estimated 2,000 to 3,000 regular customers attended the Fiesta up to five times a week, but it is believed that many of them were alienated by the layoffs.

The Fiesta also had a reputation among local gamblers for its loose video poker machines, but many customers felt that this was no longer the case after the sale to Station. Anthony Curtis, publisher of the Las Vegas Advisor, said, "Any time there's a little change, these people (local gamblers) are very fickle. They'll fly off the handle, get crazy and leave. All of a sudden, they don't feel at home anymore." Station launched a large-scale marketing plan to promote the Fiesta Rancho and bring back its clientele. The Fiesta Rancho's sister property, the Fiesta Henderson, opened on December 29, 2001.

By December 2003, Station planned to remove the ice arena from its Santa Fe Station, as it was not financially viable. Instead, Station planned to begin construction on a 31,000 sq ft (2,900 m^{2}) 1,400-seat ice arena at Fiesta Rancho in April 2004, for an autumn 2004 opening. The ice rink opened under the name SoBe Ice Arena. It later became the Pepsi Ice Arena. In February 2008, the casino's table-game minimums were lowered and its "Royal Flush Capital of the World" tagline was reintroduced as part of a new promotional tactic to promote the casino as its own brand, distinct from Station. At the time, the casino still operated Sports on the Run, which accounted for 10 to 15 percent of race and sportsbook income. A new restaurant, Big Ern's BBQ, was added in 2015. As of 2017, the casino was 59,932 sq ft (5,567.9 m^{2}).

In June 2019, employees voted in favor to unionize the property by 85 percent. It was organized by the Bartenders Union and the Culinary Workers Union and supervised by the National Labor Relations Board.

==== Closure and demolition ====
Nevada casinos were among businesses required to close on March 17, 2020, due to the COVID-19 pandemic and its effects on the state. Casinos in the state were allowed to reopen on June 4, 2020, although Station Casinos planned to keep Fiesta Rancho closed for a year due to economic uncertainty brought on by the pandemic. The ice rink did reopen, however.

Fiesta Rancho was among Station's worst-performing properties prior to the pandemic, and its customer base largely relocated to the company's Santa Fe property after casinos reopened. The company announced in August 2020 that the reopening of closed properties, including the Fiestas, was dependent on demand, noting that the closures may be permanent. Texas Station and Fiesta Rancho had a combined total of nearly 3,200 slot machines, and North Las Vegas saw decreased gaming revenue following their closure, while most of the state's other gaming markets experienced record profits during 2021.

Station announced on July 15, 2022 that it would demolish the Fiesta properties and Texas Station, and subsequently sell the land. Analysts viewed the demolition plan as a defensive move to prevent future competition from gaming rivals. North Las Vegas mayor John Lee was hopeful that the land would be redeveloped as commercial space. Pat Spearman, a mayoral candidate for North Las Vegas, had suggested saving Fiesta Rancho and repurposing it as a skills training center for people who lost their jobs to technology. Demolition began in April 2023. The Pepsi Ice Arena remained after demolition and would continue operations until Station sold the land. The Fiesta's parking garage was also left intact.

City officials had considered purchasing the Fiesta and Texas Station properties for redevelopment as affordable housing. However, the purchase price was deemed too high. In July 2023, plans were announced by Agora Realty & Management to redevelop the two properties as a mixed-use project, known as Hylo Park. The former Fiesta land would include a 150-room hotel, retail space, and two new ice rinks, while the existing rink would be converted into a field house. Construction, to be done in phases, is expected to begin in early 2024 and conclude by late 2025.

== Awards ==
From 1996 to 2000, the Fiesta provided scholarships, known as the Fiesta Casino/Hotel Scholarship Awards, to two local students each year.

During the 1990s, the Garduño's restaurant was a five-time winner of the Las Vegas Review-Journal's "Best of Las Vegas" award for Mexican restaurants. In 1997, the casino won the Las Vegas Review-Journal's staff poll for "Best-Paying Slots" and "Best Video Poker," while readers named the casino "Best Slot Club." In 2003, the Fiesta Rancho was chosen by readers and staff of the Las Vegas Review-Journal for "Best Video Poker". In 2006, the Fiesta Rancho was chosen by the Las Vegas Review-Journal for its "Best Blackjack" award. From 2009 to 2011, Fiesta Rancho and Fiesta Henderson were voted "Best Video Poker" by readers of the Las Vegas Review-Journal. The Fiesta casinos were also chosen by the Las Vegas Review-Journal for its 2011 "Best Bingo" award.

== Gallery ==
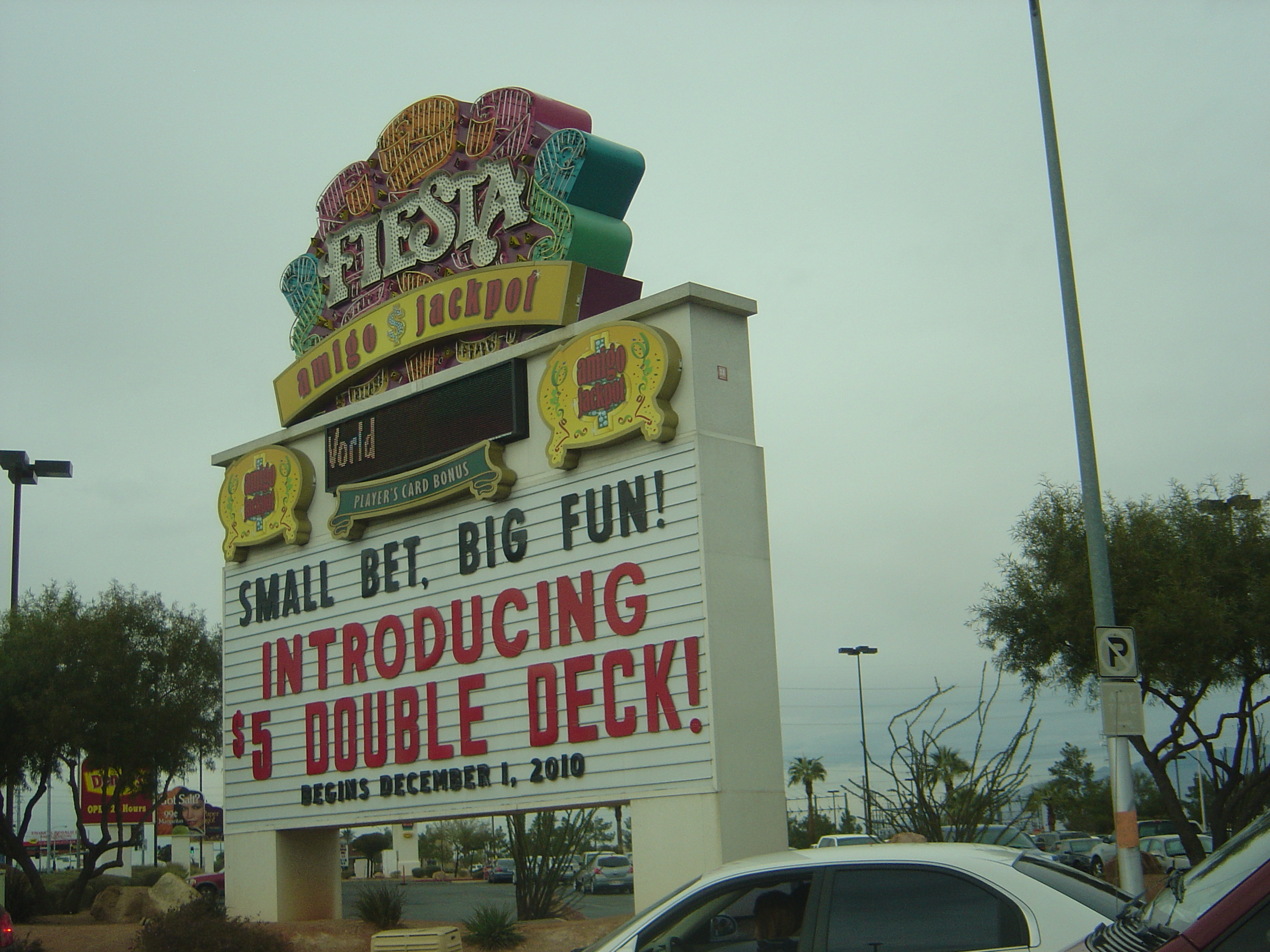
Intersection sign in 2010

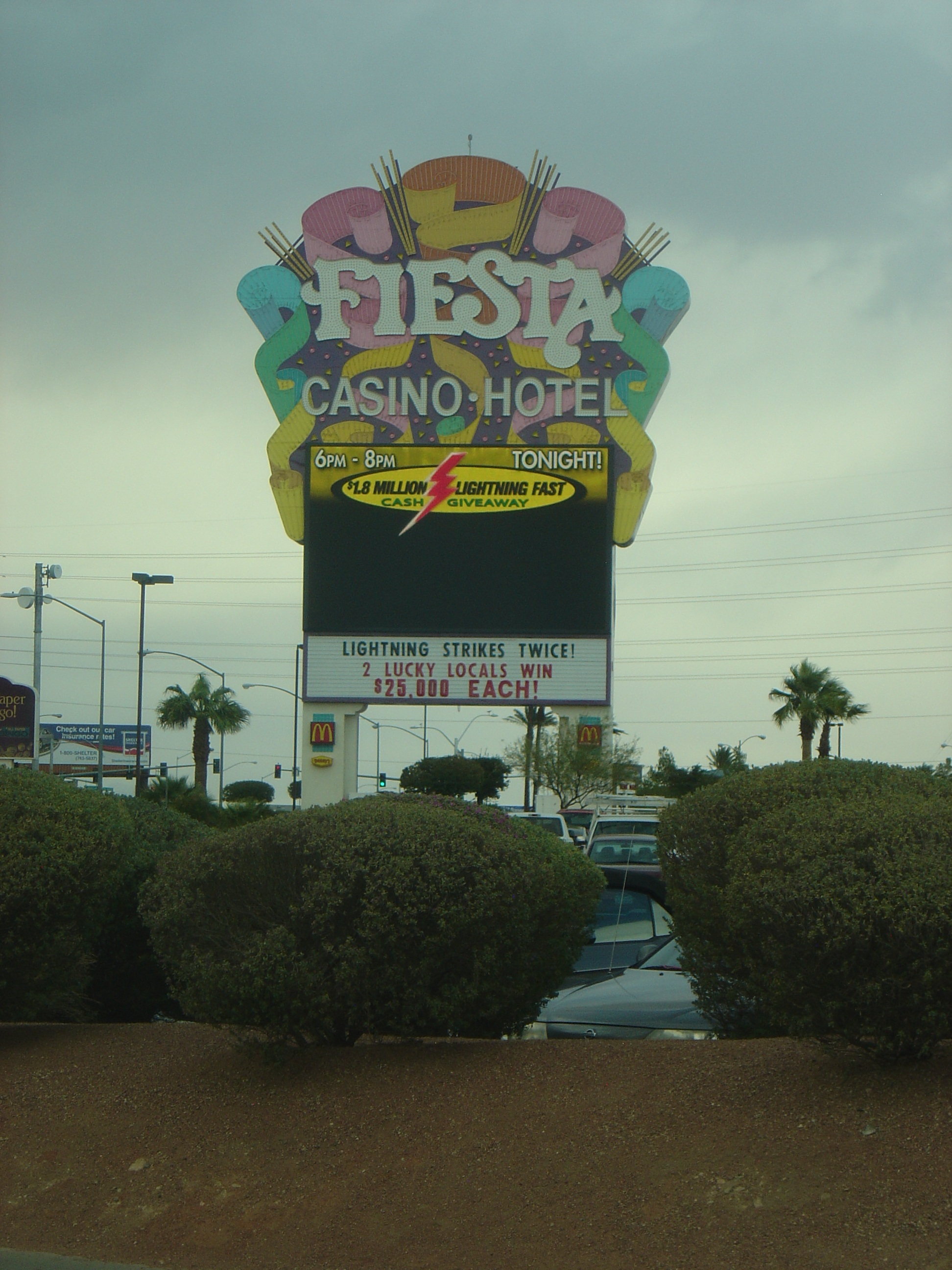
Main roadside sign in 2010

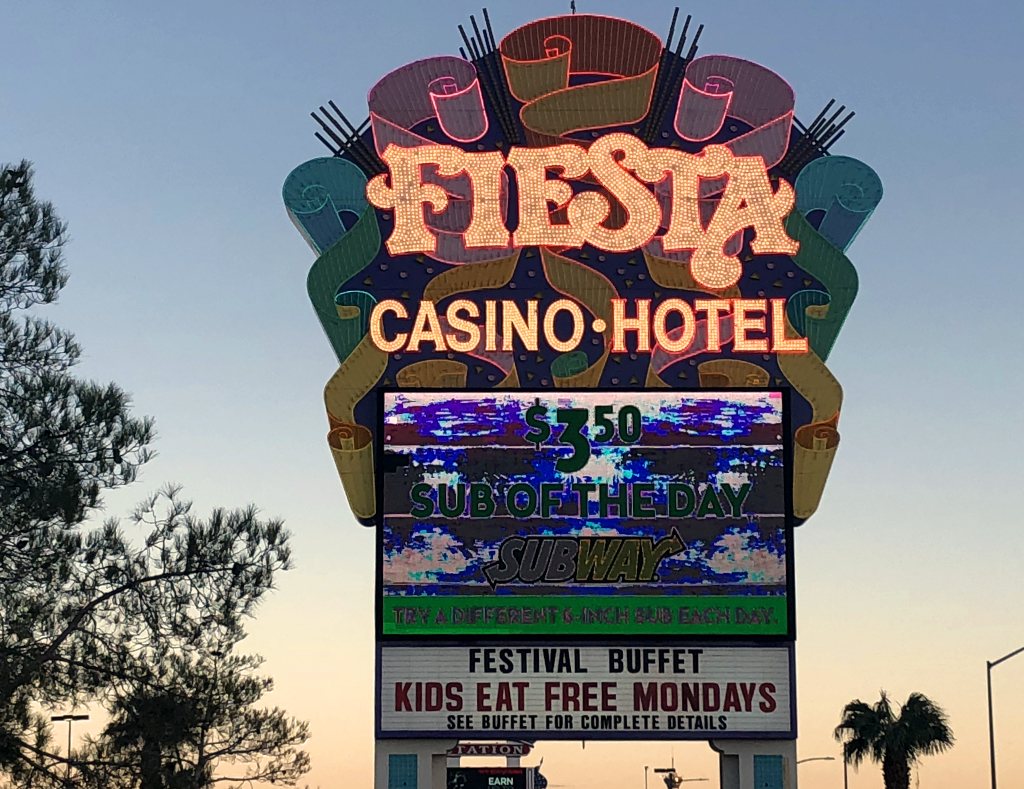
Roadside sign in 2018
