= Palms Casino Resort =

Casino resort in Las Vegas, Nevada

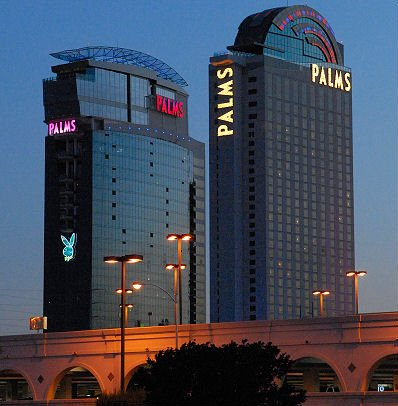
- Palms hotel towers in 2007
- Interactive map of Palms Casino Resort
- Location: Paradise, Nevada, U.S.; 4321 Flamingo Road; 36°6′52″N 115°11′42″W
- Opened: November 15, 2001; 24 years ago
- No. of rooms: 703
- Gaming space: 94,065 sq ft (8,738.9 m^{2})
- Signature attractions: Brenden Theatres
- Notable restaurants: Alize (2001–17); A.Y.C.E Buffet; N9NE (2001–17); Garduño's (2001–13); Scotch 80 Prime; Tim Ho Wan
- Casino type: Land-based
- Owner: Yuhaaviatam of San Manuel Nation
- Architect: Jerde Partnership International
- Renovated in: 2005–2006, 2012–2013, 2017–2019, 2022
- Website: palms.com

Palms Casino Resort is a hotel and casino located near the Las Vegas Strip in Paradise, Nevada, United States. It is owned and operated by the Yuhaaviatam of San Manuel Nation. It includes 703 rooms and a 94,065 sq ft (8,738.9 m^{2}) casino. It was originally owned by the Maloof family, and primarily overseen by George Maloof. He purchased the site in 1997, and construction began three years later. The Palms opened on November 15, 2001, with Station Casinos and The Greenspun Corporation as minority owners. It included a casino, restaurants, nightclubs, and a 42-story hotel. The resort catered to local residents and tourists, and also became popular among celebrities and young adults. It has made several television appearances, and was the main setting for the 2002 reality television show The Real World: Las Vegas, which contributed to its fame.

A second hotel structure, the 40-story Fantasy Tower, was opened in 2005. A recording studio was also added, making the Palms the first casino resort to include such a facility. The resort also includes a movie theater, which has hosted several film premieres. A Playboy Club opened in the Fantasy Tower in 2006, becoming the first such club to open in several decades. A music venue, the Pearl Concert Theater, was added in 2007. Palms Place, a high-rise condo hotel, was opened on the property a year later.

The Palms experienced financial difficulty during the Great Recession, and was sold in 2011, to Texas Pacific Group and Leonard Green & Partners. The Maloof family retained a two-percent interest in the Palms. A $50 million renovation took place in 2012, to help reinvigorate the resort's popularity. Red Rock Resorts, the parent company of Station Casinos, purchased the Palms for $312.5 million in 2016. The company launched a $620 million renovation which included new restaurants and nightclubs, but the changes failed to restore the resort's past prominence.

The Palms and other Nevada casinos were closed in March 2020, amid the COVID-19 pandemic. In 2021, Red Rock sold the resort for $650 million to the San Manuel Band of Mission Indians, which reopened it on April 27, 2022. Under its new ownership, the Palms is the first Las Vegas resort to have a Native American owner.

== History ==
In 1997, George Maloof purchased a 31.5-acre (12.7 ha) property on Flamingo Road, west of the Las Vegas Strip. He paid less than $1 million per acre. At the time, he had no immediate plans for the site. Maloof was the owner of the Fiesta hotel-casino in North Las Vegas. His initial plan was to grow the Fiesta name with a new location on the Flamingo Road site, but he later decided that the property would be better suited for a hybrid locals/tourist resort. The property was initially divided across two parcels, with Wynn Road running between them. In June 1999, work was underway to realign Wynn Road, allowing for construction to eventually begin on a new hotel-casino that Maloof was planning.

In July 2000, Maloof agreed to sell the Fiesta to Station Casinos. Later that month, Station and The Greenspun Corporation both agreed to purchase a separate six-percent stake in Maloof's upcoming resort. The Maloof family owned the remaining 88 percent. Preliminary work on the property began on July 24, 2000. Two and a half months later, Maloof announced that the resort would be named the Palms. It was scheduled to open on December 12, 2001, initially with 470 rooms, although Maloof planned to eventually expand to 2,000 within 10 years. The project was designed by Jerde Partnership International, based in Los Angeles. KGA Architecture served as the executive architect. When having the Palms designed, Maloof relied on customer feedback that he had received at the Fiesta. High ceilings were added at the Palms to reduce cigarette smoke, and a large number of restrooms were added as well. The casino would also feature an abundance of video poker and loose slot machines, like the Fiesta.

Perini Building Company was chosen as the general contractor, after working on an expansion of the Fiesta in 1999. An official groundbreaking ceremony was held for the Palms on October 24, 2000. A fire occurred on the lower floors of the hotel tower in April 2001, during construction. The fire, apparently caused by welding, caused $75,000 in minimal damage and would not delay construction. The 42-story hotel tower was topped off on June 7, 2001. It was originally planned as a 40-story building, but the floor count was increased to beat out the nearby Rio hotel, which stood at 41 stories. The project's budget was $265 million, although improvements to a pool and spa courtyard added another $3 million in expenses. The Palms was partially financed with a $55 million credit line, from First Security Bank and Wells Fargo.

Construction proceeded slightly ahead of schedule. A few days prior to the September 11 attacks, resort officials announced that the Palms would open one month earlier than scheduled, to take advantage of the busy Thanksgiving weekend. After the attacks, Maloof planned to proceed with the opening, despite the potential impact on tourism. The Palms had already hired most of its 2,500 employees. To help promote the opening, Maloof invited high rollers and Hollywood agents to a party at Hugh Hefner's Playboy Mansion, featuring faux gaming tables and images of the resort. The party was aimed at attracting celebrities to the resort. In addition, Maloof mailed offers to Las Vegas residents, hoping to sign up 50,000 members for the new Palms slot club. He also made promotional appearances on local news stations and The Today Show. The hotel portion would be marketed in Arizona, California, and Maloof's home state of New Mexico. Maloof also planned to promote the resort through his basketball team, the Sacramento Kings. The resort's opening was eagerly anticipated.

=== Opening and early years ===
The Palms opened to thousands of invited guests and VIPs on November 15, 2001, at 7:00 p.m. Notable attendees included Pamela Anderson, Matt Dillon, Nevada governor Kenny Guinn, Samuel L. Jackson, Joe Pesci, Tara Reid, Dennis Rodman, Martin Sheen and Charlize Theron. The resort opened to the public at 11:00 p.m.

Maloof served as the public face for the resort. He planned for the Palms to appeal to the same young demographic as the nearby Hard Rock Hotel. He also hoped that its location, near Interstate 15, would make it appealing to local residents. He considered the Palms close enough to the Strip to attract tourists, but far enough to bring in locals, who generally avoid the Strip. The Palms would also benefit from the nearby Rio and Gold Coast resorts, which were popular among locals.

Maloof said he wanted to create "the ultimate party hotel in the world". The resort included various restaurants, a nightclub, and a 14-screen movie theater. The property's east side was targeted at tourists, containing the hotel tower, nightclubs, and several restaurants. The west side included locals-oriented amenities, such as a food court and the movie theater. The latter was part of the Brenden Theatres chain. The theater opened shortly after the rest of the resort, on November 21, 2001. It was the first Brenden Theatres location to open in Las Vegas. Michael Morton, the brother of Hard Rock Hotel owner Peter Morton, operated several venues at the Palms, including a nightclub, a steakhouse, and the pool area. They were operated through Morton's company, N9NE Group. The Palms also had 9,000 sq ft (840 m^{2}) of convention space. In subsequent years, the resort would add other features, such as a medical center for employees and the public, and a tattoo parlor by Carey Hart and John Huntington.

Maloof was satisfied with the Palms' early financial results, although local residents were generally not impressed at first, complaining of issues such as cramped casino aisles and loud music. Maloof managed to attract locals by launching a promotional campaign, introducing more full-pay video poker machines, and removing some machines for more space. During the day, the property was frequented by older local residents, while younger tourists would arrive later in the evening. The resort was popular with nightclub-goers and celebrities.

By mid-2003, Maloof was planning to eventually add a second hotel tower, due to the strong success of the resort. Later in 2003, the Palms hosted a 50th anniversary celebration for the magazine Playboy and renamed a nearby street as Hugh Hefner Drive. A year later, the Palms partnered with Playboy to eventually use the magazine's name at the resort.

In 2004, a pair of identical 26-year-old twins won a resort contest to become Palm Girls. They went on to represent the Palms through television appearances and in printed media, and their faces were later featured on casino chips for the resort.

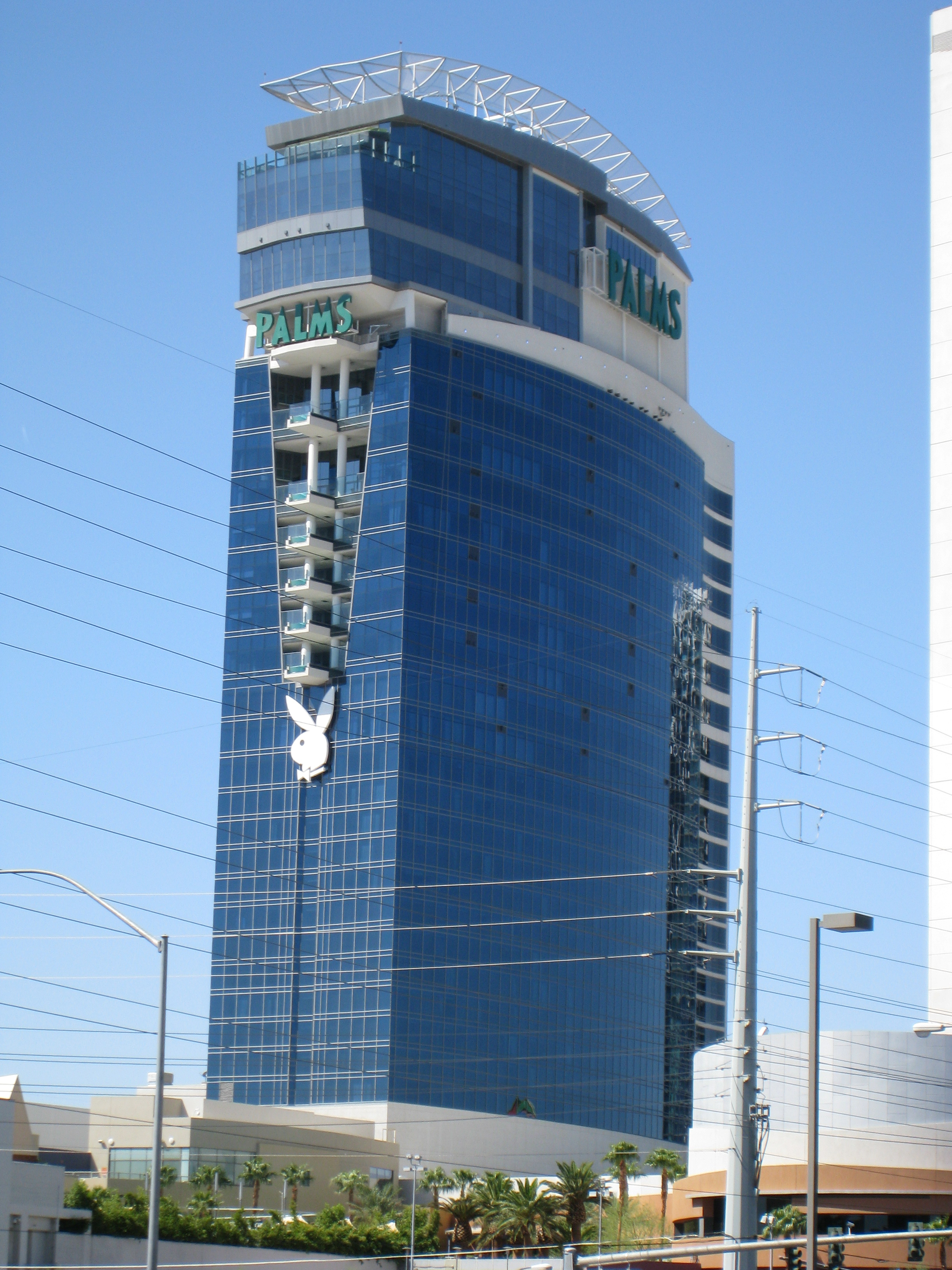
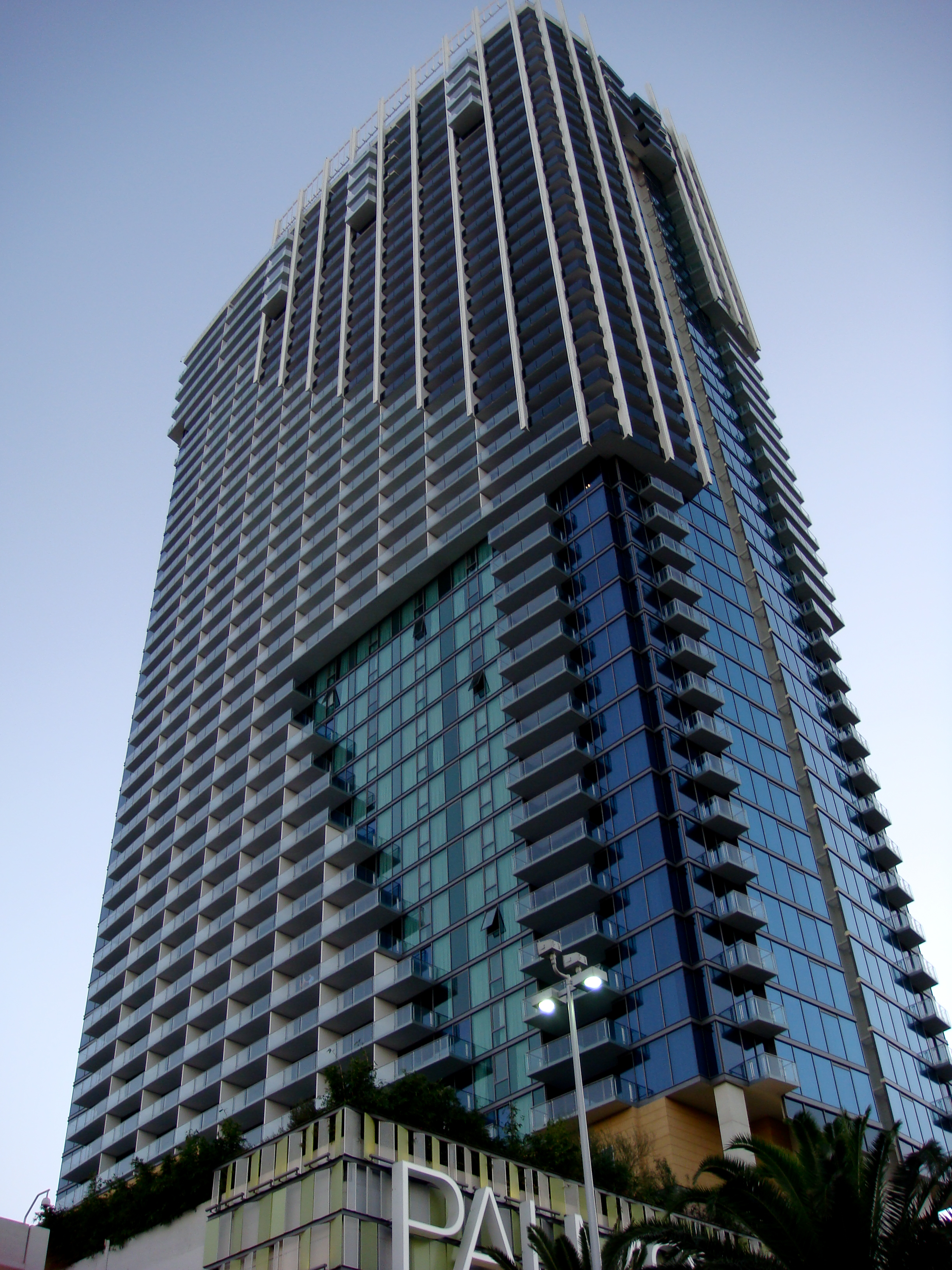
Fantasy Tower and Palms Place in 2008

Construction of the new hotel tower was underway in 2004, with Whiting-Turner as general contractor. It would eventually open as the Fantasy Tower. It was also designed by Jerde Partnership, and was built south of the original tower. The Fantasy Tower began opening in October 2005, with various suites. The tower officially celebrated its opening in May 2006. The Playboy Club opened in the tower five months later. The Fantasy Tower also added a recording studio for musicians.

A music venue, the Pearl Concert Theater, was opened in early 2007. By that point, revenue from local residents had dropped from 80 to 65 percent, with tourists becoming more prevalent at the resort. Later in 2007, Richard Branson, wearing a body harness, jumped from the Fantasy Tower in a stunt to promote his Virgin America airline.

A high-rise condo hotel, known as Palms Place, was opened in 2008. It was the third and final tower to be built on the Palms property. That year, the Palms began to suffer financially due to the economic effects of the Great Recession.

By 2010, the Palms had accumulated 661 building code violations, which Maloof attributed to significant expansion of the resort over the years. In mid-2010, Maloof reluctantly agreed to have a scent distributed through the casino, in an effort to compete with rivals that were doing the same. However, the scent was discontinued after less than a month, due to negative customer reception.

In September 2010, N9NE Group sued the Palms after the resort tried to fire Andy Belmonti, a N9NE executive who was responsible for overseeing the company's venues at the property. Belmonti had recently began work on a new restaurant for Morton at the Wynn Las Vegas resort, and the Palms alleged that profits had declined since then, arguing that Belmonti had neglected his duties at the Palms. It was also alleged that N9NE used Palms money to pay off several employee lawsuits, without informing the resort. The Palms countersued and further alleged that Morton had misused resort money and staff for his own purposes, including house parties. The suit also accused Belmonti of carrying out a financial cover-up, and alleged that another executive had escorted underage women into 21-and-up venues at the resort. The Palms and a group of N9NE investors sought to remove Morton and Belmonti, who denied the accusations. Both sides settled in January 2011, with N9NE departing the Palms. The resort would take over operations of the company's former venues there.

=== Ownership changes ===
In 2010, Texas Pacific Group (TPG) purchased a portion of the Palms' $380 million bank debt. The Palms began missing loan payments that year, due to poor economic conditions. In January 2011, Maloof was negotiating with TPG and Leonard Green & Partners for the companies to gain a controlling interest in the Palms, after they had acquired most of a Palms loan in 2010. In June 2011, the companies announced a partnership called TPG Opportunity Partners, which would convert the Palms' debt into equity. TPG and Leonard Green would each own a 49-percent share of the resort, while the Maloof family's ownership would be reduced to 2 percent, with the option to eventually purchase up to 20 percent. George Maloof would continue to oversee operations as chairman, and he said that little would change at the property. Station Casinos and Greenspun were no longer involved as minority owners.

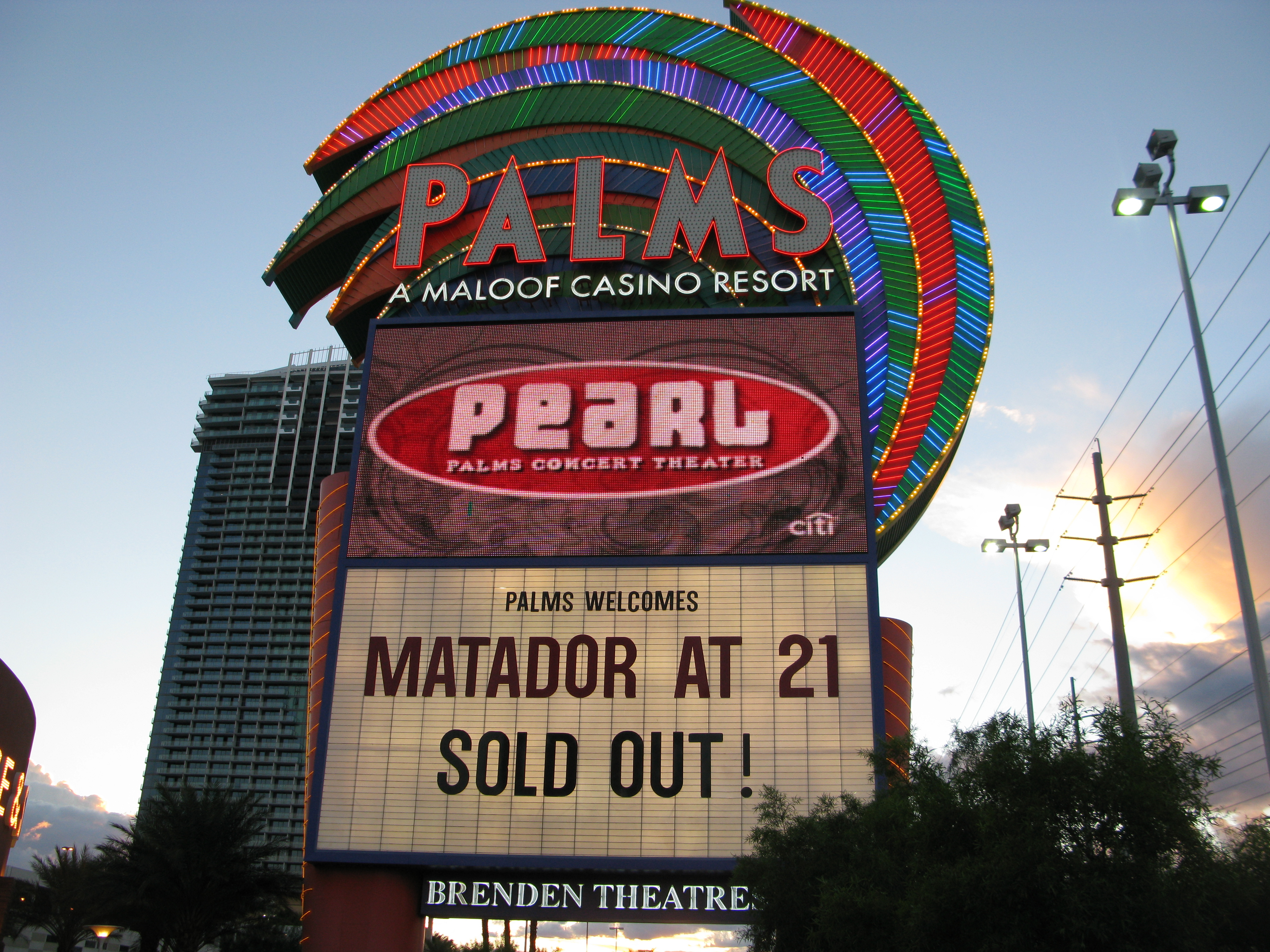
Palms roadside sign in 2010

The Nevada Gaming Commission approved the sale in November 2011, and a renovation was planned for the resort. A subdued celebration was held for the Palms' 10th anniversary, honoring its employees and local residents rather than celebrities. In an effort to regain the resort's popularity, a $50 million renovation began in mid-2012, incorporating a modern design by Klai Juba Architects. The resort's average customer now ranged from 30 to 50 years old, and the renovations were designed to reflect this older demographic. The Palms' roadside neon sign had advertised the property as "a Maloof casino resort" since its opening. As part of the renovations, the Maloofs' name was eventually removed from the sign.

In September 2012, the resort took over ownership of the venues previously overseen by N9NE, including nightclubs. The Palms was subsequently fined $1 million by the Nevada Gaming Commission, after an investigation found that nightclub employees – under N9NE's management – had offered drugs and prostitutes to undercover officers.

In March 2016, TPG and Leonard Green were considering a sale of the resort. Red Rock Resorts, the parent company of Station Casinos, announced two months later that it would purchase the Palms for $312.5 million. The purchase was finalized in October 2016, and the company began making changes to the resort. In late 2017, plans were announced for a $485 million renovation that would include a hotel remodel, and new restaurants and clubs. Station's CEO Frank Fertitta III said, "We were partners in this property for nearly 10 years. We have a history of understanding what the Palms property is capable of doing. It lacked a lot of tender loving care." The cost of the renovation project eventually increased to $620 million. It would cover numerous areas of the resort. A five-story parking garage was increased by two floors as part of the renovations. The original roadside sign was disassembled in February 2018, and eventually replaced by a fully digital one.

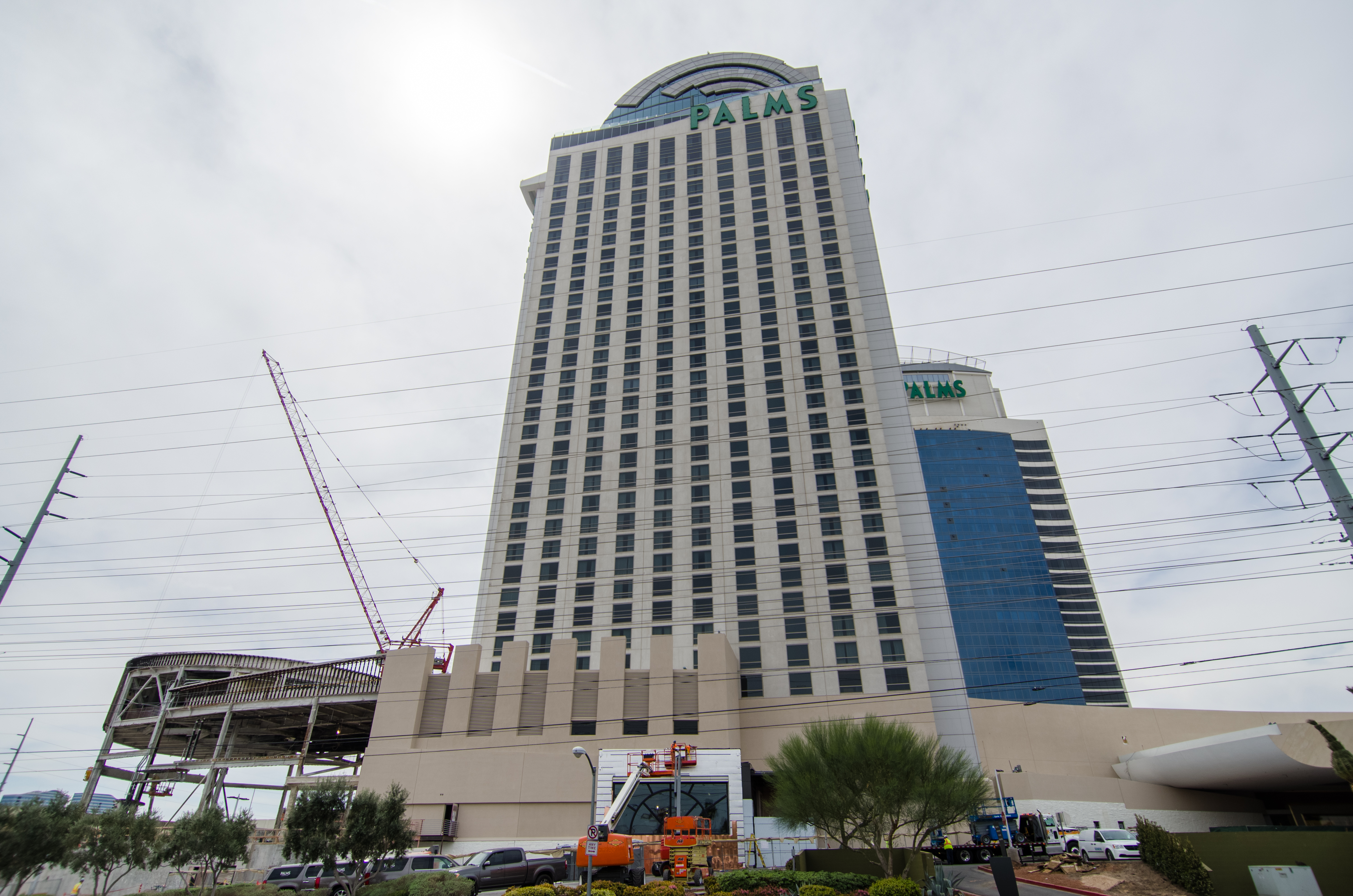
The Palms during renovations, April 2018

Portions of the renovated resort were unveiled starting in May 2018. Station planned to target locals and tourists while offering value-oriented amenities. The company aimed to restore the Palms' popularity. Fertitta and his brother were avid art collectors, and artwork was spread throughout the renovated resort. Red Rock had partnered with Tao Group, which was to open a new nightclub and restaurants at the Palms. However, the partnership was terminated later in 2018. Under Red Rock's ownership, the Palms failed to regain its popularity. Kaos, a new nightclub, was opened in 2019. It was meant as a major attraction, but instead was closed seven months later.

Nevada casinos were ordered to close on March 18, 2020, due to the COVID-19 pandemic and its effects on the state. Casinos there began reopening a few months later, although the Palms remained closed as of March 2021, while Red Rock waited for a rebound of the economy. On May 4, 2021, Red Rock announced that it would sell the Palms to the Yuhaaviatam of San Manuel Nation for $650 million, pending regulatory approvals expected later in the year. Analysts believed that the resort still had potential. The band expected to focus more on gaming than on nightlife, a departure from previous owners. Local residents would be the primary target demographic.

The sale was finalized on December 17, 2021, and the Palms became the first Las Vegas resort to have a Native American owner. The band began a hiring campaign to prepare for reopening, ultimately employing more than 900 people, including some former workers. The resort's employee facilities were upgraded, but the band otherwise made few changes to the property in light of Red Rock's renovation a few years earlier.

The Palms reopened on the night of April 27, 2022, with live music and a fireworks show. The Brenden Theatres facility was renovated and reopened two days later.

== Features ==
=== Casino ===
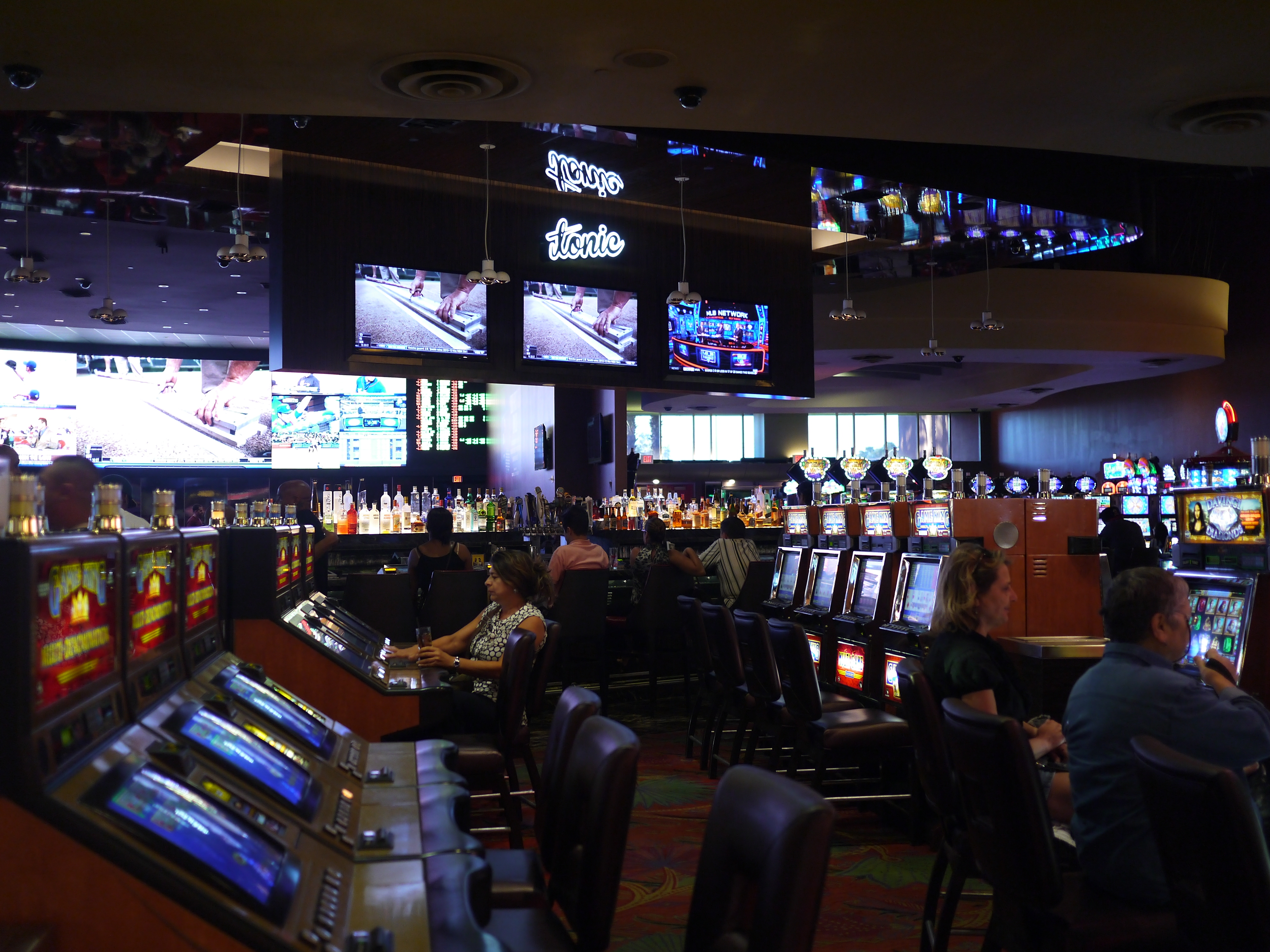
Casino floor in 2013

The Palms casino is 94,065 sq ft (8,738.9 m^{2}). Upon opening, it had 2,200 slot machines, keno, bingo, and 55 table games, including blackjack and poker. It also featured a sportsbook with seating for more than 200 people. Unlike certain other properties, the Palms sportsbook was built in the center of the casino, intended as a convenient location for locals to find. The book initially did not accept bets on NBA games, due to the Maloof family's ownership of the Sacramento Kings. The betting ban on NBA games was lifted seven years after the Palms' opening.

The resort's 2005-06 expansion included a two-floor high-end gaming pit named The Mint and Top of the Mint, referencing a former downtown property by the same name. In 2011, the casino floor unveiled its Playboy Party Pit, featuring six blackjack tables that were overseen by Playboy Bunny dealers. The pit was part of a $5 million casino renovation, which included 200 new slot machines. The casino also opened its Slot Emporium, featuring 50 of its most popular slot machines.

A new sportsbook, operated by Cantor Gaming, was opened in May 2012. It measured 9,840 sq ft (914 m^{2}), and included a poker room, which eventually closed in 2014. The casino floor was renovated in 2018 to include 40 new table games, which offered phone-charging outlets for players. The casino floor was updated again for its 2022 reopening, with a new, open layout and new slot machines. A 100-seat William Hill sportsbook was also added.

=== Hotel ===
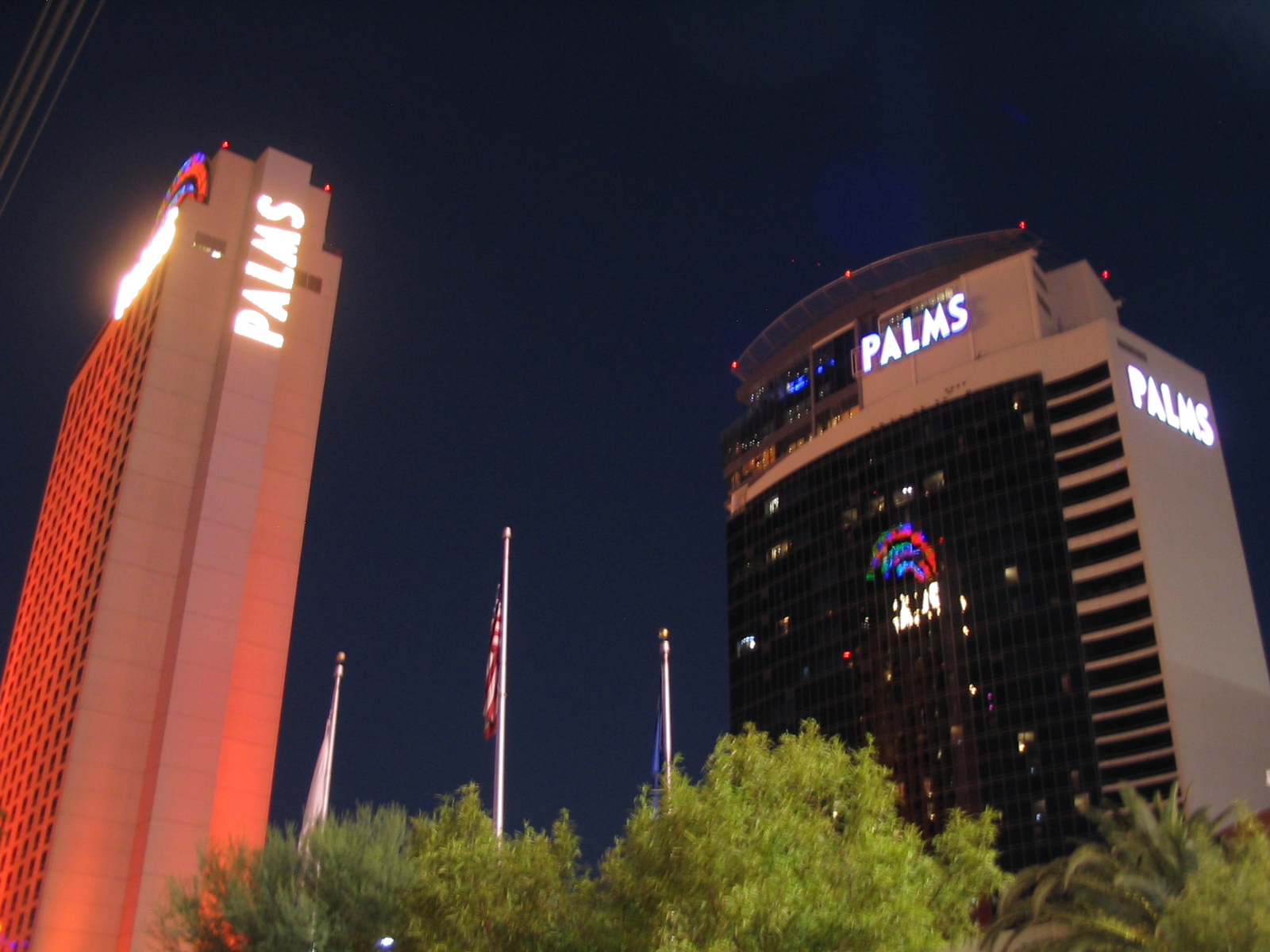
Palms hotel towers in 2006

The Palms has 703 hotel rooms, spread across two towers. It originally opened with a 42-story tower containing 455 rooms, a small number compared to resorts on the nearby Strip. In an effort to attract basketball players, the hotel included 24 NBA rooms, featuring beds and showers that were longer and higher than normal. The hotel was also featured in the reality television series The Real World: Las Vegas, and the suite created for the show was later opened to the public. In 2003, the Palms unveiled bachelor and bachelorette party suites, both featuring stripper poles and other amenities. The rooms had previously been used by the production crew for The Real World.

In October 2005, the Palms opened its Hardwood Suite in the new Fantasy Tower. The suite rented for $50,000 a night, and included half a basketball court, a locker room, pool and poker tables, and optional cheerleaders. The two-story suite was one of 11 to open in the Fantasy Tower, which was still under construction at the time. The suites ranged from 1,400 to 10,000 square feet, and were located across the 25th and 26th floors. Six Sky Villas opened in April 2006, starting on the 27th floor of the Fantasy Tower. They ranged from 7,000 to 10,000 square feet, and included fireplaces and Jacuzzi spas.

Before the 40-story Fantasy Tower was completed, the Palms had 430 rooms. The new tower added 347. The tower was completed in October 2006, when it unveiled the 9,000 sq ft (840 m^{2}) Hugh Hefner Sky Villa, a two-story suite on the 34th and 35th floors. Hefner was the first guest to stay in the suite, which was inspired by his Playboy Mansions in Los Angeles and Chicago.

In 2009, the Palms opened its Barbie Suite, which rented for $4,000 a night. The 2,350 sq ft (218 m^{2}) suite featured an abundance of pink coloring and was inspired by the Barbie doll. As of 2012, the Hugh Hefner suite was one of the most expensive suites in the world, renting for $35,000 to $40,000 a night. The original hotel tower was renovated in 2012 and named as the Ivory Tower.

As part of the 2018 renovations, the Fantasy Tower rooms were updated for the first time since their opening. The six Sky Villa suites were also updated. The former Hugh Hefner suite was redesigned by architects Bentel & Bentel in collaboration with artist Damien Hirst and renamed as the Empathy Suite. The two-story 9,000 sq ft (840 m^{2}) suite included various artwork and a curved bar for 13 people. It rented for a two-night minimum price of $200,000, making it the most expensive suite in the world.

=== Nightclubs ===
On the ground floor, the Palms included Rain in the Desert, a three-story club spanning 25,000 sq ft (2,300 m^{2}). Guests would enter through a gold-mirrored tunnel, accompanied by fog and lights. The interior of the club featured a center stage surrounded by a moat, and a nearby three-story waterfall was used as a projection screen. Rain was developed by Michael Morton and Scott DeGraff, and was opened on November 16, 2001. It included a showroom, and opened with a concert by Macy Gray, although performances by musicians were not intended to take place on a regular basis. DJ Paul Oakenfold began a residency at Rain in 2008, and DJ AM performed there until his death in 2009.

Moon, a nightclub located at the top of the Fantasy Tower, opened on October 6, 2006. It measured 12,500 sq ft (1,160 m^{2}) and had a retractable roof, an idea previously planned for Rain. The roof cost approximately $1 million. As with Rain, DJs also performed at Moon.

Rain was closed in 2012, as part of the resort's ongoing renovations at the time. Moon was closed in 2014. Apex Social Club opened in 2018, taking the place of Ghostbar. It offered various musical entertainers, including DJs, as well as weekly parties.

In April 2019, the Palms opened Kaos, a 73,000 sq ft (6,800 m^{2}) dayclub and a 29,000 sq ft (2,700 m^{2}) nightclub, replacing the space formerly occupied by Rain. The dayclub included several pools, and featured a 60-foot headless bronze statue by artist Damien Hirst called "Demon With Bowl". Kaos offered frequent performances, and a 270-foot-tall LED screen – the largest in Las Vegas – was added onto the Palm's Ivory Tower, broadcasting performances to clubgoers and passersby on the street.

Later in 2019, Kaos was briefly closed to allow for the addition of a 70-foot dome of transparent panels. It was placed over one of the pools, allowing for year-round swimming. The addition was named Kaos Dome, and the club reopened on October 31, 2019. However, Kaos was abruptly closed five days later, due to the high cost of securing entertainers. Red Rock Resorts stated that the space would remain open as the guest pool area and that it would be used for special events, while the company evaluated future use for the venue. The club had lost nearly $50 million. During its run, the club featured residencies from various musical artists. Notable performers at Kaos had included Cardi B and Marshmello, the latter of whom had signed a $60 million two-year residency deal. DJ Kaskade had also been signed to the club, and filed a federal lawsuit against the resort after its closing left him without a venue.

=== Restaurants ===
The Palms opened with various restaurants, including N9NE, a steakhouse by N9NE Group. It had seating for 175 people, including a 16-seat caviar bar. An Asian restaurant, Little Buddha, was partially inspired by the Buddha Bar in Paris. Another restaurant, Garduño's, was carried over from the Fiesta hotel-casino. The Palms location was spread across two floors. A food court with a handful of eateries was built near the resort's movie theater. A French restaurant, Alize, was built on the top floor of the hotel tower and was mostly glass-enclosed for views of the Las Vegas Valley. The restaurant featured nearly 1,000 types of wine, and was named after the French word for trade winds. Other restaurants included the 500-seat Festival Market Buffet, and the 24/7 Sunrise Cafe.

The Bistro Buffet opened in 2007. Four years later, the Palms added a dim sum restaurant known as Cathay House, which had previously operated across the street. Maloof arranged for the restaurant's relocation after realizing that many Palms customers were leaving the resort to eat there.

In 2013, Garduño's was replaced by a sports bar and restaurant known as Heraea, with females as a specific target demographic. It was operated by the One Group, and was added as part of the resort's $50 million renovation. Heraea was unsuccessful and closed later in 2013, with the Palms taking over management of the space. Little Buddha was to be replaced by a new restaurant and lounge called Xishi, also by the One Group. However, these plans were canceled. The former Heraea space reopened in 2015, as the world's largest Hooters restaurant. The 15,200 sq ft (1,410 m^{2}) restaurant spanned across two stories.

When Red Rock purchased the Palms, the company aimed to upgrade the resort's restaurants, hoping to attract an upper-class clientele. This included the removal of Hooters and the addition of a new restaurant by celebrity chefs such as Bobby Flay, Michael Symon, and Chris Santos. N9NE had been a popular staple at the resort since it debuted, but it was closed in 2017 amid the restaurant overhaul. It was replaced by Scotch 80 Prime, a fine-dining restaurant. It included a $3 million collection of whiskies, and artwork by Andy Warhol, Jean-Michel Basquiat, and Damien Hirst.

The former Bistro Buffet was reopened as the A.Y.C.E. (All You Can Eat) Buffet at the end of 2017, while Alize marked its closing after 16 years. It was replaced by a new restaurant from chef Marc Vetri. Flay opened his new restaurant, Shark, in 2019. A 5,000 sq ft (460 m^{2}) restaurant, Greene St. Kitchen, was also opened by chef Lanny Chin and offered a variety of global dishes. A Tim Ho Wan dim sum restaurant opened later in 2019.

The Palms reopened in 2022 with most of the same restaurants, as well as a new café. The A.Y.C.E. Buffet was kept, leaving the Palms among few locals casinos in Las Vegas to still offer a buffet after the COVID-19 pandemic. La Popular CDMX, a Mexican restaurant that included all-day breakfast and a taco bar, opened in 2023, replacing Shark after its pandemic-related closure three years earlier. It was the third U.S. location for La Popular, and closed a year after its debut.

In August 2025, Palms announced the closure of both Mabel’s Bar & Q and Vetri Cucina.

=== Playboy Club ===
In October 2004, the Palms signed a licensing deal with Playboy to use the brand name. The Playboy Club opened in the Fantasy Tower on October 6, 2006. It was the first new Playboy Club to open in more than two decades. A nationwide search was conducted for Playboy Bunnies to staff the club, which was a joint venture between Playboy Enterprises, the Palms, and N9NE. The opening was featured in Hefner's reality television series The Girls Next Door.

It was the first nightclub to include gambling, a feature that required the rewriting of Nevada law. The club had 10 blackjack tables, and was the first casino to charge an admission fee. Maloof worked with Nevada regulators for more than three years to get the law rewritten. The club included a bar with 10,000 diamond-shaped crystals, and VIP rooms with mirrored walls and Playboy pinball machines. Through escalators, the club was linked with the Moon nightclub located above, and the Nove Italiano restaurant below. The Fantasy Tower's exterior featured the Playboy bunny logo to promote the club.

The Playboy Club closed in June 2012, as Playboy and the Palms wanted to pursue new opportunities. The club was replaced by a lounge called the View.

=== Bars ===
Upon opening in 2001, the top of the hotel tower featured Ghostbar, which overlooked the Las Vegas Valley. It included an outdoor balcony with a section of glass floor, allowing visitors to peer below. Ghostbar was developed by Morton and DeGraff. Initially, it was only going to be open three nights a week. DeGraff said that this led to the bar's name: "We thought of it as an apparition, a ghost that would appear on Thursday and disappear on Sunday." An iridescent 30-foot ghost was depicted across most of the bar's ceiling. The interior also featured floor-to-ceiling windows for views of the Las Vegas skyline. Ghostbar measured 8,000 sq ft (740 m^{2}). It had capacity for 325 people, and featured DJ music. Ghostbar remained popular a decade after its opening, especially among celebrities. In 2011, it started operating during the day to attract pool-goers. Red Rock closed Ghostbar in 2017, replacing it a year later with a nightclub known as Apex Social Club. Ghostbar reopened in 2022, under San Manuel's ownership.

In its early years, the casino also featured the Lounge, which served as an entertainment venue for acts such as Hollywood Comedy Tour, the Playboy Comedy Club, and singer Matt Goss. The View lounge opened atop the Fantasy Tower in 2013. In addition to views of the Las Vegas Valley, the lounge also offered a variety of board games.

In 2018, a new ground-floor bar was added in the middle of the casino. It included a triptych art piece consisting of a 13-foot tiger shark, divided across three tanks. Both the bar and art piece were designed by artist Damien Hirst. Another bar, Mr. Coco, was also added on the third floor of the Fantasy Tower. It featured a collection of artwork.

=== Studio at the Palms ===
In April 2004, Maloof announced plans to add a recording studio to the resort, after a year and a half of planning. Two studios – Studio X and Studio Y – were ultimately opened in December 2005, built at a cost of $6 million. Known as the Studio at the Palms, it is the only recording facility to be located within a casino resort. Certain hotel suites, as well as nightclubs and the Pearl theater, also had recording capabilities. The studio was overseen by Zoe and Pat Thrall.

The facility has served various musicians, including Celine Dion, Usher, Beyoncé, Eminem, Dr. Dre, 50 Cent, Chevelle, and The Killers. Shortly before his death, Michael Jackson and his children lived at the Palms hotel for months while he recorded a new album at the resort, including the song "Hold My Hand".

=== Pearl Concert Theater ===
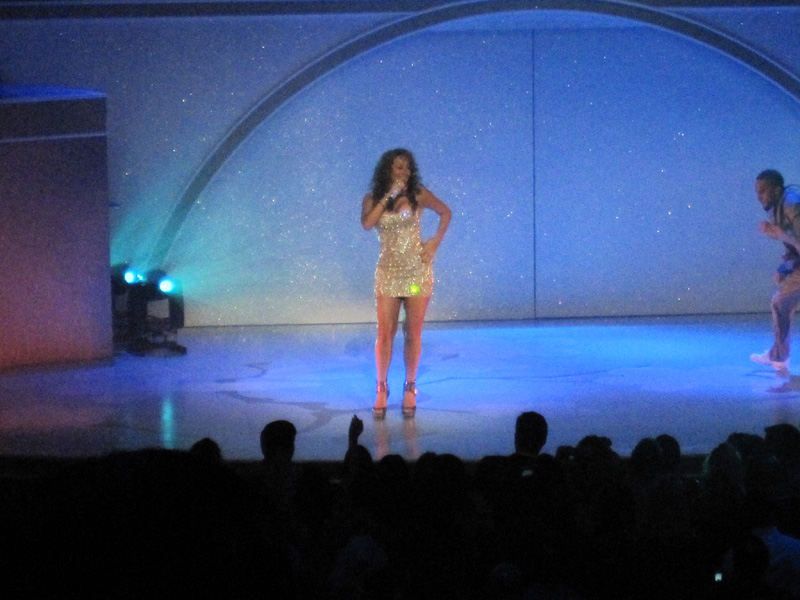
Mariah Carey seen performing at the Pearl Concert Theater

In March 2005, Maloof announced that the Palms would add a concert theater to better compete with the Hard Rock Hotel. The Pearl Concert Theater was built out in a crescent shape, with the furthest seat being only 120 feet from the stage. The venue spanned three floors and had seating for 2,400 people. Three screens from the resort's movie theater had to be relocated to make way for the Pearl. The venue was wired into the Palm's recording studio, allowing performers to record live albums.

The Pearl opened on March 17, 2007, with a concert by Evanescence. The official grand opening took place on April 21, 2007, with a concert by Gwen Stefani. The Pearl would go on to host other entertainers, including Lady Gaga, Lady Antebellum, and Billy Idol. In 2009, the Pearl hosted a four-night concert residency by Mariah Carey known as Live at the Pearl.

The theater hosted the NHL Awards for three consecutive years, starting in 2009. The Pearl also hosted Ultimate Fighting Championship (UFC) cards each year, until UFC president Dana White had his credit line reduced at the Palms casino. White had been a frequent gambler there, and he pulled all future UFC events from the venue in 2012, after his falling-out with the casino.

The venue was closed in 2017, for a months-long renovation. It is operated by Live Nation. The Pearl was closed during the COVID-19 pandemic, and reopened on September 1, 2022.

On January 13, 2024, the venue hosted Hard To Kill which was the first Total Nonstop Action Wrestling pay-per-view under the TNA banner to take place since 2017.

From April 16, 2025 to April 19, 2025, the venue hosted Game Changer Wrestling's 2025 edition of their Collective series which also included Dragon Gate USA's The Rebirth, the WWE ID Championship Tournament, DEFY Wrestling's Living Proof, Josh Barnett's Bloodsport, PROGRESS Wrestling's Chapter 179: PROGRESS Las Vegas show, Joey Janela's Spring Break which featured the last match for Sabu, 4th Rope Wrestling's Heels Have Eyes: For The Culture, the WrestleCon Mark Hitchcock Memorial Supershow, and various shows from DDT Pro-Wrestling and Tokyo Joshi Pro-Wrestling.

=== Pool ===
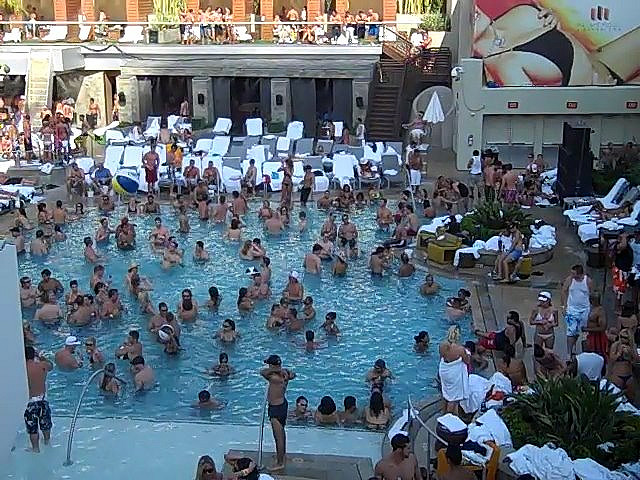
Palms pool area in 2009

At night, the Palms pool area was converted into a nightly club and lounge known as Skin, starting in 2002. A new $40 million pool area was opened in 2006, on two acres. The renovated pool area was enlarged from before, in order to accommodate guests in the new Fantasy Tower.

In 2007, the resort launched an annual pool party series known as Ditch Fridays. Each party attracted an average of 3,000 people. That year, the pool area also began hosting the Midsummer Night's Dream party by Playboy.

In 2011, the pool area hosted MTV Spring Break, which returned for the following year. In 2012, the pool area received a $600,000 renovation which included a bigger stage for entertainers and a new sound system. The resort also launched weekend pool parties known as Palms Pool Saturdays and Sunday Scene. The pool area was closed in 2017, to make way for Kaos, which featured several new pools. As of 2022, the resort includes a 73,000 sq ft (6,800 m^{2}) multi-level pool area.

== Union controversies ==
When the Palms opened, none of its employees belonged to a trade union. Many employees at nearby Strip resorts belonged to the Culinary Workers Union. A few weeks after the Palms opening, the Culinary union led a protest against the resort. The union alleged that Maloof paid his workers lower wages compared to unionized resorts, which he denied. Maloof believed that he would eventually prevail against the union, which alleged that he had threatened workers who supported unionization. In 2003, the National Labor Relations Board (NLRB) filed a 20-count complaint against the Palms, alleging that Maloof and resort managers made efforts to dissuade workers from unionizing. Later that year, a federal judge ordered the Palms to reinstate a cook, who was fired for union organizing attempts. The judge also determined that the resort was violating various labor laws by questioning employees about union activities, and warning or discharging those who took part in such activities.

In 2015, the Palms announced that it would outsource more than 200 food and beverage jobs to a third party operator, a decision that was criticized by the Culinary union. That year, the union made attempts to unionize the Palms, but it later said that such efforts were not being acknowledged by the resort. In 2016, hundreds of employees signed a petition seeking to retain their jobs amid Station and Red Rock's purchase of the property. The Culinary union had previously been involved in frequent feuds with Station. A union election was eventually held in 2018, with 614 employees taking part, out of approximately 900. The workers voted 84-percent in favor of unionization. However, Station challenged the results of the election and declined to negotiate with the union. The NLRB determined that Station had been "failing and refusing to bargain collectively and in good faith" with the union. In 2021, the union stated that the resort's impending sale would not affect ongoing worker negotiations. When the San Manuel Band purchased the casino, it agreed to use union resources in rehiring workers and tentatively participating in the union's health plans until an agreement was reached. A union contract was ratified on May 23, 2023, which covers non-gaming employees.

== Television and film history ==
The Palms increased its prominence after appearing in the reality television show The Real World: Las Vegas in 2002. The series took place throughout the Palms, including the hotel. Maloof had six rooms reconfigured into a 2,900 sq ft (270 m^{2}) suite for the cast, and other rooms on the same floor were occupied by the production crew. After production concluded, the suite was rented out for up to $10,000 a night. It became popular among celebrities.

Celebrity Poker Showdown was also filmed at the Palms from 2003 to 2005. Another reality television series, Party at the Palms, aired for 12 episodes during 2005. It was hosted by Jenny McCarthy, who would tour the resort and interview celebrities in each episode. The second season of High Stakes Poker was also shot at the resort. In addition, the Palms appeared in an episode of The O.C., and in The Real Housewives of Beverly Hills, starring Adrienne Maloof.

The Pearl Concert Theater, as well as other areas of the resort, hosted the 2007 MTV Video Music Awards. The resort also appeared in several music videos in 2009, including "Cause a Scene" by Teairra Marí and Flo Rida, "We Made You" by Eminem, and Katy Perry's "Waking Up in Vegas". The theater was also used during the Vegas Round for the fourth and fifth seasons of America's Got Talent.

In the 2000s, the resort's Brenden Theatres facility hosted several film festivals, including CineVegas. It also hosted film premieres such as Elektra (2005), Deuce Bigalow: European Gigolo (2005), Rocky Balboa (2006), Love in the Time of Cholera (2007), and Michael Jackson's This Is It (2009). The American Film Market, an event held annually in Los Angeles since its 1981 formation, moved to the Palms in 2024.

The 2024 film Anora was partly shot at the Palms, including a penthouse suite.

== See also ==
- List of integrated resorts
