= Fiesta Henderson =

Hotel and casino in Henderson, Las Vegas, Nevada

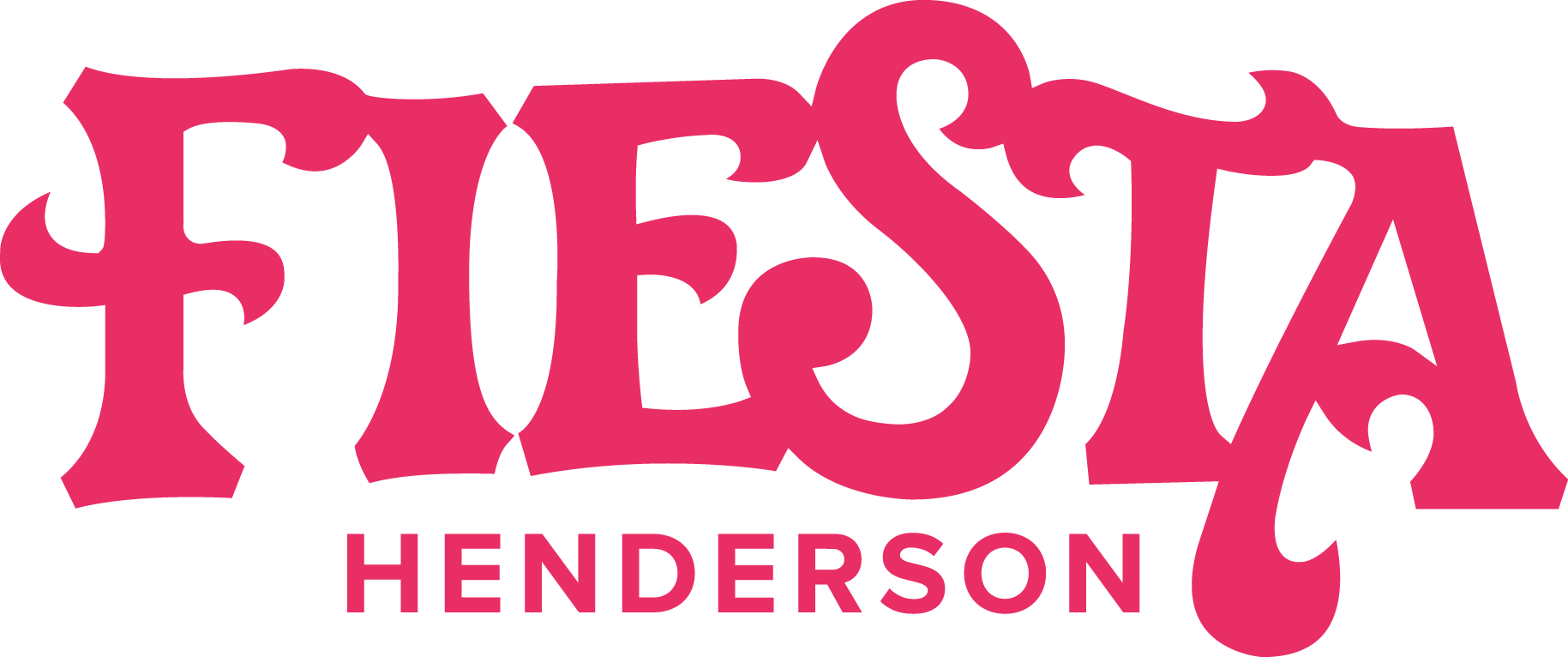

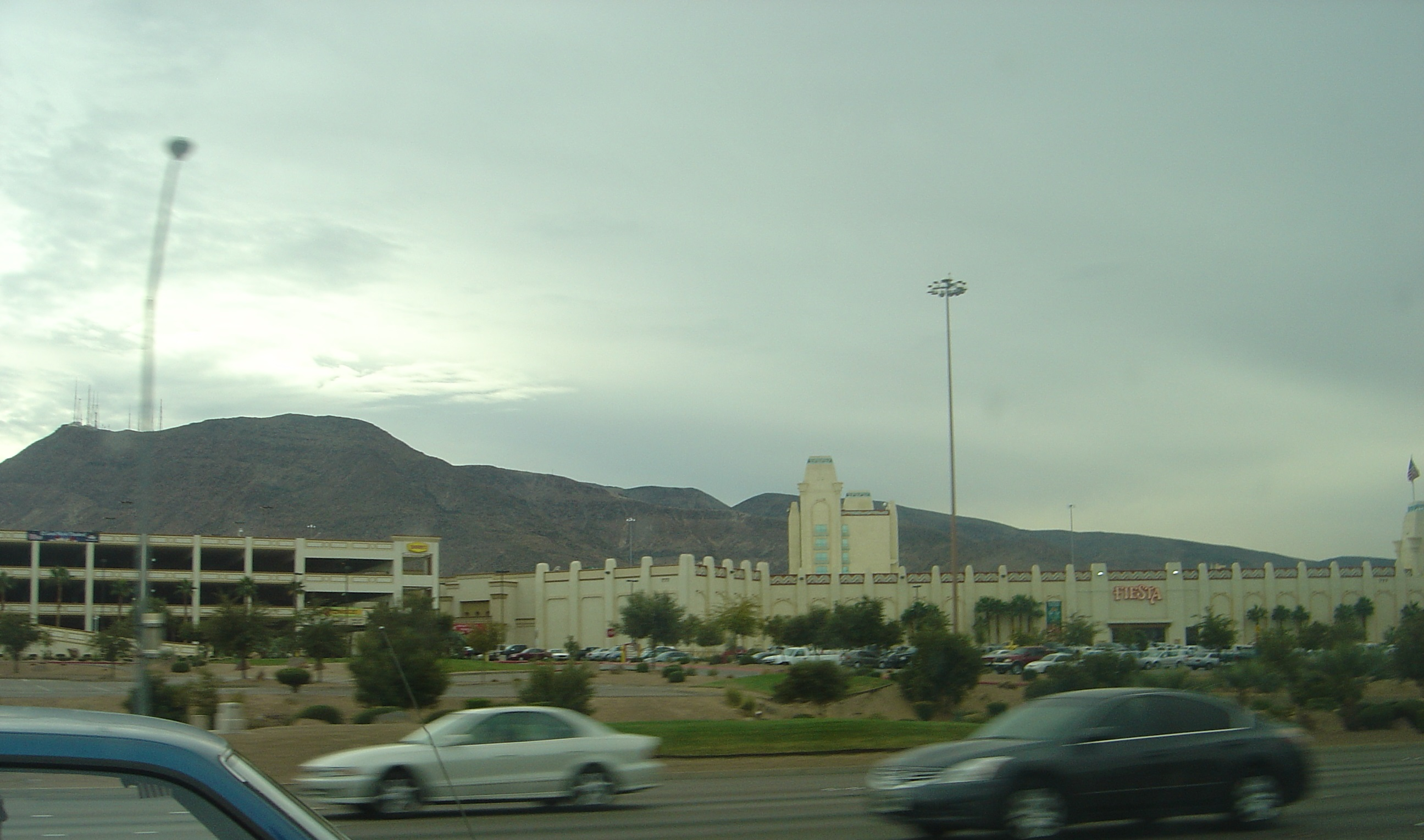
- Fiesta Henderson in 2010
- Interactive map of Fiesta Henderson
- Location: Henderson, Nevada, U.S.; 777 West Lake Mead Parkway; 36.032138°N 115.009379°W
- Opened: February 10, 1998; 28 years ago
- Closed: March 17, 2020; 6 years ago
- Theme: Southwestern party
- No. of rooms: 224
- Gaming space: 73,450 sq ft (6,824 m^{2})
- Signature attractions: Regal Cinemas
- Notable restaurants: Denny's; Festival Buffet; Fiesta Café; Coco Loco; Fuego Steakhouse
- Casino type: Land-based
- Owner: Station Casinos
- Previous names: The Reserve (1998–2001)
- Renovated in: 1999, 2001, 2006–2007, 2016, 2017

Fiesta Henderson (formerly The Reserve) was a hotel and casino located on 35 acres (14 ha) of land at 777 West Lake Mead Parkway in Henderson, Nevada. Gem Gaming announced the project in 1995, as The Reserve, with an opening planned for July 4, 1996. Construction began later in 1995, and the project was topped off in May 1996, with an opening scheduled for October 1. Steve Rebeil and Dominic Magliarditi, both of Gem Gaming, were the project developers. Later in 1996, Ameristar Casinos planned to purchase Gem Gaming, and construction slowed to allow for an expanded redesign of the project, which was then expected to open between March and April 1997.

In January 1997, Rebeil and Magliarditi were denied gaming licenses to operate the casino. Later that year, construction was stopped for three months when Ameristar accused Rebeil and Magliarditi of attempting to prevent Ameristar from issuing 7.5 million public stocks, which was to pay for the acquisition of Gem Gaming. Ameristar Casinos ultimately opened The Reserve on February 10, 1998, with an African safari/jungle theme, although the resort failed to generate a substantial profit. In 2001, The Reserve was purchased by Station Casinos, which renovated and rebranded the hotel-casino as the southwestern party-themed Fiesta Henderson. It was a sister property to Station's Fiesta Rancho, located in North Las Vegas, Nevada.

Nevada casinos were closed on March 17, 2020, due to the COVID-19 pandemic. Up to that point, the Fiestas were among Station's worst-performing properties. Although casinos were allowed to reopen later in 2020, the Fiesta closures would become permanent. Station announced in July 2022 that it would demolish the properties and sell the land.

== The Reserve (1998–2001) ==
The hotel-casino, originally known as The Reserve, was built in Henderson, Nevada, near Black Mountain, on Lake Mead Drive near U.S. Route 95.

=== Construction ===
The Reserve was announced by Gem Gaming in April 1995, with plans to break ground later that summer for an opening on July 4, 1996. The $60 million project would be the company's first hotel-casino, and would target motorists from Arizona and California. It was estimated that more than 80,000 cars passed by the project site each day, a number that was expected to increase to over 150,000 following the completion of a nearby beltway. Aside from the main resort, Gem Gaming planned for two additional phases of construction, to add other amenities such as a movie theater and more hotel rooms.

Construction was underway in November 1995, and the project's architectural plans were approved the following month by the Henderson Planning Commission. Steve Rebeil and Dominic Magliarditi of Gem Gaming were the project developers. In April 1996, Ameristar Casinos agreed to merge with Gem Gaming. Ameristar planned to open the property with 225 hotel rooms, 1,000 slot machines, and 35 gaming tables. After its planned opening, Ameristar intended to expand the casino to 50,000 sq ft (4,600 m^{2}) and increase the hotel by an additional 500 rooms, with plans to ultimately increase it to 1,500 rooms.

The project was topped off on May 17, 1996, and was approximately 45 percent finished, with an opening on track for October 1 of that year. Interior work was expected to begin in June 1996, following the completion of exterior work. By August 1996, construction had slowed to allow for the design of a second phase of the project. The decision to expand the project came as the result of the pending company merger. The redesign was also chosen to help the resort compete against Station Casinos' upcoming Sunset Station hotel-casino, also in Henderson. The first phase would include the casino, while the second phase would include additional casino space and an additional 350 hotel rooms, for a new total of 600. The project was expected to cost a total of $100 million. By October 1996, Ameristar chose to instead purchase Gem Gaming and become the sole owner of the project, while Rebeil and Magliarditi would operate the casino. An opening date between March and April 1997 was expected. Expansion plans received approval from the Henderson Planning Commission in February 1997.

In January 1997, Rebeil and Magliarditi were denied gaming licenses because of evidence that Rebeil's home development company was involved in a credit scam; as a result, they were not allowed to work for Ameristar. In March 1997, construction was delayed for more than three months, when Ameristar accused Rebeil and Magliarditi of attempting to prevent Ameristar from issuing 7.5 million public stocks, which was to pay for the acquisition of Gem Gaming Inc. In May 1997, Ameristar settled the dispute for $32.7 million. Construction resumed the following month. Work on the resort – including drywall, murals, and expansion plans – was nearing completion in November 1997, with an opening targeted for January. At the time, the resort was receiving approximately 600 employee applicants per day.

=== Design ===
The hotel-casino was designed by Henry Conversano, who also designed The Mirage resort on the Las Vegas Strip, and The Lost City at Sun City Resort Hotel and Casino in Sun City, South Africa. The hotel-casino's theme revolved around the concept of a fictional adventurer named Congo Jack, who had crash-landed his airplane in an African-themed environment, and was nursed back to health by Monsoon Mary. During The Reserve's operation, actors had been hired to portray the characters, also created by Conversano. A restaurant and a lounge were also named for them: Congo Jack Cafe and Monsoon Mary Lounge. The Reserve also included statues and murals of exotic animals in a jungle setting. The construction delay in 1997 allowed Conversano time to improve and redesign the resort, by adding a sound system which replicated the sound of rainstorms, birds, and lions throughout the high-ceilinged gaming and dining areas. Conversano also had time to integrate Congo rain forests into the resort's design. The resort's entrance was marked by 80-foot-high elephant tusks, and its parking lot was designed to resemble a Serengeti grassland.

=== Opening and operation ===
The resort opened with a fireworks show on the night of February 10, 1998, with a 10-story, 224-room hotel; a 37,000 sq ft (3,400 m^{2}) casino, with 26 table games and 1,435 slot machines; three lounges; four restaurants; and a 300-seat bingo hall. Henderson mayor James B. Gibson was among thousands of people who attended the resort's opening. The Reserve was valued at $125 million at the time. Upon opening, The Reserve's targeted clientele was local residents in Henderson, which was the fastest-growing city in the United States at that time. The resort opened with the first phase completed, and Ameristar owned a vacant area of 28 acres surrounding the resort, with the option to purchase an additional 20 acres for future expansions. Ameristar chose to wait until the resort gained a customer base before proceeding with any expansions.

By March 1999, The Reserve had lost a substantial amount of money. To improve the resort's earnings, Ameristar initiated a plan that included promotions, direct mail marketing, cash-back programs, improved operating efficiencies, and reductions in labor costs. The following month, Ameristar reported that the resort had generated profit for the first time during February and March 1999. Anthony Curtis of the Las Vegas Advisor opined that while The Reserve had good bargain deals, it suffered from a bad location and a "strange theme," saying, "The jungle theme was always dark and brooding, and I think that turned people off a bit." The Reserve also faced competition from the Sunset Station. Remodeling and expansion work was underway in May 1999.

In October 2000, Ameristar agreed to purchase two Missouri casinos owned by Station Casinos, which would then purchase The Reserve in exchange. Station Casinos also planned to purchase the Fiesta hotel and casino in North Las Vegas, Nevada, and considered redesigning The Reserve and renaming it as another Fiesta location. Ameristar sold The Reserve for $71.8 million to Station Casinos, which took over ownership on January 30, 2001. The resort was temporarily closed that day to allow for the ownership change to take place. At the time, The Reserve had a 41,500 sq ft (3,860 m^{2}) casino. Station Casinos also purchased the Fiesta that month.

== Fiesta Henderson (2001–2020) ==
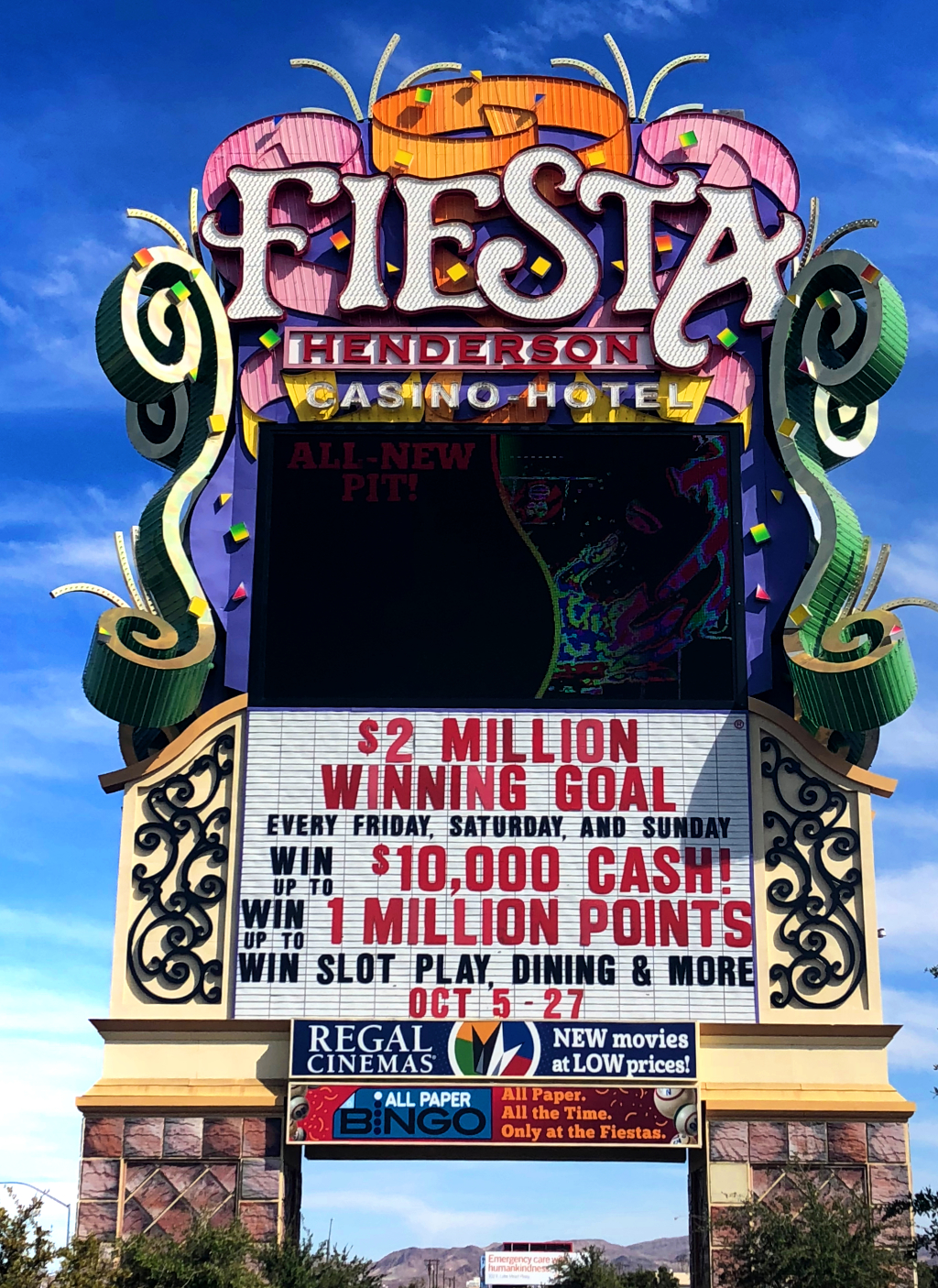
Fiesta Henderson sign in 2018

On April 23, 2001, Station Casinos announced that The Reserve would be renamed as Fiesta Henderson, as the company had hoped to turn Fiesta into a successful brand name. Station Casinos' chief financial officer said that some day, there would "almost certainly" be more than two Fiesta casinos in the Las Vegas Valley.

During 2001, Station Casinos spent $12 million on a five-month renovation of the resort, which included replacing its jungle theme with a southwestern party theme. The resort's jungle-themed decor was donated and auctioned. The Fiesta Henderson celebrated its official grand opening with a fireworks show on December 29, 2001.

In April 2005, Station Casinos announced a $70 million expansion of the resort, which would include expansion of the race and sportsbook, and the addition of a 12-screen movie theater, a 1,500-space parking garage, and 350 slot machines. The expansion was expected to begin in July 2005, and be completed by June 2006. The parking garage was opened in August 2006. Other renovations were underway as of October 2006, and were completed in 2007. The 12-screen movie theater, operated by Regal Cinemas, opened in October 2007. It was Regal Cinemas' first all-digital movie theater.

From 2009 to 2011, Fiesta Rancho and Fiesta Henderson were voted "Best Video Poker" by readers of the Las Vegas Review-Journal. The Fiesta casinos were also chosen by the Las Vegas Review-Journal for its 2011 "Best Bingo" award. As of 2016, the hotel-casino was the eighth biggest employer in Henderson, with 600 to 700 workers.

A remodeling of the hotel rooms was completed in April 2016, and the resort exterior was also updated, including a new paint color. A renovation of the sportsbook, including new seating and LED television screens, was completed in July 2017. As of 2017, the casino was 73,450 sq ft (6,824 m^{2}).

In September 2019, approximately 300 employees voted 57 percent in favor to unionize the property. The employees would be represented by the Culinary Workers Union.

=== Closure and demolition ===
Nevada casinos were among businesses required to close on March 17, 2020, due to the COVID-19 pandemic and its effects on the state. Although Nevada casinos were allowed to reopen on June 4, 2020, Station Casinos planned to keep the Fiesta Henderson closed for a year due to economic uncertainty brought on by the pandemic.

The Fiestas were among Station's worst-performing properties prior to the pandemic. When casinos reopened, the customer base at Fiesta Henderson relocated to Station's other nearby properties, Sunset Station and Green Valley Ranch. The company announced in August 2020 that the reopening of closed properties, including the Fiestas, was dependent on demand, noting that the closures may be permanent. During its closure, Fiesta Henderson was sometimes used as a COVID-19 testing site.

Station announced on July 15, 2022 that it would demolish the Fiesta properties and sell the land. Analysts viewed the demolition plans as a defensive move to prevent future competition from gaming rivals. Demolition began on September 12, 2022. Three months later, the city of Henderson announced that it would purchase the site for $32 million to build an indoor recreational sports center. At the city's request, the Fiesta Henderson's parking garage was left on the property to be incorporated into the new project. Parts of the land will be sold for restaurant and retail space. The sale included a stipulation from Station Casinos that the property not be used to build another gaming facility.
