= Kerry Simon =

American celebrity chef (1955–2015)

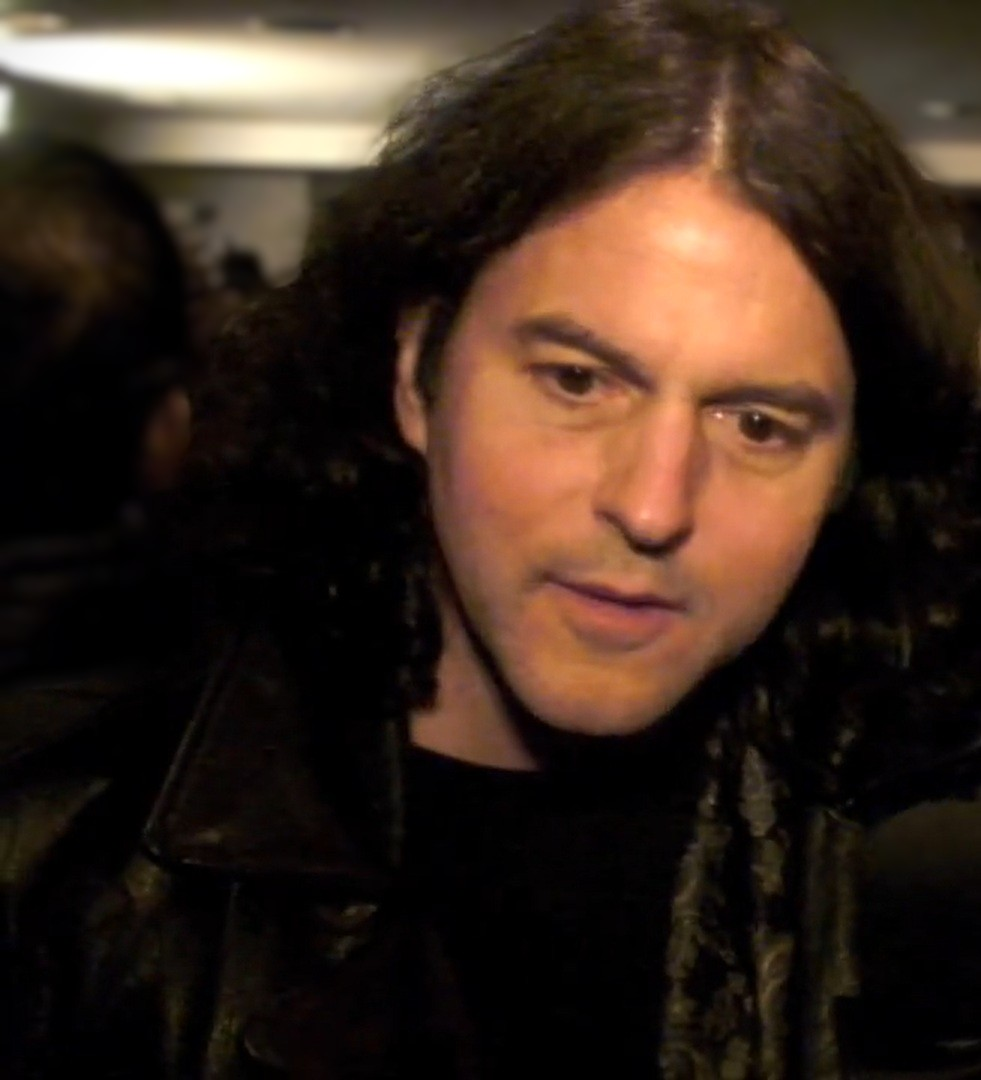
- Simon in 2009
- Born: June 17, 1955; Philadelphia, U.S.
- Died: September 11, 2015 (aged 60); Las Vegas, U.S.
- Culinary career
- Television show: Iron Chef America

Kerry Glen Simon (June 17, 1955 – September 11, 2015) was an American celebrity chef and restaurateur based in Las Vegas. Simon was also known by the moniker "Rock n' Roll Chef", given to him by Rolling Stone. He was the executive chef and proprietor at his namesake restaurant "Simon" at Palms Place in Las Vegas. His other restaurants included Simon LA, in Los Angeles, Simon Prime in Atlantic City, New Jersey, along with KGB and Carson Kitchen in Las Vegas. He has made several television appearances, including on Iron Chef America, Hell's Kitchen, Iron Chef USA.

== Biography ==
Simon was born in Philadelphia and grew up in Evanston, Illinois, a suburb of Chicago's North Shore region. He initially had plans to become a musician, but eventually developed a passion for cooking. Simon attended school at The Culinary Institute of America in Hyde Park, New York. While in school, Simon was in an apprenticeship with Jean Morel.

Upon graduation, Simon worked at restaurants such as La Côte Basque and Lutece before becoming the personal chef for notable persons such as John Addey and Saul Steinberg. In 1989, Simon was hired by Ivana Trump to be the executive chef in the Plaza Hotel's Edwardian Room and in 1991, Rolling Stone named him one of the top personalities of the year.

In 2001, Simon was approached by Elizabeth Blau and Peter Morton about partnering in a restaurant bearing his name and showcasing his cuisine, resulting in the October 2002 opening of Simon Kitchen & Bar at the Hard Rock Hotel and Casino. The restaurant was selected as one of "America's Best New Restaurants" by Esquire.

Simon partnered with several people to open many restaurants, such as the Blue Star, Starfish, Max's, and Mercury. He has also been a partner at Mercer Kitchen in Manhattan and executive chef/partner at Prime in Las Vegas.

In June 2013, Simon opened the Simon Mansion & Supper Club, located in the Hard Rock Hotel & Casino in Punta Cana, Dominican Republic.

Simon was diagnosed in 2013 with multiple-system atrophy (MSA), a degenerative neurological disorder. He died on September 11, 2015, in Las Vegas while under hospice care.

== Television appearances ==
In 2001, Simon challenged and lost to Iron Chef American Todd English (in Battle Dungeness Crab, a.k.a. Las Vegas Showdown) in one of only two produced episodes of Iron Chef USA.

In the second episode of the 2005 season, Simon appeared on Iron Chef America, challenging and defeating Cat Cora in Battle Hamburger. He was a judge for Iron Chef America. Aside from Iron Chef America, he also made appearances on Hell's Kitchen (Season 8) and can also be seen on an episode of the Fine Living Network's What Makes it Tick.
