= Jon Jerde =

American architect (1940–2015)

Jon Jerde FAIA
- Born: Jon Adams Jerde; January 22, 1940; Alton, Illinois, US
- Died: February 9, 2015 (aged 75); Los Angeles, California, US
- Occupation: Architect
- Spouse: Janice Ambry Jerde
- Children: 5
- Website: jerde.com

Jon Adams Jerde, FAIA (January 22, 1940 – February 9, 2015) was an American architect based in Venice, Los Angeles, California, founder and chairman of The Jerde Partnership, a design architecture and urban planning firm specializing in the design of shopping malls that has created a number of commercial developments around the globe. Jerde became well known as an innovator in the design of malls and related spaces. His firm has grown into a multi-disciplinary firm with offices in Los Angeles, Orange County, California, Hong Kong, and Shanghai.

== Early life ==
Born in Alton, Illinois, he moved often from oil field to oil field, mostly in the West, with his father, Paul, who was a peripatetic engineer for oil companies, and his mother, formerly Marion Adams. When his parents split up, Jerde lived with his mother in the Long Beach, CA area.

Of his youth, Jerde told The Los Angeles Times, “My mother was an alcoholic. My father was usually away working. As a lonely kid, I collected trash items and built them into backyard constructions.”

== Career ==
Jerde was a graduate of the School of Architecture at the University of Southern California.

=== Horton Plaza ===
After early years working at Charles Kober Associates on multiple retail projects, including Plaza Pasadena, Jerde was commissioned by developer Ernie Hahn to design the Horton Plaza shopping center in downtown San Diego. The project was a five-story outdoor retail complex, with the main passage being diagonally oriented to the street grid and at the time anchored by Nordstrom, The Broadway, and J. W. Robinson's department stores; and connected to a Westin Hotel and the Balboa Theatre, resulting in an urban mixed-use center. It featured long one-way ramps and sudden drop-offs, parapets, shadowy colonnades and cul-de-sacs. Its design broke many traditional mall-design rules such as lowering ambient arousal levels and protecting the maximal lines-of-sight to merchandise. Its fragmented spaces were finished in a variety of bright colors. The project was completed in 1985.

Jerde's Horton Plaza brought 25 million visitors in its first year, and as of 2004 continued to generate San Diego's highest sales per unit area. Jerde claimed that the project also sparked nearly $2.4 billion in redevelopment to the surrounding area and downtown core. Later the mall would lose business to centers in nearby Mission Valley as they renovated and to big box retailers, from a limited ability to capitalize on the resurgence of foot traffic on the adjacent Gaslamp District streets due to its physically being cut off behind parking garages, and from the 2010s retail apocalypse, so that by 2019 it was set to close and be converted to a workplace for the tech industry.

=== Other work ===
The Jerde Partnership was involved in the design and planning of the Los Angeles 1984 Olympics. Based on the success of both Horton and the Olympics, the firm designed Fashion Island in Newport Beach, CA in 1989, the Mall of America in Bloomington, Minnesota in 1992, the Urban Entertainment Center Universal CityWalk in Los Angeles, the pirate show and facade of the Treasure Island Casino in Vegas in 1993, the Las Vegas Fremont Street Experience in 1995 and the Bellagio in Las Vegas in 1998.

=== The Jerde Partnership ===
The firm has developed into a major international company with key urban regeneration projects overseas, including Beursplein in Rotterdam, Netherlands, and Canal City Hakata in Fukuoka, Japan, both in 1996, as well as other projects in Japan, China and Europe. Jerde is also responsible for a string of landmark urban mixed-use developments, including: Namba Parks in Osaka, Japan, awarded the Urban Land Institute Awards of Excellence: Asia Pacific, 2009; Roppongi Hills in Tokyo, Japan; Kanyon in Istanbul, Turkey and Zlote Tarasy in Warsaw, Poland. More recently the firm has designed: The Vermont, a multifamily development in Los Angeles's Koreatown, the Grand Hyatt Sanya Haitang Bay Resort and Spa in Hainan, China; Puerto Cancun Marina Town Center in Cancun, Mexico; and Pacific City in Huntington Beach, California.

== Completed ==
| Name | City | US State/ Country | Completed | Other Information | Image |
|---|---|---|---|---|---|
| Horton Plaza | San Diego | California | 1985 | | |
| Seventh Market Place now FIGat7th | Downtown Los Angeles | California | 1986 | | |
| Fashion Island | Newport Beach | California | 1989 | Major redesign of original 1967 mall | |
| Mall of America | Twin Cities | Minnesota | 1992 | | |
| Universal CityWalk Hollywood | Los Angeles | California | 1993 | | |
| Treasure Island Hotel and Casino | Las Vegas Strip | Nevada | 1993 | First collaboration with Steve Wynn | |
| Fremont Street Experience | Las Vegas | Nevada | 1995 | | |
| Canal City Hakata | Fukuoka | Japan | 1996 | | |
| Bellagio | Las Vegas Strip | Nevada | 1998 | | |
| Palms Casino Resort | Las Vegas | Nevada | 2001 | First tower (right in image) | |
| Dentsu Building | Tokyo | Japan | 2002 | | |
| Roppongi Hills | Tokyo | Japan | 2002 | | |
| Wynn Las Vegas | Las Vegas Strip | Nevada | 2005 | | |
| Palms Phase II | Las Vegas | Nevada | 2006 | "Fantasy Tower" (left in image) | |
| Namba Parks | Osaka | Japan | 2007 | | |
| Palms Place | Las Vegas | Nevada | 2008 | Third tower | |
| Santa Monica Place | Santa Monica | California | 2010 | Complete overhaul of Frank Gehry's 1980 indoor mall, turning it into an outdoor mall. Final completed work. | |

== Honors ==
Jerde was named the first recipient of the USC School of Architecture's Distinguished Alumnus award, in 1985, and became a fellow of the American Institute of Architects in 1990.

== Death ==
Jerde died on February 9, 2015, at his home in the Brentwood neighborhood of Los Angeles; he had been suffering from cancer and Alzheimer's disease. He was 75.
