= Garduño's =

New Mexican restaurant chain

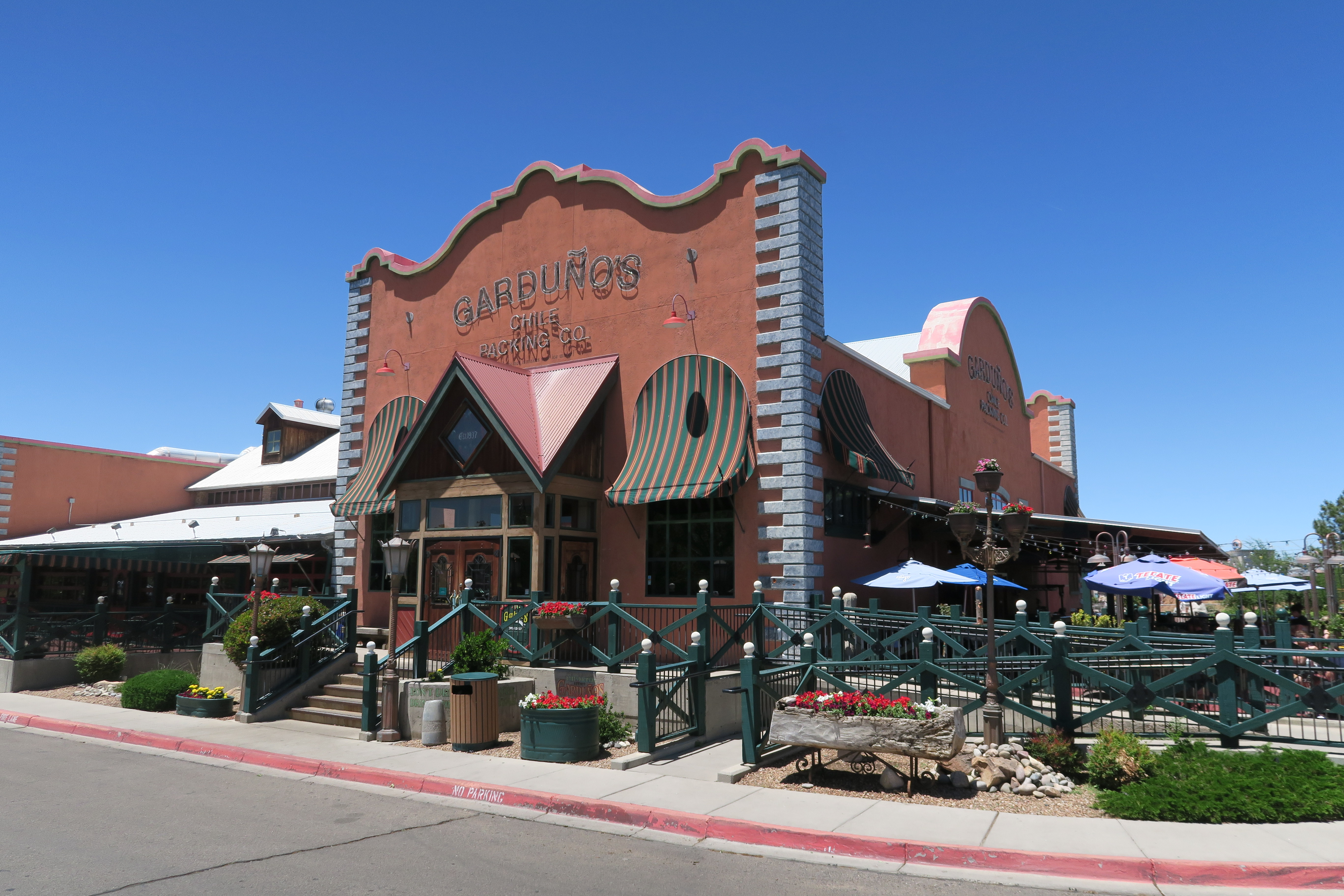
- Garduño's
- Type: Privately held
- Industry: Casual dining
- Founded: Albuquerque, New Mexico, 1969
- Headquarters: Albuquerque, New Mexico, United States
- Number of locations: 2
- Area served: New Mexico
- Products: Mexican and New Mexican cuisine
- Website: www.gardunosrestaurants.com

Garduño's is a Mexican and New Mexican cuisine restaurant chain from the city of Albuquerque, New Mexico. There are two locations in Albuquerque, and former locations in Las Cruces, Santa Fe, Phoenix area and the Las Vegas Valley.

== History ==
The restaurant was started as a small family-owned restaurant in 1969. Since then, it has expanded into a chain of restaurants. The chain ran into financial trouble in 2011, filing for Chapter 7 bankruptcy, then was purchased by Southwest Brands. Afterward several of the locations closed, including the Las Vegas Valley location. Garduño's has opened new locations in the Albuquerque area.

== Specialties ==
Garduño's is known for featuring large plates of Mexican and New Mexican foods, as well as large margaritas and various alcohols.

== Reception ==
They have received accolades in both their home state of New Mexico, and their Las Vegas Valley locations. The Palms Casino Resort and Fiesta Rancho locations were voted Las Vegas Review-Journal's "Best Mexican Restaurant" consecutively for nearly 20 years.

== In popular culture ==
A Garduño's restaurant located at the Winrock Town Center was featured in the Breaking Bad episode "Confessions". After the episode aired on August 25, 2013, Garduño's reported a surge of visitors to the restaurant.
