= Palms Place =

Condo hotel in Paradise, Nevada

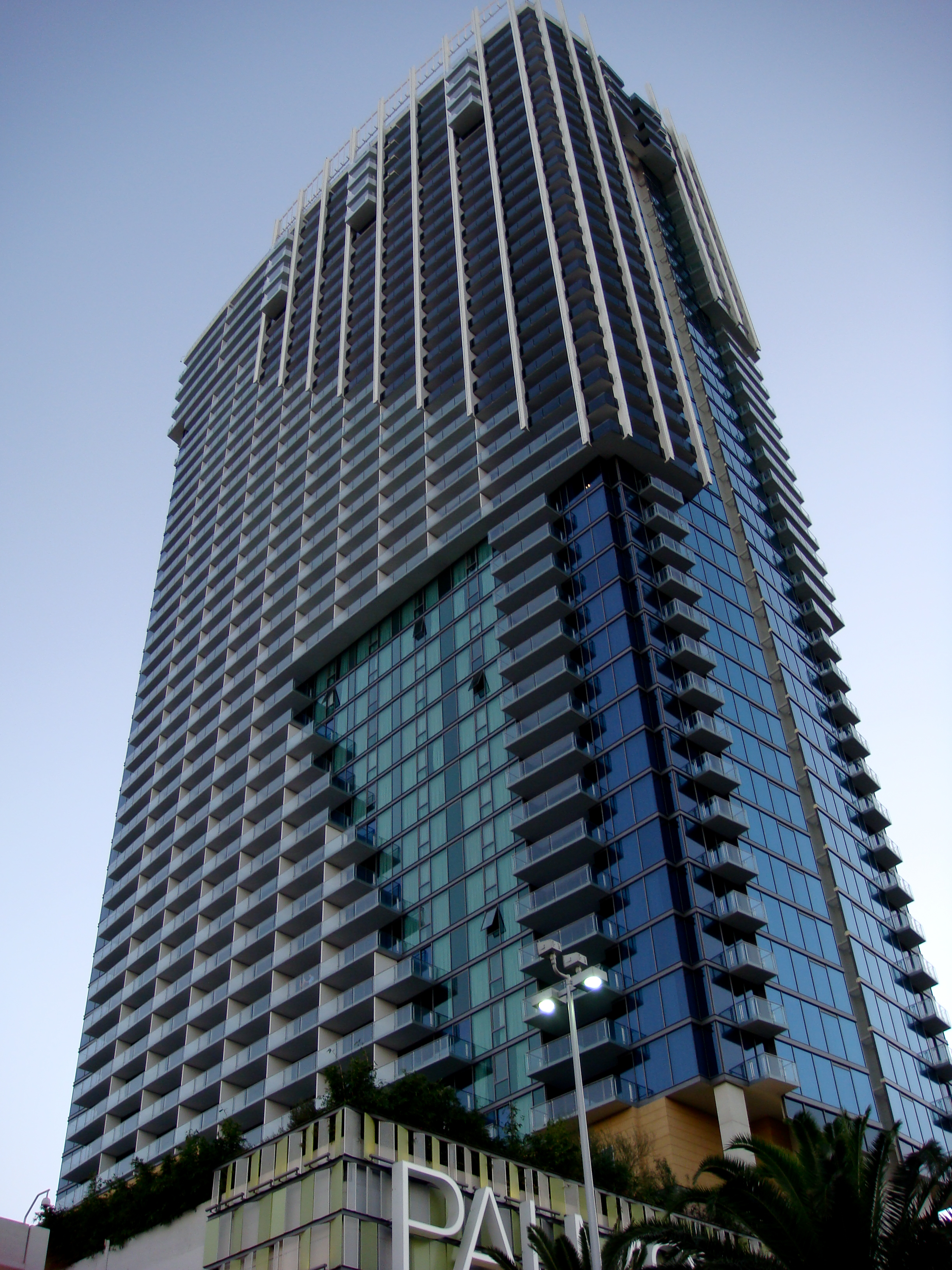
- Palms Place in 2008
- Interactive map of the Palms Place area

General information
- Type: Condo hotel
- Location: 4381 West Flamingo Road, Paradise, Nevada, United States
- Coordinates: 36.114262°N 115.198769°W
- Groundbreaking: May 5, 2006
- Topped-out: August 10, 2007
- Opened: 2008

Technical details
- Floor count: 47

Design and construction
- Architecture firm: Jerde Partnership
- Developer: George Maloof
- Main contractor: M.J. Dean

Other information
- Number of units: 599

Palms Place is a 47-story condo hotel in Paradise, Nevada, near the Las Vegas Strip. It is connected to the Palms Casino Resort. The project was announced in March 2005, to capitalize on a condominium boom occurring in Las Vegas at the time. Groundbreaking took place in May 2006, and the tower was topped off in August 2007. Palms Place opened in 2008, during the Great Recession, and some buyers had difficulty completing their unit purchases because of poor economic conditions.

== History ==
Palms Place was announced by George Maloof on March 2, 2005, as part of a $600 million expansion of the Palms resort, which was opened by the Maloof family in 2001. The Palms Place tower would include 599 condo hotel units. The project was meant to capitalize on a condominium boom occurring in Las Vegas at the time. Construction of the tower was scheduled to begin in 2006. Additional hotel rooms were originally planned for the property until 2004, when condo-hotel units were chosen instead because of the demand for residential units. The Los Angeles-based Jerde Partnership was the designer for Palms Place.

Units in the tower had already generated buyer interest prior to the project's official announcement, at which point more than 50 percent of the units had been reserved. The Palms' existing customer base included actors, musicians, and sports figures who were interested in purchasing units in the tower. Most of the remaining units were sold within a couple months. The project was initially expected to cost $300 million, although rising construction costs brought the budget to $350 million. Sales prices were increased six times over the next year to keep up with the rising construction costs. The project was financed by Wells Fargo, and M.J. Dean was the general contractor. A groundbreaking ceremony took place on May 5, 2006, and the tower was topped off on August 10, 2007.

A certificate of occupancy was issued in February 2008, and the first residents were expected to begin moving in at the end of the month. The tower's penthouses were still under construction and were expected to be finished by May 2008. Individual owners had the option of renting out their units as hotel rooms, for a 50 percent profit. A grand opening event was held on May 31, 2008, and was attended by various celebrities, as well as George Maloof. The property opened during the Great Recession. Maloof said, "Sometimes you can't help when you open. You just have to work hard and live through it."

As of October 2008, sales had only been finalized for 342 units, or 57 percent of the 599 units. Because of poor economic conditions, buyers had difficulty obtaining the necessary credit to finalize their purchases. In May 2009, the Palms began offering financial assistance to approximately 150 buyers who had already made down payments but were unable to get full financing to close on their purchases. At the time, 370 unit sales had been finalized.

Notable residents have included Jessica Simpson, Eminem, Paul Stanley, Hulk Hogan, and Floyd Mayweather Jr. Phillip Maloof owned a Palms Place penthouse, which he put up for sale in 2014, at a cost of $38 million. The purchase would include artwork by Pablo Picasso and Salvador Dalí. After months without a buyer, Maloof decided to include a Lamborghini Huracán as part of the purchase. The Muleseum, a 1,300 sq ft (120 m^{2}) suite dedicated to the Moscow mule cocktail, was debuted in March 2018. The suite included a bar with several variations of the drink available.

Maloof put his penthouse on the market again in 2019, with a $15 million listing price. Turnkey Pads, a vacation property company, purchased the penthouse later that year for $12.5 million, making it the most expensive high-rise condo sale in Las Vegas history. Turnkey spent $1 million to renovate the penthouse and add a helipad. The company began renting the penthouse out in December 2019, with prices ranging from $5,000 to $25,000 a night. Turnkey also owned and managed approximately 100 other units at Palms Place.

== Features ==
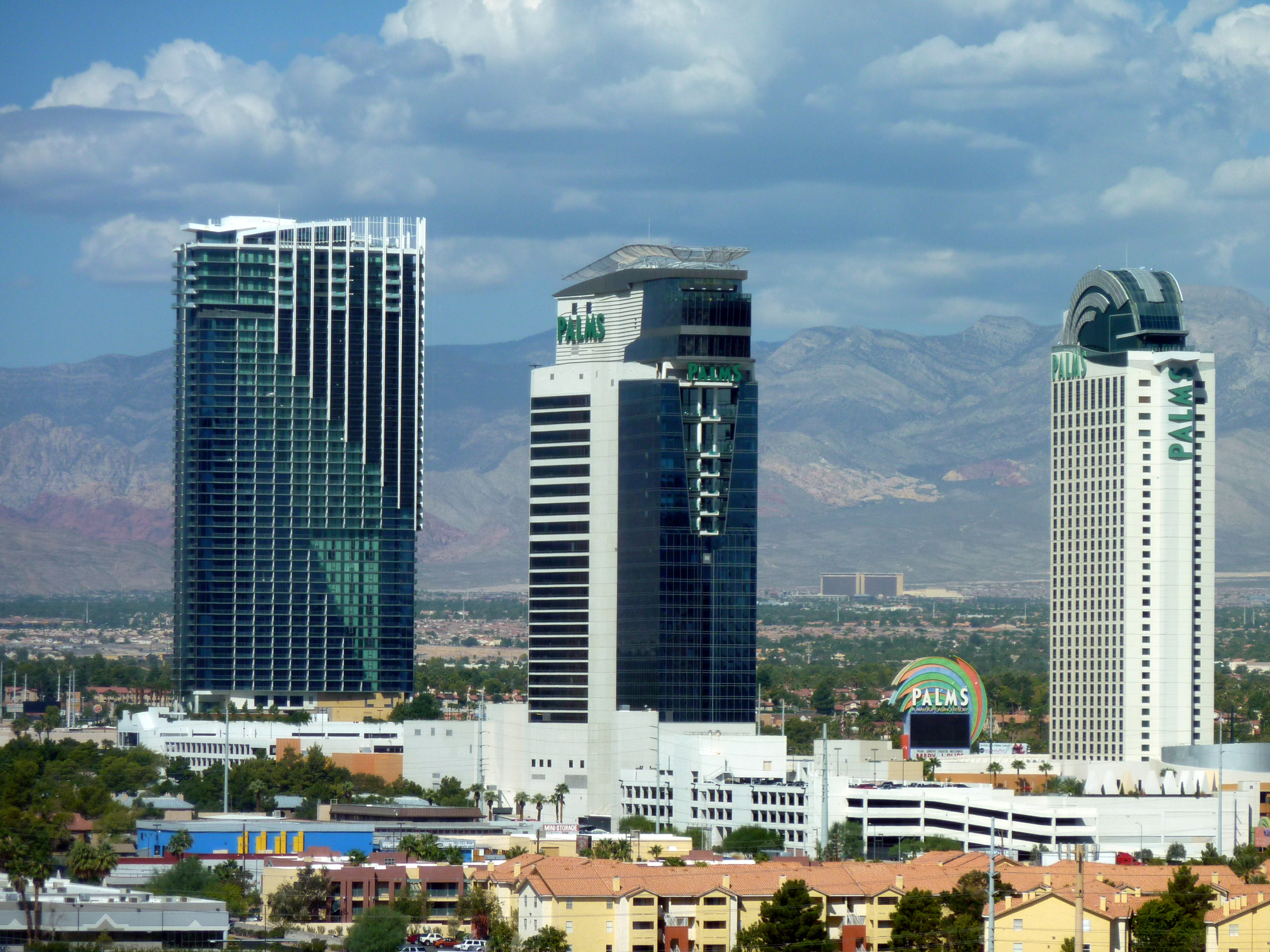
Palms Place (left) alongside the Palms' two hotel towers, 2012

Palms Place consists of a 47-story condo hotel tower, located on the western end of the Palms resort property. Palms Place is connected to the main Palms resort through a moving walkway known as the SkyTube. Residential units include 600 sq ft (56 m^{2}) studios, 1,200 sq ft (110 m^{2}) suites with one bedroom, and penthouses ranging 2,000 to 7,000 sq ft (190 to 650 m^{2}). The tower contains 21 penthouses, occupying the top four floors.

Amenities include concierge service, 24-hour room service, and a business center. The property also features a 50,000 sq ft (4,600 m^{2}) pool and spa, known as Drift Spa. The spa spans two floors and includes a fitness center, the first Turkish bath in Las Vegas, the Palms Place Salon, and a tanning salon named Sunset Tan. A bar, Rojo Lounge, operates in the lobby.

A restaurant, Simon Restaurant and Lounge, opened in May 2008. It was operated by chef Kerry Simon. The restaurant was located in a 6,000 sq ft (560 m^{2}) space on the sixth floor, next to the pool area, offering a view of it via floor-to-ceiling windows. The restaurant's design consisted of Earth elements such as fire, stone, water and wood, as well as an herb wall of living plants. The eatery's target clientele was young and hip people. The restaurant included a sushi bar, and eventually became popular for its Sunday brunch. Servers would wear pajamas during brunch, and customers had the option to do so as well. The restaurant became a popular dining spot for celebrities. Scenes would later be shot at the restaurant for The Real Housewives of Beverly Hills and La La's Full Court Life.

In July 2008, Palms Place introduced a weekly, evening pool party event that would start off with cocktails in the Simon restaurant before moving to the pool deck for DJ music and swimming. During the first month, the pool parties featured $7,000 worth of rubber ducks. The 25,000 ducks came in a variety of colors and designs. The Duck Party returned in 2012, with more than 25,000 rubber ducks.

In February 2015, it was announced that Simon would close in three months when its lease was scheduled to expire. At the time, chef Simon was battling multiple system atrophy, and he celebrated his birthday at the restaurant shortly before its closure. The Simon restaurant was replaced by Cafe 6, which opened in May 2015. Café 6, named after its location on the sixth floor, featured a new menu focused on burgers. In 2018, Cafe 6 was replaced by Laguna Pool House & Kitchen.

== See also ==
- List of integrated resorts
