= List of Empire ships (O) =

== Suffix beginning with O ==
=== Empire Oak ===
Empire Oak was a 487 GRT tug that was built by Goole Shipbuilding & Repairing Co. Ltd., Goole. Launched on 15 March 1941 and completed in July 1941. Torpedoed on 22 August 1941 and sunk by U-564 at 40°41′N 11°39′W while a member of Convoy OG 71.

=== Empire Oberon ===
Empire Oberon was a 244 GRT tug that was built by Henry Scarr Ltd., Hessle. Launched on 24 November 1942 and completed in January 1943. Sank on 7 September 1959 near Akra, Calcutta when barge alongside sank. Total loss, wreck blown up to clear shipping lane in October 1959.

=== Empire Ocean ===
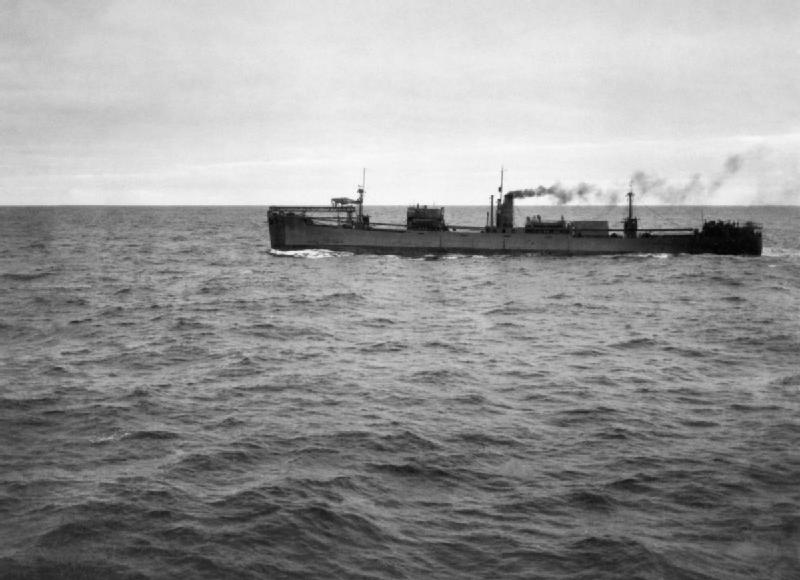
Empire Ocean

Empire Ocean was a 6,765 GRT cargo ship that was built in 1941 by William Gray & Co Ltd, West Hartlepool. She ran aground near Shingle Head, Newfoundland on 4 August 1942. Refloated the next day and taken in tow but sank at 47°01′N 52°50′W).

=== Empire Ocelot ===
Empire Ocelot was a 5,866 GRT cargo ship that was built by the Ames Shipbuilding and Drydock Company, Seattle, Washington. She was launched in 1919 as West Jena for the USSB. She was sold in 1925 to Forest Transportation Corporation, Seattle and was renamed Myrtle. Sold in 1930 to the Pacific-Atlantic Steamship Corporation, Portland, Oregon and renamed San Marcos. To MoWT in 1940 and renamed Empire Ocelot. Torpedoed and sunk on 28 September 1940 by U-32 in the Atlantic Ocean.

=== Empire Ock ===
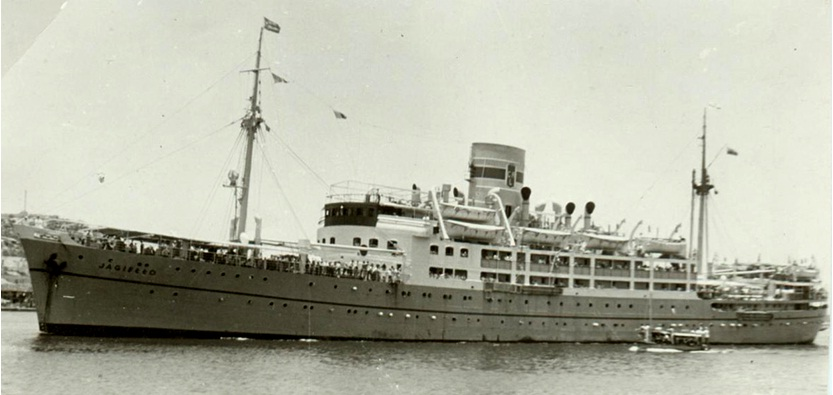
Jagiełło, formerly Empire Ock

Empire Ock was a 6,133 GRT passenger ship that was built by Blohm & Voss, Hamburg. Completed in 1939 as Dogu. To Deutsche Afrika Line in 1940 and renamed Luderitzbucht. Used as an accommodation ship during the Second World War. Renamed Duala in 1945, seized as a war prize in May 1945 at Flensburg. To MoWT and renamed Empire Ock. Allocated to USSR in 1946 and renamed Peotr Weliky. Sold in 1948 to Gdynia America Line, Poland and renamed Jagiello. To USSR in 1949 and renamed Petr Velikiy. Scrapped in 1974 at Castelló de la Plana, Spain.

=== Empire Oil (I) ===
Empire Oil was an 8,145 GRT tanker that was built by Blythwood Shipbuilding, Scotstoun. Launched on 23 July 1940, transferred to the Royal Fleet Auxiliary in November 1940 and renamed RFA Darkdale. Torpedoed and sunk off Saint Helena by U-68 on 22 October 1941.

=== Empire Oil (II) ===
Empire Oil was an 8,031 GRT tanker that was built by Furness Shipbuilding Co Ltd, Haverton Hill-on-Tees. Launched on 11 February 1941 and completed in May 1941. Torpedoed on 10 September 1942 and crippled by U-659 and finished off by U-584 at 51°23′N 28°13′W while a member of Convoy ON 127.

=== Empire Onyx ===
Empire Onyx was an 8,221 GRT tanker that was built by Harland and Wolff Ltd, Govan. Launched on 21 August 1941 and completed in December 1941. Allocated in 1942 to the Norwegian Government and renamed Nortind. Torpedoed on 20 June 1942 and damaged by U-67 at 28°41′N 89°34′W, put into New Orleans thence to Mobile, Alabama for repairs. Torpedoed on 16 January 1943 and sunk by U-358 at 58°40′N 33°10′W while a member of Convoy HX 223.

=== Empire Opal ===
Empire Opal was a 9,811 GRT tanker that was built by Sir J Laing & Sons Ltd, Sunderland. Launched on 28 April 1941 and completed in July 1941. Sold in 1945 to The South Georgia Co. Ltd., converted to a whaling tanker, now 12,874 GRT (14,560 DWT) and renamed Southern Opal. Operated under the management of Christian Salvesen Ltd, Leith. Laid up on 15 May 1961 at Tønsberg, Norway and scrapped in August 1964 in Hamburg.

=== Empire Opossum ===
Empire Opossum was a 5,760 GRT cargo ship that was built by Northwest Steel Company, Portland, Oregon. Laid down as Joffre for Compagnie Générale Transatlantique, France but completed in June 1918 as Western Ocean for the United States Shipping Board (USSB). To MoWT in 1941 and renamed Empire Opossom. Sold in 1949 to Clunies Shipping Co, Glasgow and renamed Marianne Clunies. Sold in 1950 to D Oltmann & Co, Bremen, fitted with a diesel engine and renamed Ansgaritor. Scrapped in March 1959 at Krimpen aan den IJssel, Netherlands.

=== Empire Oriole ===
Empire Oriole was a 6,551 GRT Type C2-S-A1 ship that was built by Bath Iron Works, Bath, Maine. Completed in October 1941 as Extavia for American Export Lines Inc as one of four variants of the C2-S-A1 type intended for the Spanish, North African and Black Sea trade built slightly shorter than the basic design, 420 ft (128.0 m), in order to navigate rivers to inland ports. To MoWT in 1941 and renamed Empire Oriole. To United States Maritime Commission (USMC) in 1942 and renamed Extavia. Converted to a transport ship by Todd Shipyards, Brooklyn, New York, completed in November 1943. To American Export Lines in February 1946. Scrapped in July 1968 in Alicante, Spain.

=== Empire Orkney ===
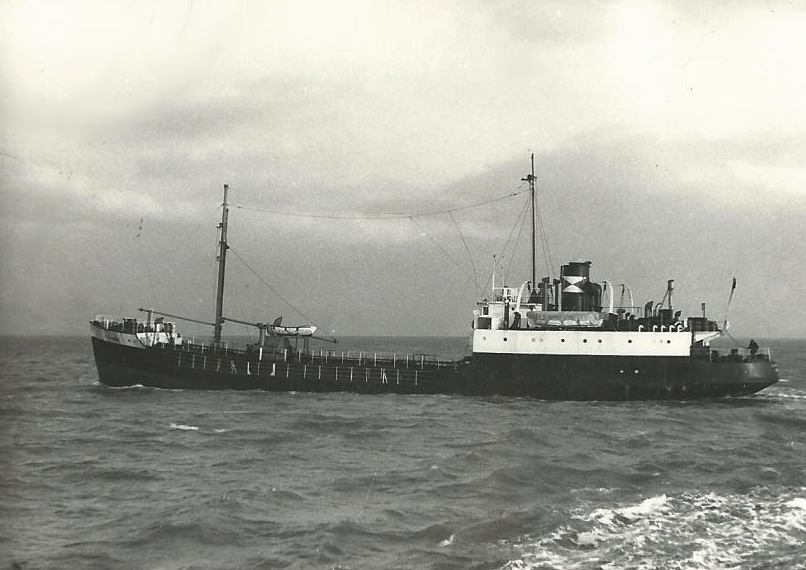
Alchymist, formerly Empire Orkney

Empire Orkney was an 813 GRT coastal tanker that was built by A & J Inglis Ltd, Glasgow. Launched on 30 November 1944 and completed in 1945. Sold in 1950 to F T Everard & Sons Ltd. and renamed Alchymist. Arrived on 3 May 1969 at Bruges, Belgium for scrapping.

=== Empire Ortolan ===
Empire Ortolan was a 4,989 GRT cargo ship that was built by American International Shipbuilding, Hog Island, Pennsylvania. Completed in 1919 as Labette for USSB. To Lykes Brothers-Ripley Steamship Co Inc in 1933. To MoWT in 1941 and renamed Empire Ortolan. Sold in 1946 to Stanhope Steamship Co. Ltd. and renamed Stanland. Sold in 1949 to Alma Shipping Co SA, Panama and renamed Alma. Operated under the management of Faros Shipping Co. Scrapped in May 1953 at Milford Haven, Pembrokeshire.

=== Empire Orwell (I) ===
Empire Orwell was a 3,132 GRT cargo ship that was built by Armstrong Whitworth & Co Ltd, Newcastle upon Tyne. Completed in 1921 as Vindeggen. Sold in 1939 to W Traber & Co, Hamburg and renamed Olga Traber. Seized in May 1945 at Kiel, to MoWT and renamed Empire Orwell. Allocated to USSR in 1946 and renamed Poltava.

=== Empire Orwell (II) ===
Empire Orwell was a 17,362 GRT liner built by Blohm & Voss, Hamburg. Launched on 16 July 1936 as TS Pretoria for the Deutsche Ost-Afrika Linie. Maiden voyage to Cape Town started on 19 December 1936, but ran aground at East Lepe, in the Solent. Undamaged and later refloated. Requisitioned in 1939 by the Kriegsmarine and used as a submarine depot ship. Converted to a hospital ship in 1940. Seized in May 1945 at Copenhagen, To MoWT and renamed Empire Doon. Converted to a troopship at Newcastle upon Tyne. Operated under the management of the Orient Steam Navigation Co Ltd. Problems with her boilers meant that she had to be withdrawn from service. She was towed back to the UK from Port Said, Egypt and laid up off Southend-on-Sea. She was re-boilered by J I Thorneycroft & Co, Southampton. Renamed Empire Orwell on completion of refit in January 1950. Served as a troopship in 1956 during the Suez crisis, landing troops in Cyprus and evacuating troops from the Canal Zone. Withdrawn in December 1957 and laid up at Isle of Portland. Chartered in 1958 to Pan-Islamic Steamship Co, Karachi, then sold later that year to Ocean Steamship Co, Liverpool. Operated under the management of A Holt & Co. Refitted in 1958 by Barclay, Curle & Co, Glasgow. Intended to be renamed Dardanus but was renamed Gunung Djati. Sold in 1962 to the Indonesian Government. Sold in 1964 to Perushaan Pelajaran Arafat, Djakarta. New diesel engines fitted in 1972 in Hong Kong. To the Indonesian Navy in 1979 and renamed KRI Tanjung Pandan, with pennant number 971. Laid up in 1981 in Tanjung Priok as an accommodation vessel. Sold in 1987 to shipbreakers in Taiwan.

=== Empire Oryx ===
Empire Oryx was a 5,756 GRT (8,800 DWT) cargo ship that was built by Columbia River Shipbuilding Corp, Portland. Completed as West Harshaw for USSB. To Lykes Bros-Ripley Steamship Co Inc. in 1933. To MoWT in 1940 and renamed Empire Oryx. Renamed Empire Robin in 1941. Allocated in 1942 to the Dutch Government and renamed Ferdinand Bol. Collided on 30 July 1942 with SS Norse King and sank at 45°21′N 59°28′W.

=== Empire Osbourne ===
Empire Osbourne was a 2,906 GRT cargo ship that was built by William Gray & Co. Ltd., West Hartlepool. Launched on 28 January 1944 and completed in March 1944. Damaged on 20 December 1944 by a mine in the River Seine. Sold in 1946 to Uskport Steamship Co. Ltd. and renamed Uskport. Operated under the management of R. W. Jones & co, Newport, Wales. Sold in 1957 to the Cuban Government and renamed Rio Damuji. Operated by Empresa Navigazione Mambisa. Ran aground on 3 February 1970 at Punta Maya, Varadero Peninsular, Cuba (23°06′N 81°24′W). Equipment salvaged then ship abandoned after further gale damage.

=== Empire Otter ===
Empire Otter was a 4,627 GRT cargo ship that was built by International Shipbuilding Co, Pascagoula, Mississippi. Launched in 1920 as Torino by Società de Navigazione Italo-Americana, Italy. Never complete or delivered to the intended customer. To Morecraft Transportation Corp, New York in 1925. To Durham Navigation Corporation in 1932, still uncompleted. To American Mineral Spirits Co, New York in 1938. Converted to a tanker. To MoWT in 1940 and renamed Empire Otter. Struck a mine on 16 February 1941 and sank 25 nautical miles (46 km) southwest of Hartland Point, Devon.

=== Empire Ouse ===
Empire Ouse was a 4,833 GRT cargo ship that was built by Burntisland Shipbuilding Company Ltd, Burntisland, Fife. Launched in 1937 as Ginnheim for Unterweser Reederei, Bremen. Seized in May 1945 at Brunsbüttel. To MoWT and renamed Empire Ouse. Allocated to the Dutch Government in 1946 and renamed Eindhoven. Sold in 1947 to Van Uden Scheepsvaart Maatschappij, Rotterdam and renamed Parkhaven. Sold in 1953 to E Oldendorff, Lübeck and renamed Christopher Oldendorff. Scrapped in 1963 at Ferrol, Spain.

=== Empire Outpost ===
Empire Outpost was a 6,978 GRT cargo ship that was built by Harland & Wolff Ltd, Belfast. Launched on 31 May 1943 and completed in August 1943. Allocated in 1945 to the French Government and renamed Pilote Garnier. Sold in 1960 to Compagnia Navigazione Olissman Ltda, Greece and renamed Kyra Hariklia. Ran aground on 7 February 1966 at Malmö. Refloated on 11 February, towed to port and cargo discharged. Sailed to Hamburg where she was drydocked, extensive damage to the bottom and stern found, uneconomic to repair. Scrapped in April 1966 in Hamburg.

=== Empire Oykell ===
Empire Oykell was a 2,623 GRT cargo ship that was built by Flensburger Schiffbau-Gesellschaft. Launched in 1930 as Adele Traber for W Traber & Co, Hamburg. Seized in May 1945 in the Kiel Canal. To MoWT and renamed Empire Oykell. Allocated to the Norwegian Government in 1946 and renamed Bruse. Sold in 1958 to Leif Hoegh & Co, Norway and renamed Hoegh Bruse. Renamed Hoegh Collier in 1959. sold in 1961 to O/Y Propsshipping Ltd, Finland and renamed Pomo. Sold in 1967 to Rauma Chartering Ltd, Finland and renamed Tomi. Scrapped in June 1968 at Spezia, Italy.

== Sources ==
- Mitchell, W. H.; Sawyer, L. A. (1990). The Empire Ships (2nd ed.). London, New York, Hamburg, Hong Kong: Lloyd's of London Press Ltd. ISBN 1-85044-275-4.
