= Rosalind (1890 ship) =

British-built steamship that sank in 1914

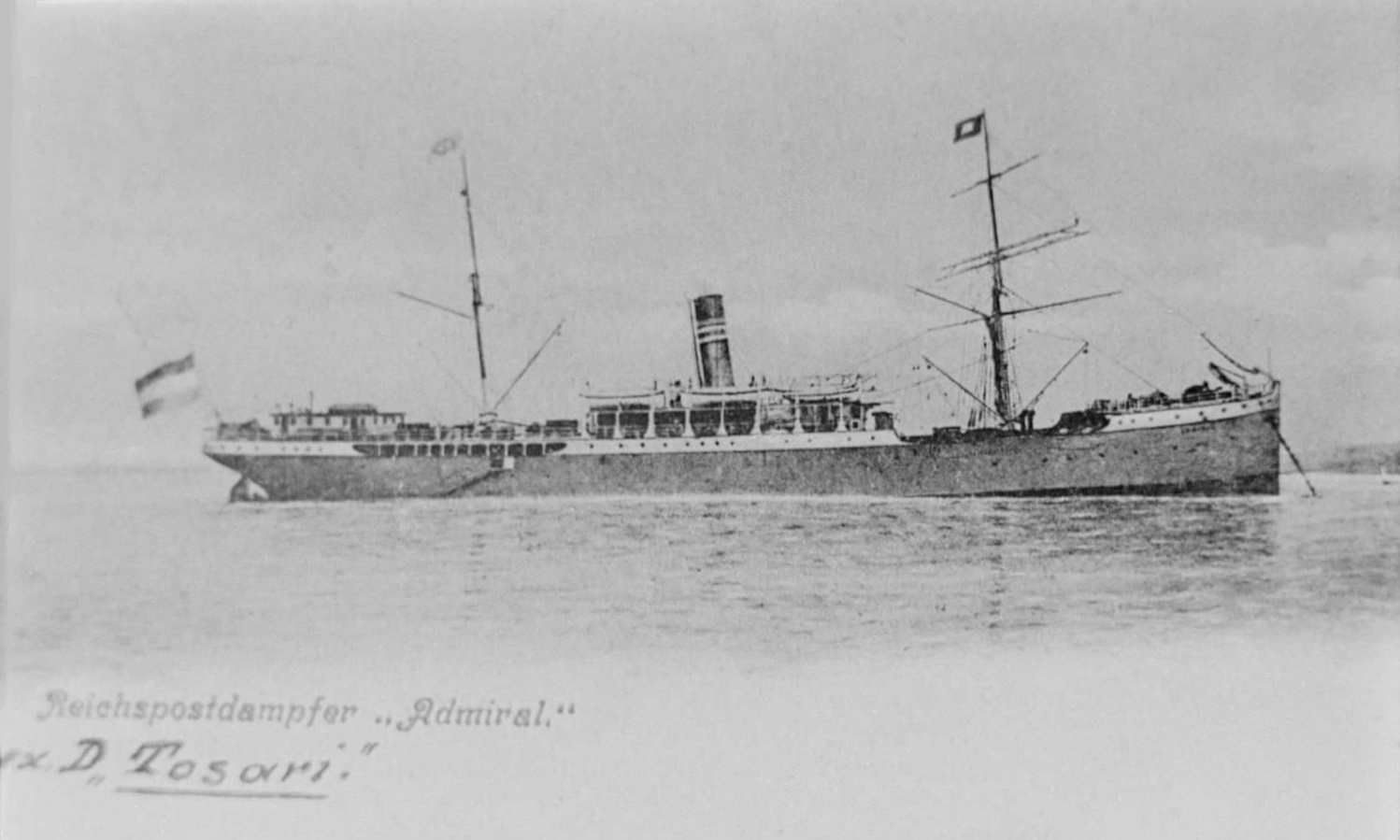
- The ship as Admiral

History
- Name: 1890: Tosari; 1891: Admiral; 1902: Rosalind; 1912: City of Sydney
- Namesake: 1890: Tosari in Java; 1902: Rosalind in As You Like It; 1912: Sydney, Nova Scotia
- Owner: 1890: Dampfschiffs Rhederei zu Hamburg; 1891: Deutsche Ost-Afrika Linie; 1902: NY, Newfoundland & Halifax SS Co; 1914: St Laurence Shipping Co
- Operator: 1902: CT Bowring
- Port of registry: 1890: (German Empire) Hamburg; 1902: (United Kingdom) Liverpool; 1914: (United Kingdom) Montreal
- Route: 1890: Hamburg – Dutch East Indies; 1902: St. John's – New York
- Builder: CS Swan & Hunter, Wallsend
- Yard number: 159
- Launched: 30 October 1890
- Completed: 20 December 1890
- Identification: 1890: code letters RJFK; 1902: UK official number 115274; by 1914: wireless call sign VFO
- Fate: wrecked 1914

General characteristics
- Type: cargo liner
- Tonnage: 2,470 GRT, 1,680 NRT
- Length: 312 ft (95 m) overall; 300.4 ft (91.6 m) registered
- Beam: 41.1 ft (12.5 m)
- Depth: 21.6 ft (6.6 m)
- Decks: 2
- Installed power: 319 NHP; 2,250 ihp
- Propulsion: 1 × triple-expansion engine; 1 × screw
- Sail plan: brigantine
- Speed: 11 knots (20 km/h)
- Crew: 50
- Sensors & processing systems: by 1910: submarine signalling
- Notes: sister ships: Salatiga, Lawang, Priok

Rosalind was a steam cargo liner that was launched in England in 1890 for Dampfschiffs Rhederei zu Hamburg as Tosari. In 1891 Deutsche Ost-Afrika Linie (DOAL) bought her and renamed her Admiral. In 1902 the Bowring Brothers' New York, Newfoundland & Halifax Steamship Company ("Red Cross Line") bought her and renamed her Rosalind. In 1912 the St Laurence Shipping Company bought her and renamed her City of Sydney. She was wrecked off the coast of Nova Scotia in 1914.

She was the first of two DOAL ships that were called Admiral. The second was launched in 1905, seized by Portugal in 1916, and renamed Lourenço Marques.

She was the first of three Bowring Brothers ships that were named Admiral. The second was built in 1913, and sunk by torpedo in 1917. The third was launched in 1911 as Lady Gwendolen, bought and renamed Rosalind in 1919, and sold and renamed in 1928.

== Building ==
In 1890 and 1891 Dampfschiffs Rhederei zu Hamburg took delivery of four ships to the same design from shipbuilders on the River Tyne. Sir WG Armstrong, Mitchell and Company at Low Walker launched Salatiga in September 1890 and completed her in October. She was followed by three sister ships built by CS Swan and Hunter at Wallsend. Yard number 159 was launched on 30 October 1890 as Tosari and completed on 20 December. Yard number 160 was launched in November 1890 as Lawang and completed in February 1891. Yard number 161 was launched in December 1890 as Priok and completed in February 1891.

Dampfschiffs Rhederei zu Hamburg traded as "Sunda Linie", named after either the Sunda Strait between Sumatra and Java, or the Sunda Islands, which is the entire archipelago including Sumatra, Java, and Borneo. Its ships traded between Hamburg and the Dutch East Indies via Rotterdam. The company took the names for its four new ships from places on the island of Java. Tosari is a village in the mountains of East Java.

Tosari's lengths were 312 ft (95 m) overall and 300.4 ft (91.6 m) registered. Her beam was 41.1 ft (12.5 m) and her depth was 21.6 ft (6.6 m). Her tonnages were 2,470 GRT and 1,680 NRT. She had a single screw, driven by a three-cylinder triple-expansion engine built by the Wallsend Slipway & Engineering Company. It was rated at 319 NHP or 2,250 ihp, and gave her a speed of 11 knots (20 km/h). The ship had two masts, and was rigged as a brigantine.

== Tosari and Admiral ==
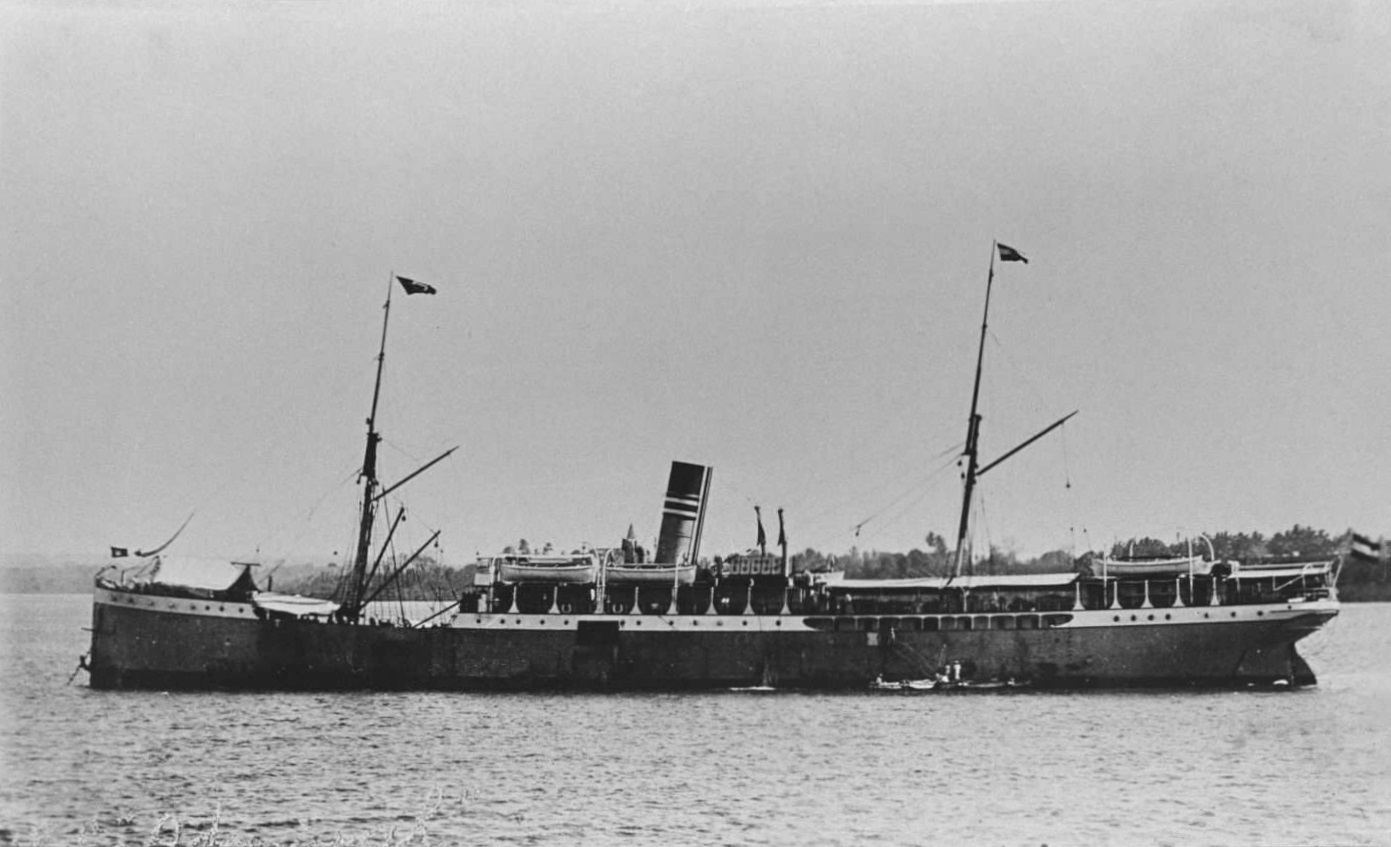
Sister ship General, formerly Salatiga

Dampfschiffs Rhederei zu Hamburg registered Tosari in Hamburg. Her code letters were RJFK. In 1891 DOAL bought the ship and renamed her Admiral. DOAL ran scheduled passenger and cargo services between Hamburg and German colonies in Africa, including German East Africa, German South West Africa, and Kamerun. In 1894 DOAL bought her sister ship Salatiga and renamed her General.

== Rosalind and City of Sydney ==
On 9 May 1902 Bowring Brothers' New York, Newfoundland & Halifax Steamship Company bought the ship and renamed her after Rosalind in William Shakespeare's play As You Like It. She was registered in Liverpool, and her United Kingdom official number was 115274. Her scheduled route was between St. John's and New York. The service was reputed to be as popular for the views from the ship as for the destinations. Passengers included James and Clara Russell, who named their daughter Rosalind Russell after the ship. She treasured a picture of the ship during her film career.

By 1910 Rosalind was equipped with wireless telegraphy and submarine signalling. In 1912 she was renamed City of Sydney; after Sydney, Nova Scotia; and registered in Montreal. On 14 November that year she struck the tug Douglas H. Thomas amidships in Halifax Harbour, Nova Scotia. Four men aboard the tug were killed; she began to take on water; and the tug's Captain ran her ashore to prevent her sinking. By 1914 City of Sydney's owner was the St Laurence Shipping Company, Ltd, and her wireless call sign was VFO.

== Loss ==
On 13 or 14 March 1914, City of Sydney left New York for St John's via Halifax. She carried 13 passengers and 35 or 40 crew (accounts differ). In thick fog at 03:00 hrs on 17 March her Master, Captain McDonald, was trying to find a lightship off the mouth of Halifax harbour when she struck Shag Rock, which is part of the Southwest Ledges off Sambro, Nova Scotia. The rock is about 1 mile (1.6 km) southeast of Sambro Island Light, which was founding its fog signal at regular intervals at the time. Several feet of water rose in her engine room and stokehold, and water was 5 feet (1.5 m) deep in her forward cargo hold. Her bow was stuck fast on the rock, and she was settling by the stern.

Her wireless operator broadcast distress signals, which the Canadian Marconi station at Camperdown received, and forwarded by telephone to Halifax. Tugs from Halifax, and fishing craft from Sambro and Duncan's Cove put to sea. The small steam vessel Rosemary reached City of Sydney about 08:00 hrs. City of Sydney launched a lifeboat; which transferred 11 of her passengers and 30 of her crew to Rosemary; which landed them at Halifax.

The abandoned City of Sydney remained on Shag rock, pounded by the sea. Some of her cargo was salvaged. By 18 March her after part was almost awash. On 20 March she broke her back, and her bow slipped off the rock into deep water.

== Bibliography ==
- Browne, Patrick William (1909). Where the Fishers Go: The Story of Labrador. Labrador: Cochrane.
- Kresse, Walter (1964). Aus der Vergangenheit der Reiherstiegwerft in Hamburg (in German). Hamburg: Deutsche Werft.
- Lloyd's Register of British and Foreign Shipping. Vol. I.–Steamers. London: Lloyd's Register of Shipping. 1891 – via Internet Archive.
- Lloyd's Register of British and Foreign Shipping. Vol. I.–Steamers. London: Lloyd's Register of Shipping. 1892 – via Internet Archive.
- Lloyd's Register of British and Foreign Shipping. Vol. I.–Steamers. London: Lloyd's Register of Shipping. 1901 – via Internet Archive.
- Lloyd's Register of British and Foreign Shipping. Vol. I.–Steamers. London: Lloyd's Register of Shipping. 1902 – via Internet Archive.
- Lloyd's Register of British and Foreign Shipping. Vol. I.–Steamers. London: Lloyd's Register of Shipping. 1910 – via Internet Archive.
- Lloyd's Register of British and Foreign Shipping. Vol. II.–Steamers. London: Lloyd's Register of Shipping. 1912 – via Internet Archive.
- Lloyd's Register of Shipping. Vol. II.–Steamers. London: Lloyd's Register of Shipping. 1914 – via Internet Archive.
- The Marconi Press Agency Ltd (1914). The Year Book of Wireless Telegraphy and Telephony. London: The Marconi Press Agency Ltd.
- Mercantile Navy List. London. 1903 – via Crew List Index Project.
- Mercantile Navy List. London. 1914 – via Crew List Index Project.
- O'Neill, Paul (1975). The Story of St John's Newfoundland. Vol. 2: A Seaport Legacy. Erin: Pree Porepic. ISBN 978-0888781109.
