= Duala =

Duala or Douala can refer to:

== Relating to Cameroon ==
- Duala people, an ethnic group in Cameroon
- Duala language, part of the Bantu languages
- Douala, the largest city in Cameroon, founded by the Duala people
- Rudolf Duala Manga Bell (1873–1914), a Duala king and resistance leader
  - Alexandre Douala Manga Bell (1897–1966), son of above
- Roudolphe Douala (born 1978), Cameroonian footballer

== Other ==
- Douala, Guinea, a village in the Nzérékoré Prefecture, Guinea
- Duala language, alternative spelling for Australian Aboriginal Dhuwal language
- German ship Duala, a Kriegsmarine accommodation ship
- Doula, someone who helps another through pregnancy and childbirth.
