= Benue =

Benue may refer to:

- Benue River, a river in Cameroon and Nigeria
- Benue State, a state in Nigeria
  - Benue-Plateau State, a former administrative division in Nigeria
- Benue Trough, a major geological formation in Nigeria
- Benue–Congo languages, a major language group in Africa
- SS Benue, a Hansa A type cargo ship in service 1944-45
