= Usaramo =

German passenger ship

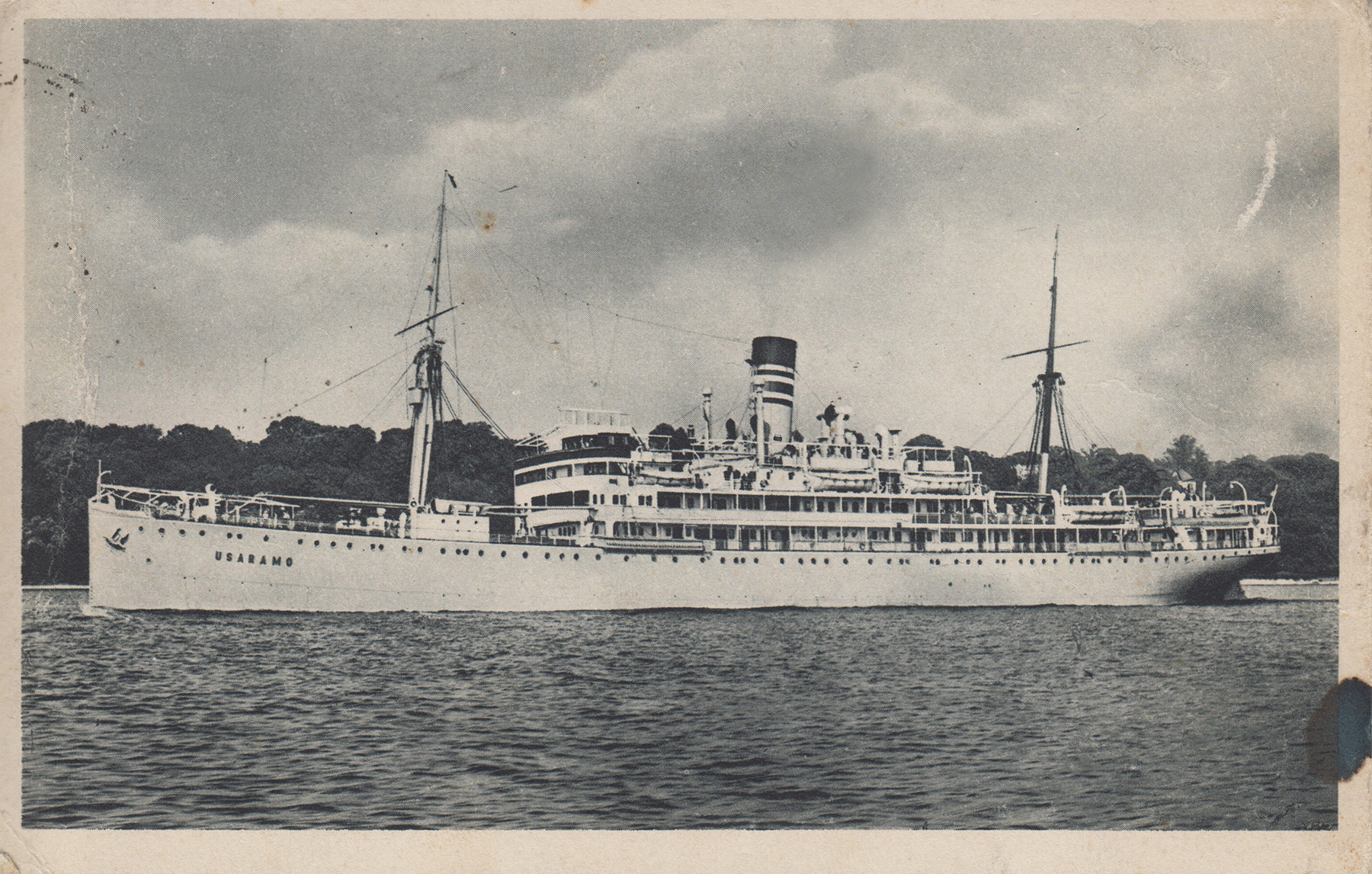
- SS Usaramo

History
- Name: Usaramo
- Owner: Deutsche Ost-Afrika Linie
- Route: Europe-Africa
- Builder: Blohm + Voss
- Launched: 2 October 1920
- Completed: 1921
- Fate: Sunk 1944

General characteristics
- Type: Steamship
- Tonnage: 7,758 GRT
- Installed power: Steam
- Propulsion: Single screw
- Capacity: 264 passengers
- Crew: 107

The Usaramo was the first German passenger ship built after World War I and named after a location in the central highlands of German East Africa (now Tanzania). She had a crew of 107, could carry 264 passengers and was powered by steam turbine. Her building number was 389 and her home port was Hamburg. Her sister ships were the Ussukuma of the Deutsche Ost-Afrika Linie and the Wangoni of the Woermann-Linie.

She was launched in 1920 at the Hamburg shipyard of Blohm + Voss and entered service with the Deutsche Ost-Afrika Linie the following year. On 6 August 1936, 18 days after the start of the Spanish Civil War, the Usaramo arrived at Cádiz on a secret mission, with a load of 16 aircraft, including a single Ju 87 A-0 (the V4 prototype) with allocated serial number 29-1 that was assigned to the VJ/88, the experimental Staffel of the Condor Legion's fighter wing; along with 30 antiaircraft guns, ammunition and supplies that were hurriedly carried by train to Seville.

In 1938, Austrian author Franziska Tausig acquired two tickets for the Usaramo, a ship that was supposed to be scrapped in Japan, which transported Jews to Shanghai on the way.

In October 1940, she was requisitioned by Nazi Germany's Kriegsmarine and apparently used as an accommodation ship. On 10 December 1940 the ship was bombed and sunk at Bordeaux, was refloated but sunk again on 25 August 1944 during an airstrike in the Gironde estuary. The ship was lifted and scrapped after the end of the war.
