= SS Ussukuma =

German passenger ship

Coordinates: 39°24′S 57°15′W

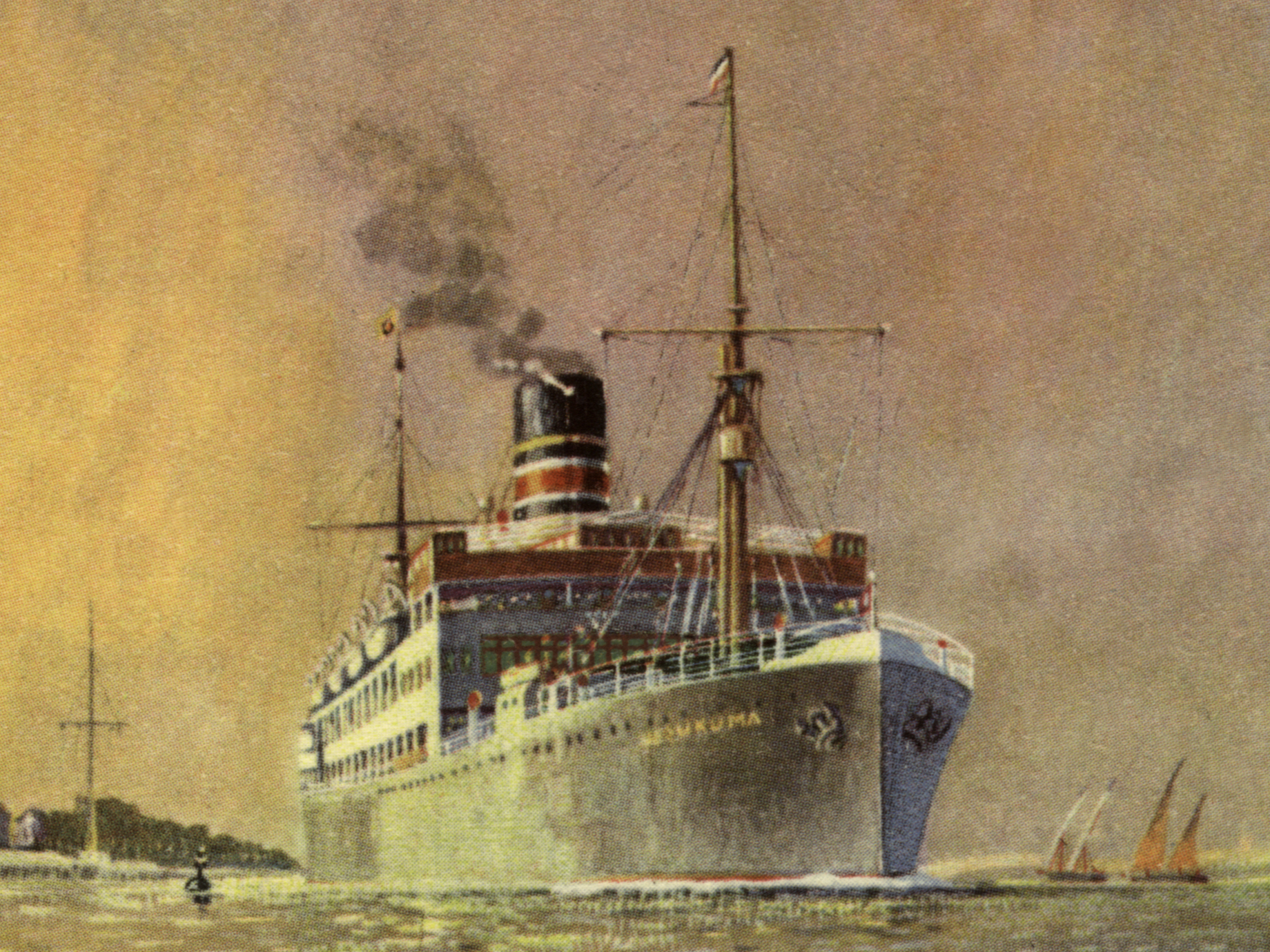
- SS Ussukuma

History
- Name: Ussukuma
- Owner: Deutsche Ost-Afrika Linie
- Route: Europe-Africa
- Builder: Blohm + Voss
- Launched: 20 December 1920
- Completed: 8 July 1921
- Fate: Commandeered by Abwehr, scuttled 1939

General characteristics
- Type: Passenger ship
- Tonnage: 9,000 GRT
- Length: 127.6 m (418 ft 8 in)
- Beam: 17.1 m (56 ft 1 in)
- Installed power: Steam turbine
- Propulsion: 2 × steam turbines SR geared to a single shaft, one screw
- Speed: 14 knots (26 km/h; 16 mph)
- Capacity: 264 passengers
- Crew: 107

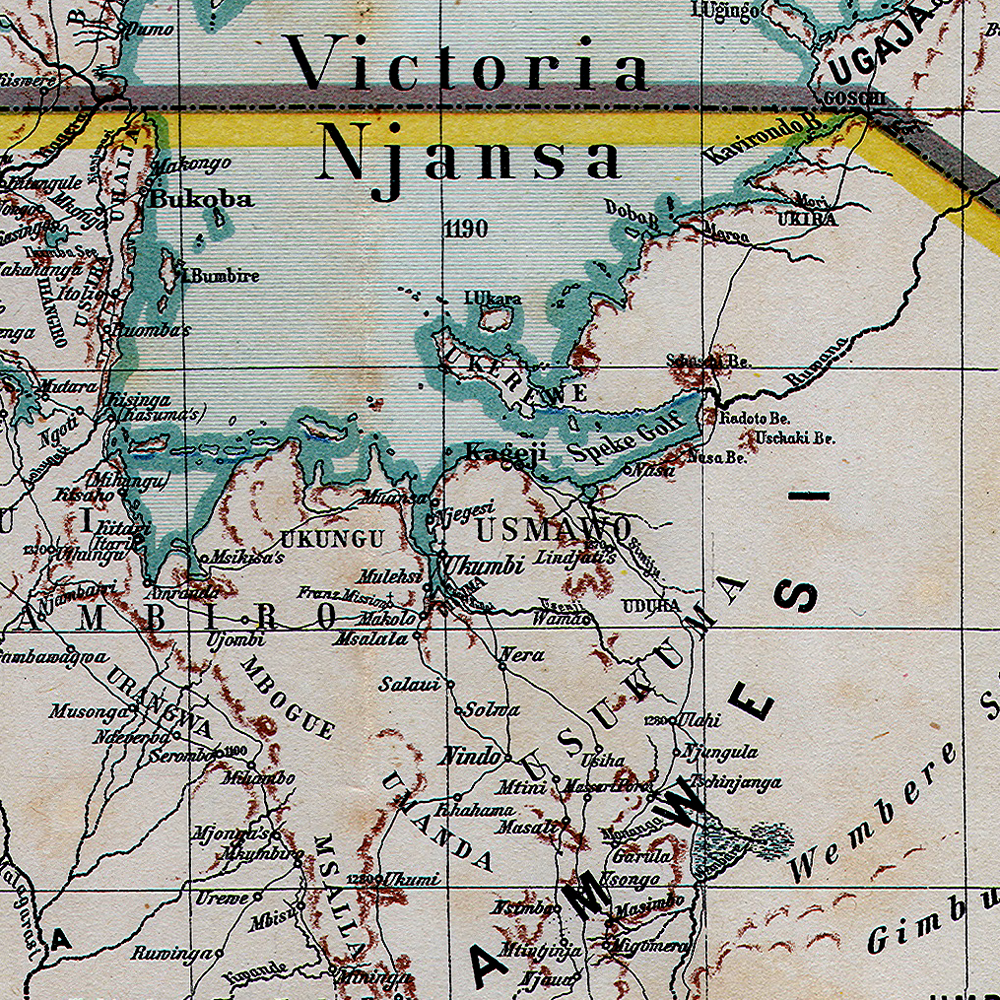
"Usukuma" – map of the location after which the ship was named.

Ussukuma was a German passenger ship named after a location in the central highlands of German East Africa (now Tanzania). On 6 December 1939, only a few months into the Second World War, she was scuttled off the coast of Argentina. In January 2008, her wreck was identified by the Argentine Navy in 70 metres (230 ft) of water, 62 miles (100 km) off Necochea.

== Construction and career ==
Ussukuma had a crew of 107, could carry 264 passengers and was powered by steam turbine. Her building number was 389 and her home port was Hamburg. Her sister ships were the Usaramo of the Deutsche Ost-Afrika Linie and the Wangoni of the Woermann-Linie.

She was launched on 20 December 1920 at the Hamburg shipyard of Blohm + Voss and entered service with the Deutsche Ost-Afrika Linie on 8 July 1921. Ussukuma used 13 ports in Europe, 38 in Africa and 1 in Aden. Her last round trip to Africa began from Hamburg on 15 July 1939. On 19 August, she left Cape Town and by 26 August had reached Lorenço Marques.

== Action in World War II ==
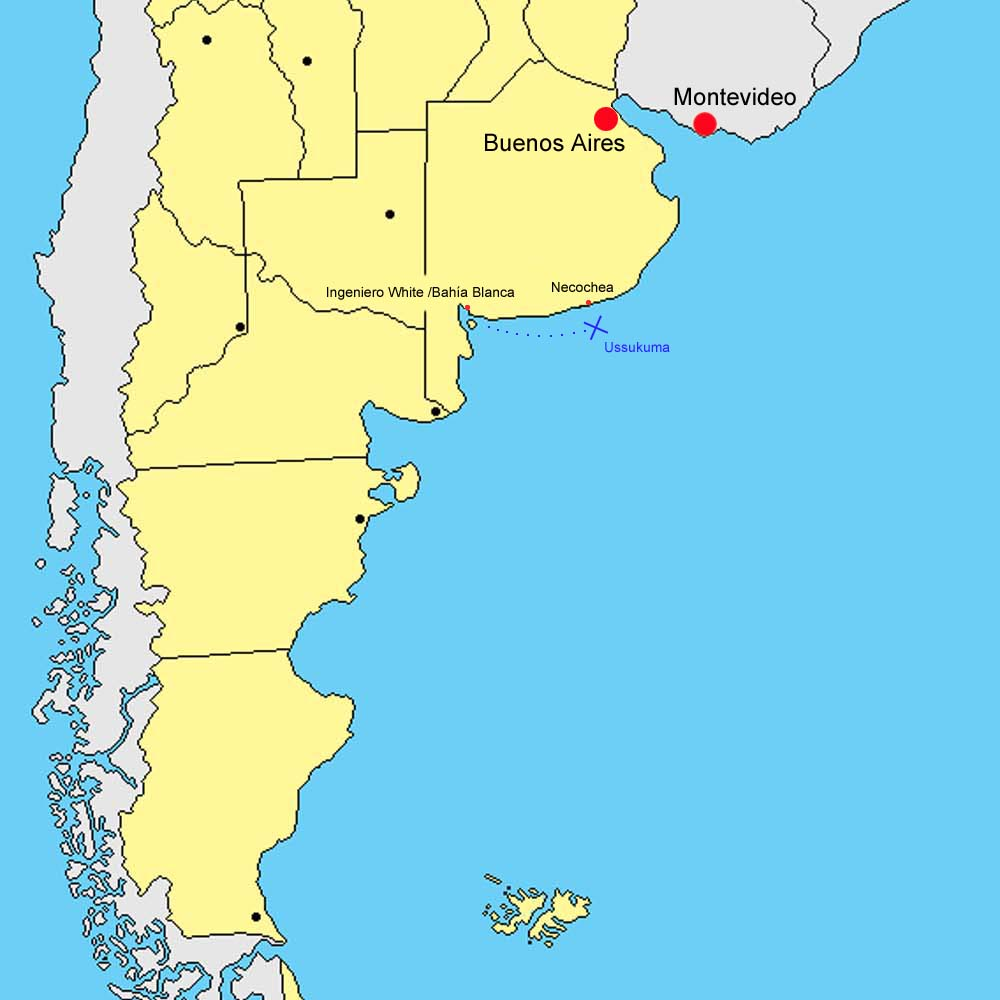
Location of the wreck of the Ussukuma

On the outbreak of war on 1 September 1939 she was lying off Lorenço Marques and was taken over by the Abwehr for service in the South Atlantic. In late September she went to South America and on 11 October reached Bahía Blanca in Argentina, where she stayed until 4 December Her captain Karl Schulte fell ill there and was replaced by Hugo Wilmsen from the Nienburg.

On 4 December 1939, the Ussukuma left Bahía Blanca in the direction of Montevideo in Uruguay, possibly to help the pocket battleship Admiral Graf Spee, also heading for Montevideo. On 5 December, towards evening, the Ussukuma met the British cruiser HMS Ajax. Ajax had been looking for the Admiral Graf Spee (later meeting her in the Battle of the River Plate on 13 December) and had been informed of the departure of the Ussukuma by the British naval attaché in Montevideo and by a Dutch ship which had met the Ussukuma shortly after the latter's departure. The Ajax threatened not to rescue the German crew if they left their ship but also ordered them not to sink it. Captain Wilmsen decided to scuttle her nevertheless and the Ajax fired three rounds at her, the first across the bows, the second whilst she was lowering her lifeboats and the third when the boats were dropped into the water, 62 miles from the coast. The Ussukuma sank during the night of 5 December or morning of 6 December.

The 107 passengers and crew members were rescued by the Ajax and interned as enemy civilians. The cruiser HMS Cumberland took them first to the Falkland Islands, then in 1940 to Camp Baviaanspoort near Pretoria in South Africa, from which they were released at the end of the war.

The vessel's remains appeared on charts as an unnamed wreck for years and in January 2008 became "the first Nazi wreck to be identified in Argentine waters in decades."
