= SS Sukhumi =

History
- Name: Benue (1944-45); Empire Gable (1945-46); Sukhumi (1946-69)
- Owner: Deutsche Afrika Linien (1944-45); Ministry of War Transport (1945-46); Soviet Government (1946-69)
- Operator: Deutsche Afrika Linien (1944-45); Angel, Son & Co. Ltd (1945-46); Murmansk Shipping Co (1946-69)
- Port of registry: (Nazi Germany) Hamburg, Germany (1944-45); London, United Kingdom (1945-46); Murmansk, Soviet Union (1946-69)
- Builder: A Vuyk & Zonen
- Yard number: 688
- Launched: 2 February 1944
- Identification: Code Letters UOOL (1946–69); IMO number: 5343421 ( –1969)
- Fate: Scrapped 1969

General characteristics
- Class & type: Hansa A type Cargo ship
- Tonnage: 1,923 GRT 900 NRT, 3,000 DWT
- Length: 85.24 m (279 ft 8 in)
- Beam: 13.26 m (43 ft 6 in)
- Depth: 7.49 m (24 ft 7 in)
- Installed power: Compound steam engine, 1,200IHP
- Speed: 10.5 knots (19.4 km/h)

Sukhumi (Russian: Суху́ми) was a Hansa A Type cargo ship which was built as Benue in 1944 by A Vuyk & Zonen, Capelle aan den Ijssel, Overijssel, Netherlands for the Deutsche Afrika Linien, Hamburg. She was seized as a prize of war in 1945, passing to the Ministry of War Transport and renamed Empire Gable. Allocated to the Soviet Union in 1946, she served until 1969 when she was scrapped at Bo'ness, Lothian, United Kingdom.

== Description ==
The ship was 85.24 m (279 ft 8 in) long, with a beam of 13.46 m (44 ft 2 in). She had a depth of 7.49 m (24 ft 7 in). She was assessed as 1,925 GRT, 900 NRT, 3,000 DWT.

The ship was propelled by a compound steam engine, which had two cylinders of 42 cm (16 7/16 inches) and two cylinders of 90 cm (35 7/16 inches) diameter by 90 cm (35 7/16 inches) stroke. The engine was built by Gebroeders Stork & Co., N.V., Hengelo, Overijssel, Netherlands. Rated at 1,200IHP, it could propel the ship at 10.5 knots (19.4 km/h).

== History ==
Benue was built in 1944 as yard number 688 by A Vuyk & Zonen, Capelle aan den IJssel South Holland, Netherlands under orders from Deutsche Werft, Hamburg, Germany. She was built for the Deutsche Afrika Linien, Hamburg. She was launched on 2 February and completed on 25 July.

Benue was seized as a prize of war at Cuxhaven on 7 June 1945 and was passed to the Ministry of War Transport. She was renamed Empire Gable. Her port of registry was London and she was operated under the management of Angel, Son & Co. Ltd., Cardiff.

In February 1946, she was allocated to the Soviet Union under the Potsdam Agreement. She was renamed Sukhumi and was placed under the management of the Murmansk Shipping Company, and the Code Letters UOOL were allocated. In February 1961, a sailor from Sukhumi rescued a boy who fell into the water at Granton, Lothian, United Kingdom when his raft collided with the ship. With their introduction in the 1960s, Sukhumi was allocated the IMO Number 5343421. She served until 1969, arriving at Bo'ness, Lothian on 27 November for scrapping by P & W MacLellan.
