= HS Tabora =

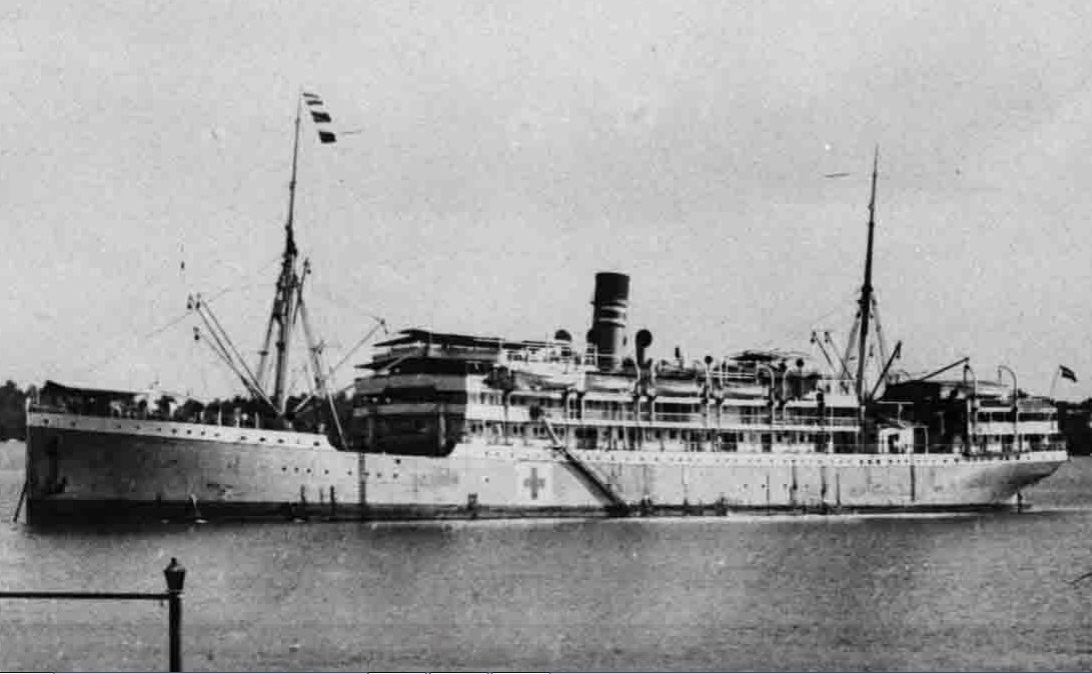
- HS Tabora, ca. 1916.

History

German Empire
- Name: SS Tabora (1912-1914); (Red Cross) HS Tabora (1914-1916)
- Namesake: Tabora, Tanzania
- Owner: Deutsche Ost-Afrika Linie (DOAL)
- Port of registry: German Empire, Hamburg
- Builder: Blohm & Voss
- Yard number: 211
- Launched: 18 April 1912
- Completed: 29 June 1912
- Acquired: 29 June 1912
- Maiden voyage: July 1912
- In service: 29 June 1912
- Fate: Sunk 26 March 1916; Wreck scrapped 1955

General characteristics
- Type: Passenger ship/Hospital ship
- Tonnage: 8,022 GRT
- Length: 142.9 metres (468 ft 10 in)
- Beam: 16.5 metres (54 ft 2 in)
- Installed power: 2 Triple Expansion Engine
- Propulsion: Double screw propellers
- Speed: 13.5 knots
- Capacity: 316 passengers; First Class: 116; Second Class: 112; Third Class: 88

HS Tabora was a German hospital ship that was sunk on 26 March 1916 in the port of Dar es Salaam, German East Africa, by the Royal Navy battleship HMS Vengeance and protected cruisers HMS Challenger and HMS Hyacinth and the Royal Australian Navy protected cruiser HMAS Pioneer.

== Construction ==
SS Tabora was built at the Blohm & Voss shipyard in Hamburg, Germany. She was launched on 18 April 1912 and completed on 29 June 1912. The ship was 142.9 metres (468 ft 10 in) long and had a beam of 16.5 metres (54 ft 2 in). She was assessed at 8.022 GRT and had two triple-expansion engines driving double screw propellers.

== Early career ==
During her early career, Tabora often steamed from German East Africa to Germany and sometimes from South Africa to Southampton in the United Kingdom. In 1914, when World War I broke out, Tabora was converted into a hospital ship for the German colonies in East Africa.

=== World War I and sinking ===
The British suspected that Tabora was not a hospital ship but operated as a troopship or ammunition transport ship, disguised as a hospital ship with her sides painted with the Red Cross emblem.

On 26 March 1916, in the port of Dar es Salaam in German East Africa, the Royal Navy battleship HMS Vengeance and protected cruisers HMS Challenger and HMS Hyacinth and the Royal Australian Navy light cruiser HMAS Pioneer approached Tabora. The British demanded that the Germans allow them to inspect Tabora to confirm or debunk their suspicions about her. The Germans did not reply. Pioneer received orders to open fire if the German ship made suspicious moves. After time had passed without a reply from Tabora, Pioneer received orders to fire four warning shots from her 4-inch (102-mm) guns. At the same time, Vengeance signaled Tabora asking her to evacuate any wounded she had on board. When Tabora still did not answer, the British ships and Pioneer opened fire on her. An avalanche of shells hit Tabora, and she quickly caught fire. She was shrouded in thickening clouds of black smoke, took on a list to port, and began to sink. The British ships and Pioneer then steamed away without any return fire from the Germans. Tabora rolled onto her side and came to rest on the harbor bottom on her port side, with her starboard side remaining above water. It is unknown if anyone died in Tabora.

== Aftermath and wreck ==
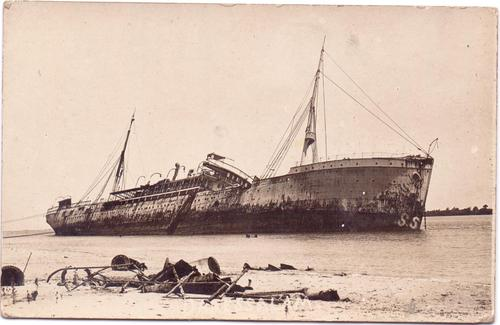
Tabora wreck

The sinking of Tabora went virtually unnoticed by both sides. The German Foreign Office did not protest against the British and Australian action, nor did they issue a statement about the incident. Germany's behavior after the incident indicated that Tabora was not a hospital ship protected under Articles X and XI of the Hague Convention of 1907 and that her sinking was not a violation of international maritime law.

The burned-out wreck of Tabora remained in Dar es Salaam harbor until 1955, when she was finally scrapped by the Italian salvage company Mawa Handels Anstalt nearly 40 years after her sinking.
