= SS Lourenço Marques =

German-built passenger steamship

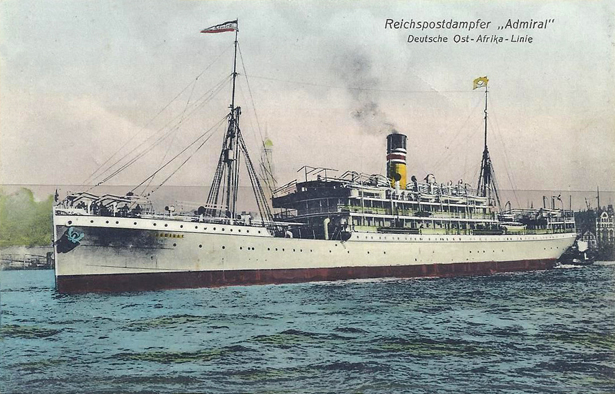
- The ship as Admiral

History
- Name: 1905: Admiral; 1916: Lourenço Marques
- Namesake: 1916: Lourenço Marques
- Owner: 1905: Deutsche Ost-Afrika Linie; 1916: Government of Portugal; 1926: Cia Nacional de Navegação
- Operator: 1916: Transportes Mar do Estado
- Port of registry: 1905: Hamburg; 1916: (Portugal) Lisbon
- Route: 1905: Hamburg – around Africa; 1926: Lisbon – Porto Amélia
- Builder: Blohm+Voss, Hamburg
- Yard number: 178
- Launched: 25 June 1905
- Completed: 23 September 1905
- Maiden voyage: 30 September 1905
- Identification: 1905: code letters RNTK; by 1913: call sign DAL; 1916: code letters HLMA; by 1934: call sign CSBC
- Fate: scrapped in 1950 or '51

General characteristics
- Type: cargo liner
- Tonnage: 6,341 GRT, 3,696 NRT
- Length: 415.9 ft (126.8 m)
- Beam: 50.4 ft (15.4 m)
- Depth: 28.1 ft (8.6 m)
- Decks: 2
- Installed power: 622 NHP
- Propulsion: 2 × triple-expansion engines; 2 × screws
- Speed: 14 knots (26 km/h)
- Capacity: passengers: 72 × 1st class; 112 × 2nd class; 80 × 3rd class
- Troops: about 1,000
- Sensors & processing systems: by 1912: submarine signalling; by 1938: echo sounding device
- Notes: sister ships: Prinzessin, Gertrud Woermann (1905), Adolph Woermann, Gertrud Woermann (1907)

SS Lourenço Marques was a steam cargo liner that was launched in Germany in 1905 as Admiral for Deutsche Ost-Afrika Linie (DOAL). Portugal seized her in 1916 and renamed her after the explorer Lourenço Marques. After a few years operated by Transportes Marítimos do Estado, she had a long career with Companhia Nacional de Navegação (CNN). In the Second World War she took refugees who had fled German-occupied Europe to the United States, and rescued survivors from Allied merchant ships sunk by the German Navy. She was scrapped in Scotland in 1950 or 1951.

This was the second of two DOAL steamships that were called Admiral. The first was launched in 1890 as Tosari, bought by DOAL in 1891 and renamed Admiral, and sold in 1902 and renamed Rosalind.

== Context ==
In 1902 and 1903 DOAL took delivery of three twin-screw cargo liners for its Reichspostdampfer (RPD, or "State Mail Steamship") service, which circumnavigated Africa from Hamburg. The first was Bürgermeister, launched by Flensburger Schiffbau in Flensburg. She was followed in 1903 by two sister ships built in Hamburg: Prinzregent by Blohm+Voss, and Feldmarschall by Reiherstieg.

Later in 1903 the Herero people rebelled against the German Empire. Germany responded by sending troops and materiel to South West Africa, which increased demand for merchant ships. DOAL and its parent company, Woermann-Linie, responded by ordering new ships based on the design of Bürgermeister and her sisters. In 1905 Blohm & Voss launched Admiral, Prinzessin, and Gertrud Woermann. In 1906 Reiherstieg launched Adolph Woermann.

In 1907 Hamburg America Line (HAPAG) bought Gertrud Woermann and renamed her Windhuk, while Reiherstieg launched a sister ship that was planned as Helmuth Woermann but completed as a new Gertrud Woermann. The sale was part of a deal in 1907 in which HAPAG bought eight DOAL steamships, and took 25 percent of DOAL's West African traffic, to help DOAL resist competition from Norddeutscher Lloyd.

== Specifications ==
Admiral's registered length was 415.9 ft (126.8 m), her beam was 50.4 ft (15.4 m), and her depth was 28.1 ft (8.6 m). She had berths for 264 passengers: 72 in first class; 112 in second class; and 80 in third class. Her tonnages were 6,341 GRT and 3,696 NRT. She had a pair of three-cylinder triple-expansion engines. Their combined power was rated at 622 NHP, and gave her a speed of 14 knots (26 km/h).

== Admiral ==
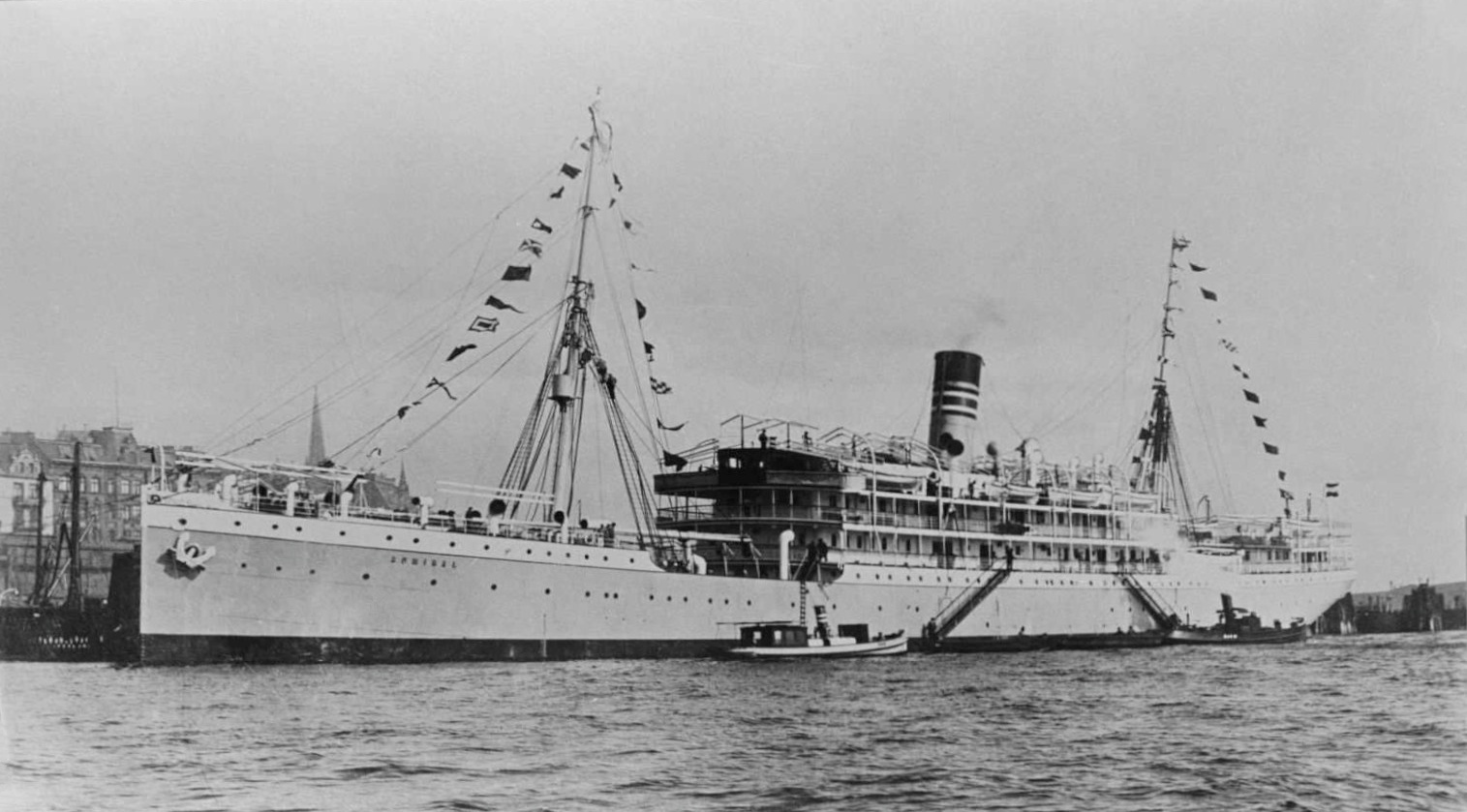
Admiral dressed overall

DOAL registered Admiral at Hamburg. Her code letters were RNTK. She left Hamburg on her maiden voyage on 30 September 1905. DOAL ran its service around Africa in both directions; clockwise and anti-clockwise; with sailings form Hamburg every four weeks. The service frequency was increased to every three weeks from 1907, and every fortnight from 1912. Also by 1912, Admiral was equipped with wireless telegraphy and submarine signalling. By 1913 her wireless call sign was DAL.

When the First World War began in August 1914, Germany ordered its merchant ships to head for the nearest German or neutral port. Admiral took refuge in Delagoa Bay (now Maputo Bay) in Moçambique.

== Lourenço Marques ==
On 23 February 1916 Portugal started seizing German and Austro-Hungarian merchant ships in its ports: first in Lisbon, and then in ports elsewhere in Portugal and the Portuguese Empire. On 9 March Germany declared war on Portugal.

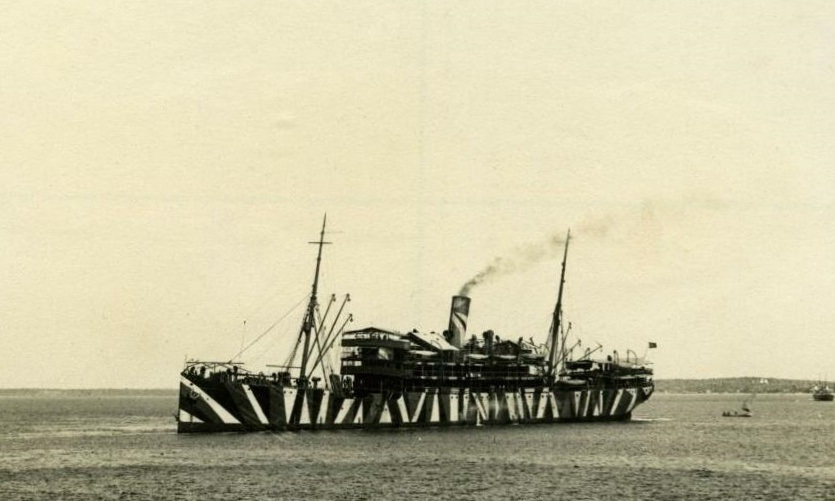
The ship as Lourenço Marques in First World War dazzle camouflage

Portuguese authorities seized Admiral in Lourenço Marques (now Maputo), and renamed her Lourenço Marques. She was registered in Lisbon, and her code letters were HLMA. Transportes Marítimos do Estado managed her for the Government of Portugal. In 1919 she repatriated troops from Moçambique to Portugal.

By 1926 CNN had acquired Lourenço Marques, and put her on its route between Lisbon and Lourenço Marques via Luanda. By 1934 her call sign was CSBC, and this had superseded her code letters. By 1938 she was equipped with an echo sounding device. Also by 1938, Lourenço Marques' ports of call were Funchal, São Vicente, Praia, Fernando Po (now Bioko), Príncipe, São Tomé, Cabinda, Sazaire, Ambriz, Luanda, Porto Amboim, Novo Redondo (now Sumbe), Lobito, Benguela, and Porto Alexandre (now Tômbua).

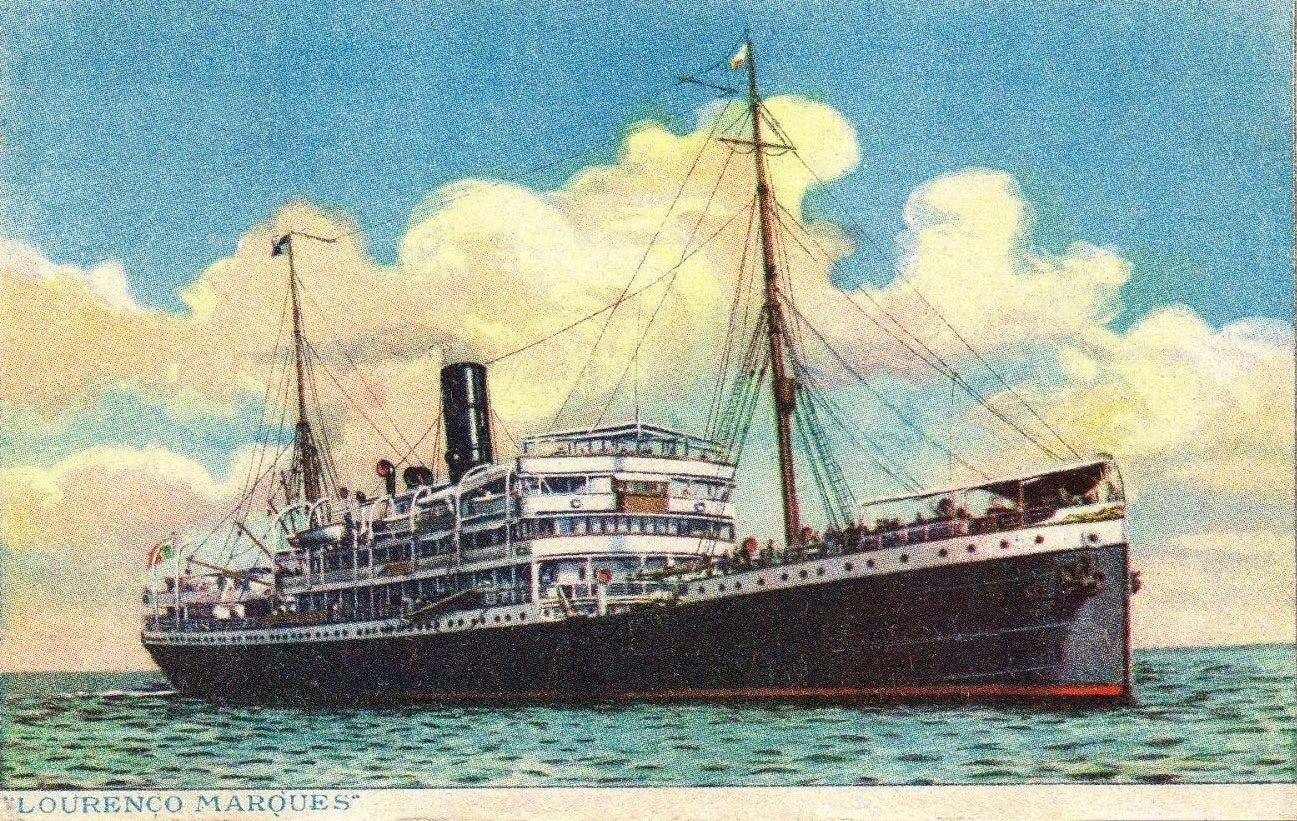
Colour postcard of the ship as Lourenço Marques

Portugal was neutral throughout the Second World War. In July 1940 about 1,000 Portuguese troops left Lisbon aboard Lourenço Marques to reinforce the garrison in Moçambique. In January 1941 the Portuguese Government diverted her to take 305 passengers from Lisbon to the United States. She reached New York on 9 February.

At 05:11 hrs on 30 November 1942 U-181 attacked the Greek cargo ship Cleanthis in the Mozambique Channel. Two torpedoes missed their target, so U-181 continued the attack with its deck guns. Cleanthis caught fire, and at 06:55 hrs sank at position 24°29′S 35°44′E. Her Master and 11 of her crew were killed, but seven officers and 15 crewmen abandoned ship in the only lifeboat that was not destroyed in the attack. A British aircraft sighted the lifeboat, and on 2 December Lourenço Marques rescued the survivors and landed them at the port of Lourenço Marques.

At 23:10 hrs on 11 March 1943 U-556 hit the British cargo ship Aelybryn with two torpedoes off the coast of Natal. The U-boat sank her with a third torpedo as a coup de grâce at 20:32 hrs at position 29°08′S 34°05′E. Nine of her crew were killed, but her Master, 27 crew members, and four DEMS gunners abandoned ship in one lifeboat. On 14 March Lourenço Marques, in passage from Porto Amélia (now Pemba) to Lisbon, sighted the lifeboat and rescued the 32 survivors. On 17 March she landed them at Cape Town. On the same voyage, Lourenço Marques called at Funchal on 11 April. There she embarked nine survivors from the Compagnie Maritime Belge motor ship Moanda, which U-172 had sunk on 29 March.

Lourenço Marques was scrapped in Faslane, Scotland, in 1950 or 1951.

== See also ==
- SS Nyassa

== Bibliography ==
- Hughes, David; Humphries, Peter (1977). In South African Waters Passenger Liners Since 1930. Cape Town: Oxford University Press. ISBN 0-19-570120-8.
- Kludas, Arnold (1988). Die Geschichte der deutschen Passagierschiffahrt. Schriften des Deutschen Schiffahrtsmuseum, Volume 20 (in German). Vol. III: Sprunghaftes Wachstum 1900 bis 1914. Hamburg: Kabel. ISBN 3-8225-0039-9.
- Lloyd's Register of British and Foreign Shipping. Vol. I.–Steamers. London: Lloyd's Register of Shipping. 1904 – via Internet Archive.
- Lloyd's Register of British and Foreign Shipping. Vol. I.–Steamers. London: Lloyd's Register of Shipping. 1907 – via Internet Archive.
- Lloyd's Register of British and Foreign Shipping. Vol. II.–Steamers. London: Lloyd's Register of Shipping. 1912 – via Internet Archive.
- Lloyd's Register of Shipping. Vol. II.–Steamers. London: Lloyd's Register of Shipping. 1919 – via Internet Archive.
- Lloyd's Register of Shipping. Vol. II.–Steamers & Motorships. London: Lloyd's Register of Shipping. 1926 – via Internet Archive.
- Lloyd's Register of Shipping. Vol. II.–Steamers and Motorships of 300 tons gross and over. London: Lloyd's Register of Shipping. 1934 – via Southampton City Council.
- Lloyd's Register of Shipping. Vol. II.–Steamers and Motorships of 300 tons gross and over. London: Lloyd's Register of Shipping. 1938 – via Southampton City Council.
- The Marconi Press Agency Ltd (1913). The Year Book of Wireless Telegraphy and Telephony. London: The St Katherine Press.
- Reinke-Kunze, Christine (1994). Die Geschichte der Reichspostdampfer (in German). Herford: Köhlers Verlagsgesellschaft. ISBN 3-7822-0618-5.
