= USS Lejeune =

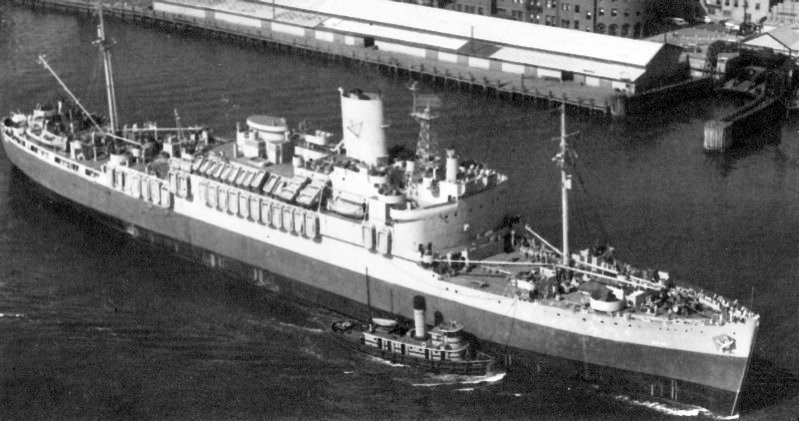

History

Germany
- Name: Windhuk
- Operator: Deutsche Ost-Afrika Linie
- Port of registry: Bremen
- Builder: Blohm+Voss, Hamburg
- Yard number: 507
- Completed: 1936
- Identification: call sign DJTH
- Fate: Interned in Brazil August 1942

United States
- Name: USS Lejeune (AP-74)
- Namesake: John Archer Lejeune
- Operator: United States Navy
- Acquired: 12 August 1942
- Commissioned: 12 May 1944
- Decommissioned: 9 February 1948
- Stricken: July 1957
- Fate: Scrapped, 1966

General characteristics
- Tonnage: 16,662 GRT
- Length: 578 ft (176.2 m) overall; 547.8 ft (167.0 m) registered
- Beam: 72.5 ft (22.1 m)
- Draft: 26 ft (7.9 m)
- Depth: 31.5 ft (9.6 m)
- Decks: 3
- Installed power: 14,000 SHP
- Propulsion: twin screw; 6 team turbines (1936–42); diesel engines (1942–66)
- Speed: 18 knots (33 km/h)
- Troops: 4,650
- Complement: 501
- Armament: 1 × 5"/38 caliber dual purpose gun; 4 × 3"/50 caliber dp guns; 8 × 40mm guns; 13 × 20mm guns

USS Lejeune (AP-74) was a German cargo liner that was converted to a United States Navy troop transport during the Second World War. Her original name was Windhuk.

== Civilian liner ==
Windhuk was built at the Blohm+Voss shipyard in Hamburg, Germany and completed in 1937. She was one of a pair of sister ships completed that year for Deutsche Ost-Afrika Linie (DOAL), the other being Pretoria.

In peacetime DOAL operated Windhuk mainly between Hamburg, South-West Africa and South Africa. Reports that she operated as a German raider in the Second World War are said to be false. (Her sister ship, Pretoria, later served as a German hospital ship during the closing stages of the War.)

== Onset of WW2 ==
After the outbreak of the Second World War in September 1939, the Windhuk risked being trapped in Cape Town and sought a means for passage back to Germany. The first leg of her northbound voyage would take her to Lobito, Angola, from there to Buenos Aires as a preferred destination. However this was not possible due to the actions of the pocket battleship Graf Spee. Instead after two months at sea, evading the Royal Navy, the Windhuk set course for Santos, São Paulo, Brazil. To enter the port on 7 December 1939 the crew had renamed the vessel the Santos Maru, repainting the ship at sea and flew a hand-crafted Japanese flag. Once dockside the German flag was raised and the borrowed name painted out.

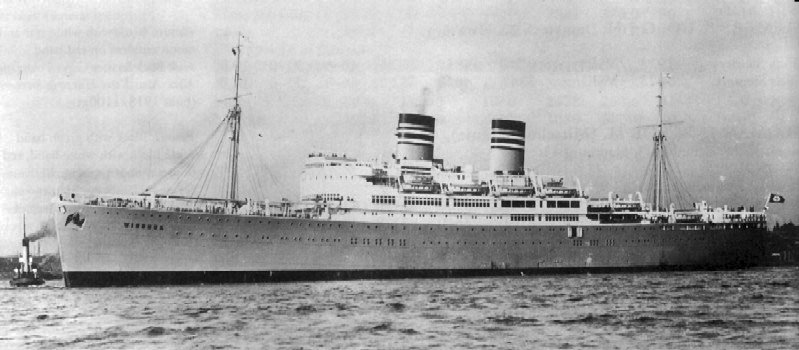

== Internment in Brazil ==
The Associated Press reported that on 15 January 1942 the German consul at Santos, Brazil, turned over the Windhuk to the Brazilian government.

Windhuk was still in Santos on 22 August 1942 when Brazil broke ties with Germany and interned the ship. When her crew learned that she was to be interned, they sabotaged most of her machinery. They poured concrete into the main turbine engines. They drained the boilers of water and then lit the furnaces, which melted the boilers beyond repair. They cut her main shafts and bearings with high temperature metal cutting torches. They damaged all electric generators, refrigeration equipment, steering gear, small motors, etc. beyond repair. However, they made no attempt to scuttle the ship.

Windhuk remained in Santos until January 1943 when she was towed to Rio de Janeiro for repairs.

In 1942 the US Government bought Windhuk from Brazil and sent 200 US Navy personnel to Brazil to fit her with new diesel engines. The work was not completed until March 1943, when she made a thirty-day voyage to Norfolk, Virginia for further work and conversion to a troopship.

When she arrived in Norfolk, she had been stripped of most of her elegant furnishings such as mahogany and teak wood paneling. She was refitted as a troop transport, which took about a year to rectify all the sabotage by the German crew. While at Norfolk she was named USS Lejeune (AP-74), after USMC General John Archer Lejeune.

== Transatlantic troop ship ==
Lejeune was fully commissioned in April or May 1944. On 11 June 1944, she began her wartime service in her new role as a US Navy troop transport with a voyage from Norfolk to Glasgow, Scotland, with 4,460 soldiers aboard. Her troop capacity would later be increased to 4,650. Beginning on 12 July, she then made a trip from New York to Glasgow, with 207 officers and 4,307 Navy personnel. In December, she made an Atlantic crossing with elements of the 69th Infantry Division, which was destined to meet Soviet troops on the banks of the Elbe River deep within Germany five months later, in April 1945.

Lejeune made a total of ten round-trip transatlantic crossings before the end of the war, and a further nine crossings were made to the United Kingdom, France or Africa in the months immediately after, until she returned to Norfolk 9 May 1946 for overhaul.

== Postwar troop service ==
On 28 September 1946 Lejeune resumed service. From 19 October 1946 to 1 August 1947, she made a total of four trips to the Pacific, from San Francisco to Shanghai and Qingdao, China, and to Yokosuka, Japan. She then sailed back to New York City, reaching her destination 29 August, and from there returned to San Francisco 25 September.

== Decommissioning ==
USS Lejeune departed San Francisco for Bremerton, Washington on 2 October 1947, where she was decommissioned 9 February 1948 and placed in the Pacific Reserve Fleet at Tacoma, Washington. She was struck from the Naval Vessel Register in July 1957 and scrapped at Portland, Oregon 16 August 1966. Her ship's bell however was preserved, and in 1971 it was mounted on the flagstaff at Marine Base HQ Camp Lejeune.

During her US Navy career Lejeune transported more than 100,000 troops.

== German former crew ==
During internment in Brazil, the crew was interned (in stables converted into internment camps) in small towns far inland. They were used as a workforce, and during times off were able to play soccer and perform musical presentations.

Many married Brazilian women and decided to stay in Brazil, which has had a significant German minority since early in the 19th century. After the war, some of the remaining crew members, especially older ones, returned to Germany. One group of former crew who stayed in Brazil after the war opened a restaurant in São Paulo named after the ship, serving dishes from her former passenger menus.

== Sources ==
- Harnack, Edwin P (1938) [1903]. All About Ships & Shipping (7th ed.). London: Faber and Faber. p. 462.
- Talbot-Booth, E.C. (1942) [1936]. Ships and the Sea (Seventh ed.). London: Sampson Low, Marston & Co. Ltd. p. 420.
