= Franziska Tausig =

Austrian author

Franziska Tausig (c. 1895 – 1989) was an Austrian author. Her parents were deported to Theresienstadt and murdered in Treblinka.

She gave birth to her son, Otto Tausig, in 1922 in Vienna. He later became an actor and director. In 1938, the persecution of Jews was heightening in Nazi-dominated Austria. She sent her son, Otto (then 16), to England through an advertisement in The Times calling for workers, thus saving him. In 1938, she acquired two tickets for the Usaramo, a ship that was supposed to be scrapped in Japan, which transported Jews to Shanghai on the way. She emigrated to Shanghai with her husband, who died there of tuberculosis shortly thereafter. Ten years later, in 1948, Tausig was reunited with her son in Vienna.

In 1987, she published her memoirs with the title Shanghai Passage: Flucht und Exil einer Wienerin (escape and exile of a Viennese). In this book she describes her desperate escape from Austria.

== See also ==
- List of Austrian writers
