= Tosari =

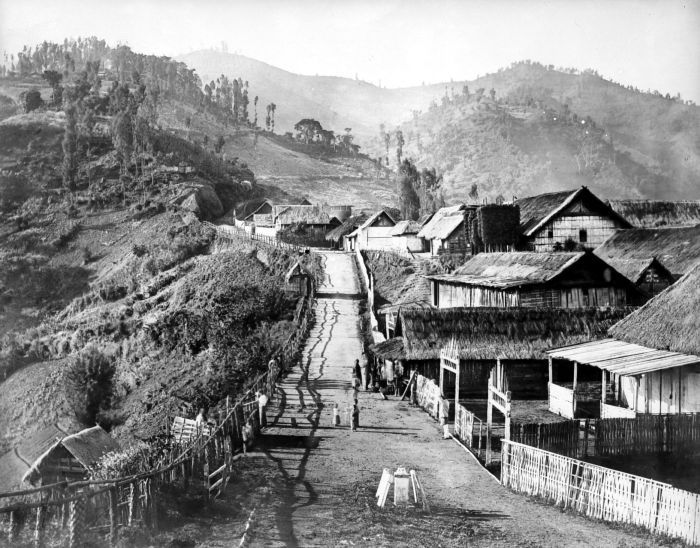
Tosari in the early 20th century

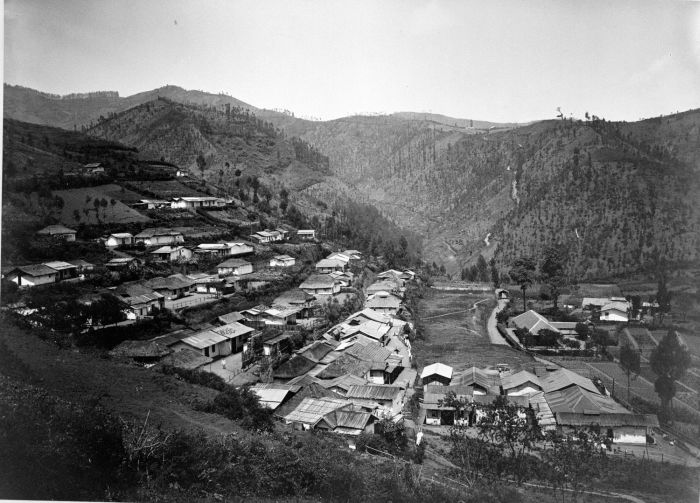
Tosari circa 1920-1940

Tosari (Indonesian pronunciation: [t̪oˈsari]) is a village in the Tengger Mountains of East Java, Indonesia. It is in Pasuruan Regency and is on a route to nearby Mount Bromo. The Tosari Sanitorium was advertised in a 1919 brochure.

== Gallery ==
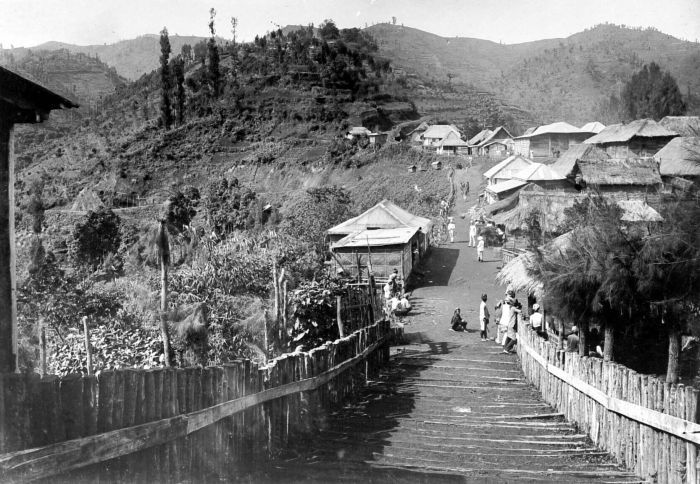
Sanatorium in Tosari, late 19th century

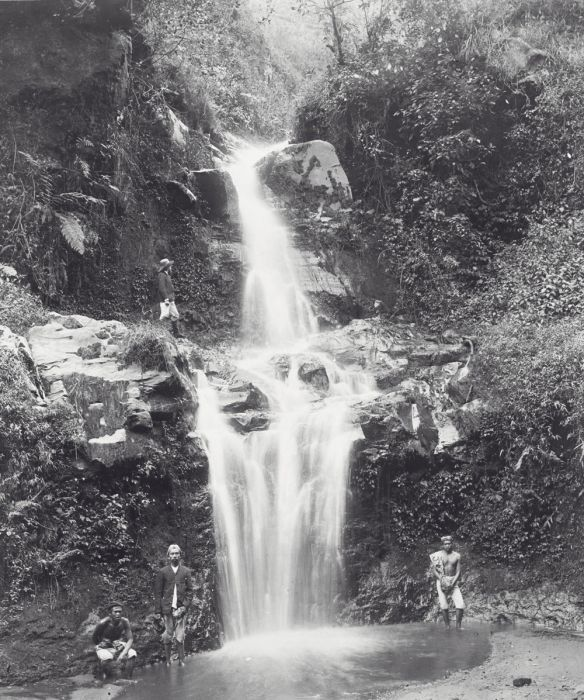
"Nimfenbad" waterfall in Tosari

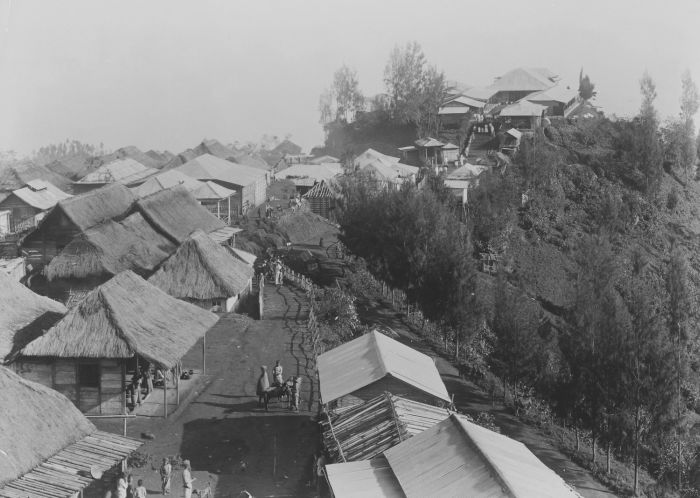

== See also ==
- Bromo Tengger Semeru National Park
