= SS Jagiełło =

German-built passenger cargo ship

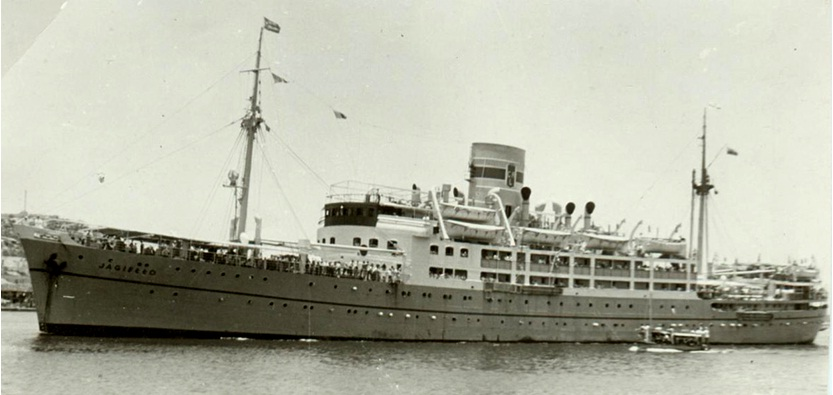
- Jagiełło arriving in Havana in 1948

History
- Name: 1939: Doğu; 1939: Lüderitzbucht; 1945: Duala; 1945: Empire Ock; 1946: Pyotr Velikiy; 1948: Jagiełło; 1949: Pyotr Velikiy
- Namesake: 1939: Turkish for "East"; 1939: Lüderitz Bay; 1945: Douala; 1945: River Ock; 1946: Peter the Great; 1948: Władysław II Jagiełło
- Owner: 1939: German Government; 1945: Ministry of War Transport; 1946: Ministry of the Maritime Fleet; 1947: Gdynia America Line; 1949: Black Sea Shipping Company
- Operator: as owners, except: 1939: Deutsche-Afrika Linien; 1940: Kriegsmarine; 1945: City Line Ltd; 1947: Cosulich Line
- Port of registry: 1939: (Nazi Germany) Hamburg, Germany; 1945: (United Kingdom) London, UK; 1946: (Soviet Union) Leningrad, USSR; 1947: Gdynia, Poland; 1949: (Soviet Union) Odessa, USSR
- Route: 1948: Genoa – Colón
- Builder: Blohm+Voss, Hamburg
- Yard number: 520
- Launched: 15 March 1939
- Completed: 31 August 1939
- Refit: 1948; 1953
- Identification: 1945: UK official number 180588; 1945: call sign GJZR; 1947: call sign SPEN; 1949: USSR register number M-2381; 1949: call sign UVSA; 1969: IMO number: 5276185
- Fate: Scrapped 1973

General characteristics
- Type: cargo liner
- Tonnage: 6,133 GRT, 3,139 NRT
- Length: 399 ft 7 in (121.79 m) overall; 384.8 ft (117.3 m)
- Beam: 52.7 ft (16.1 m)
- Depth: 28.0 ft (8.5 m)
- Decks: 2
- Installed power: 2 × triple-expansion engines; 2 × exhaust steam turbines
- Propulsion: 2 × screws
- Speed: 15 knots (28 km/h)
- Sensors & processing systems: wireless direction finding; echo sounding device; gyrocompass; submarine signalling
- Notes: sister ships: Egemen, Savaş

SS Jagiełło was a passenger and cargo steamship. She was launched in Germany in 1939 as Doğu for Turkish owners, but taken over by the German government and renamed Lüderitzbucht. Toward the end of the Second World War she was renamed Duala. At the end of the war, the United Kingdom seized her and renamed her Empire Ock. In 1946 she was transferred as war reparations to the USSR, who renamed her Pyotr Velikiy. In 1947 she was transferred to Poland, who renamed her Jagiełło. For a year Cosulich Line ran Jagiełło on a route between Genoa, Italy and Colón, Panama. In 1949 she returned to Soviet ownership, and her name reverted to Pyotr Velikiy. She was scrapped in Spain at the end of 1973.

== Building ==
In 1939, Blohm+Voss in Hamburg was building three sister ships for the Turkish government DenizBank and Denizyollari Idaresi. Yard number 520 was launched on 15 March as Doğu; which is Turkish for "East"; and completed on 31 August. Yard number 521 was to have been called Egemen (Turkish for "Sovereign"), and yard number 522 was to have been called Savaş ("War").

Doğu's lengths were 399 ft 7 in (121.79 m) overall and 384.8 ft (117.3 m) registered. Her beam was 52.7 ft (16.1 m), and her depth was 28.0 ft (8.5 m). Her tonnages were 6,133 GRT and 3,139 NRT. She had a slightly flared bow, and a cruiser stern. She had twin screws, and her main propulsion was by a pair of three-cylinder triple-expansion engines, built by Blohm+Voss. She also had a pair of Bauer-Wach exhaust steam turbines, which drove the same propeller shafts, but via double-reduction gearing and a Föttinger fluid coupling. She was capable of 15 knots (28 km/h). She was equipped with wireless direction finding; echo sounding device; gyrocompass; and submarine signalling.

== Second World War ==
On 1 September 1939, the day after Doğu was completed, Germany invaded Poland. The German government halted the delivery of Doğu and her two sisters. Doğu was renamed Lüderitzbucht, after Lüderitz Bay in South West Africa; she was registered in Hamburg; and Deutsche-Afrika Linien became her managers. In 1940 she was transferred to the Kriegsmarine, who used her as a barracks ship.

In March 1940, the German government told the Turkish government that it would allow delivery of the three ships on two conditions. Firstly, Turkey would have to confine the ships to short-sea shipping, along the Turkish coast and within the Black Sea, until the end of the war. Secondly, Turkey would have to supply Germany with at least 110,000 tons of chromium. Agreement was not reached, and the three ships remained in German ownership. Early in 1945 the ship was renamed Duala, probably after Douala in Cameroun.

== Post-war career ==
After Germany's unconditional surrender in 1945, UK forces seized Duala at Flensburg. She became the property of the UK Ministry of War Transport, who renamed her Empire Ock after the River Ock, a tributary of the River Thames. She was registered in London; her UK official number was 180588; her call sign was GJZR; and City Line were her managers.

In 1946, Empire Ock was transferred to the Soviet Ministry of the Maritime Fleet, who renamed her Пётр Великий ("Pyotr Velikiy"), after Tsar Peter the Great, and registered her in Leningrad (now St Petersburg). The name has been romanised with different spellings. Lloyd's Register used Peotr Veliki in 1946; but was using Petr Veliki by 1951. Other renditions include Petr Velikiy and Petr Veliky.

In 1947 the USSR transferred the ship to Poland, where the Gdynia America Line became her owners, and she was renamed Jagiełło, after King Władysław II Jagiełło. She was registered in Gdynia, and her call sign was SPEN. She never visited Gdynia. She spent a year being refitted in Genoa, and then in 1948 entered service under Cosulich Line management; and with a mostly Italian crew; and just a few Polish officers and specialists. Her route was between Genoa and Colón, Panama, via ports of call including Lisbon and Havana.

Pyotr Velikiy in Odessa in 1964
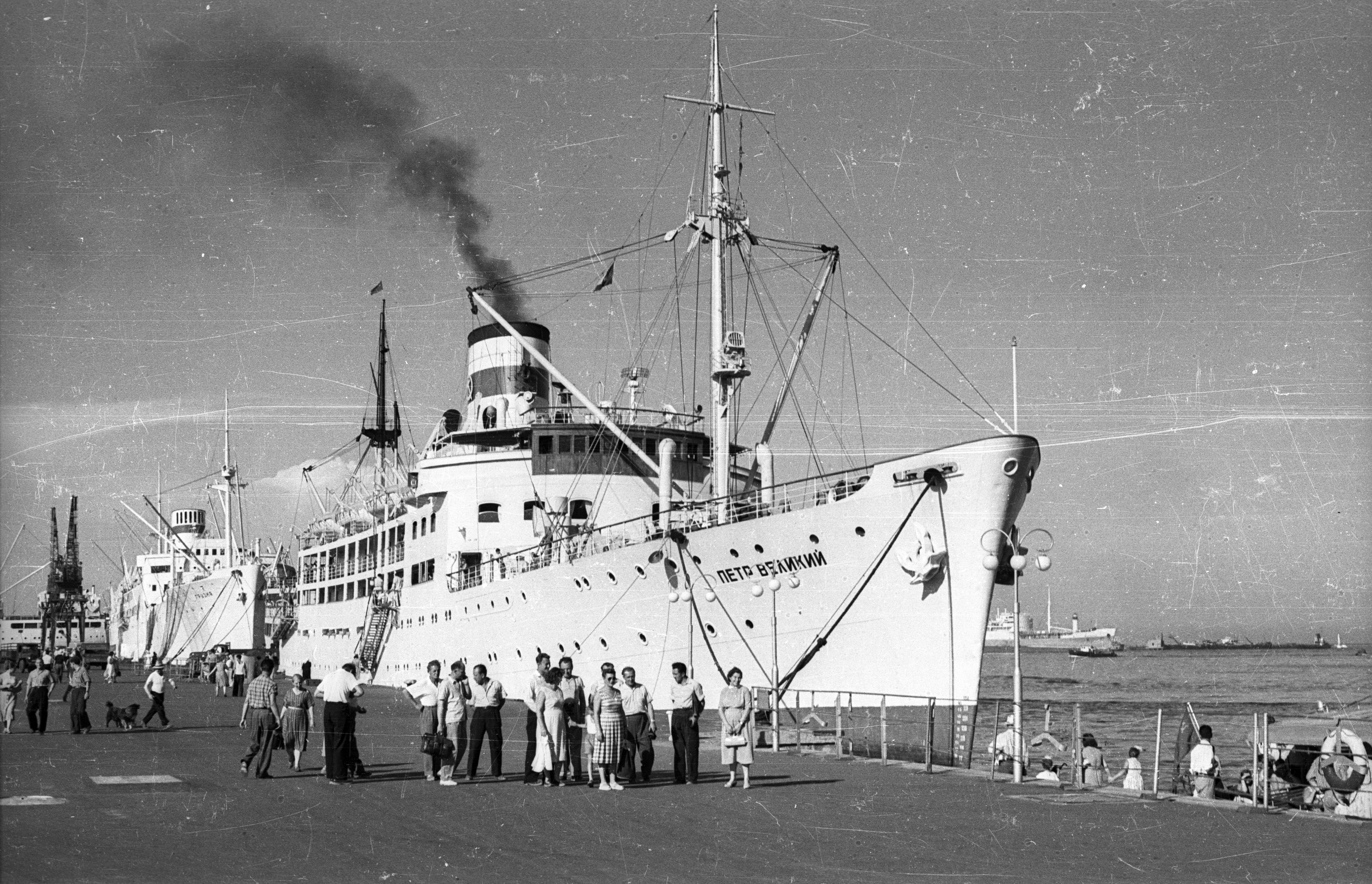
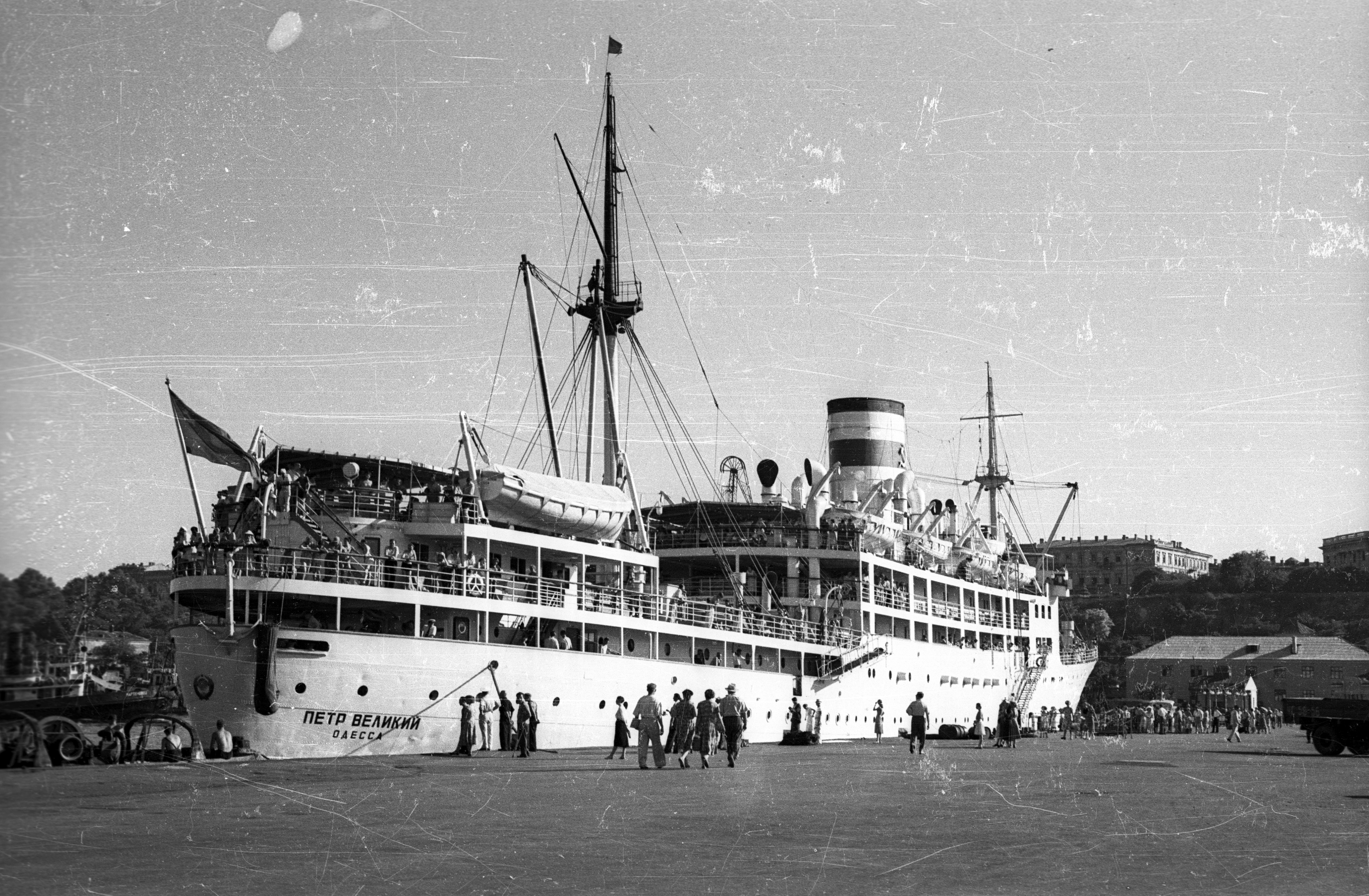

The service was a commercial failure, so in 1949 Poland returned Jagiełło to the USSR, who reverted her name to Pyotr Velikiy. She was registered in Odessa; her call sign was UVSA; and her Soviet register number was M-2381. She joined the fleet of the Black Sea Shipping Company, who used her on passenger routes, mainly between Odessa; Sochi; and Batumi. She operated along with the passenger ship Gruziya, which had been the Polish Sobieski. In 1953 she was refitted in Odessa. In 1969 Lloyd's Register introduced seven-figure registration numbers, and Pyotr Velikiy was numbered 5276185.

On 20 November 1973, Pyotr Velikiy arrived in Castellón de la Plana, Spain, to be broken up by M Varela Davalillo.

== Bibliography ==
- Lloyd's Register of Shipping. Vol. II.–Steamers and Motorships of 300 Tons. Trawlers, Tugs, Dredgers, Etc. London: Lloyd's Register of Shipping. 1939 – via Southampton City Council.
- Lloyd's Register of Shipping. Vol. I.–Steamers and Motorships of 300 Tons Gross and Over. London: Lloyd's Register of Shipping. 1945 – via Southampton City Council.
- Lloyd's Register of Shipping. Vol. I.–Steamers and Motorships of 300 Tons Gross and Over. London: Lloyd's Register of Shipping. 1946 – via Internet Archive.
- Lloyd's Register of Shipping. Vol. Steamers and Motorships of 300 Tons Gross and Over. London: Lloyd's Register of Shipping. 1947 – via Internet Archive.
- Mitchell, WH; Sawyer, LA (1990). The Empire Ships: a record of British-built and acquired merchant ships during the Second World War (2nd ed.). London: Lloyd's of London Press. ISBN 1-85044-275-4.
- Piwowoński, Jan (1989). Flota spod Biało-Czerwonej [Fleet from under White and Red] (in Polish) (Wyd. 1 ed.). Nasza Księgarnia. ISBN 978-83-100-8902-1.
- Register Book. Vol. II. M–Z. London: Lloyd's Register of Shipping. 1951 – via Internet Archive.
- Register Book. Vol. I. Register of Ships. London: Lloyd's Register of Shipping. 1956 – via Internet Archive.
- Sweet, Paul R; Lambert, Margaret; Beaumont, Maurice, eds. (1956). Documents on German Foreign Policy 1918–1945. D (1937–1945). Vol. IX The War Years: March 18–June 22, 1940. Washington, DC: United States Government Publishing Office – via Google Books.
- Wilson, Edward A (1978). Soviet passenger ships, 1917–1977. Kendal: World Ship Society. ISBN 0-905617-04-5.
