= Deutsche Afrika-Linien/John T. Essberger Group of Companies =

German shipping company

- Industry: Shipping
- Founded: 1924
- Founder: John Theodor Essberger
- Headquarters: Hamburg, Germany
- Area served: Worldwide
- Number of employees: 1200–1300

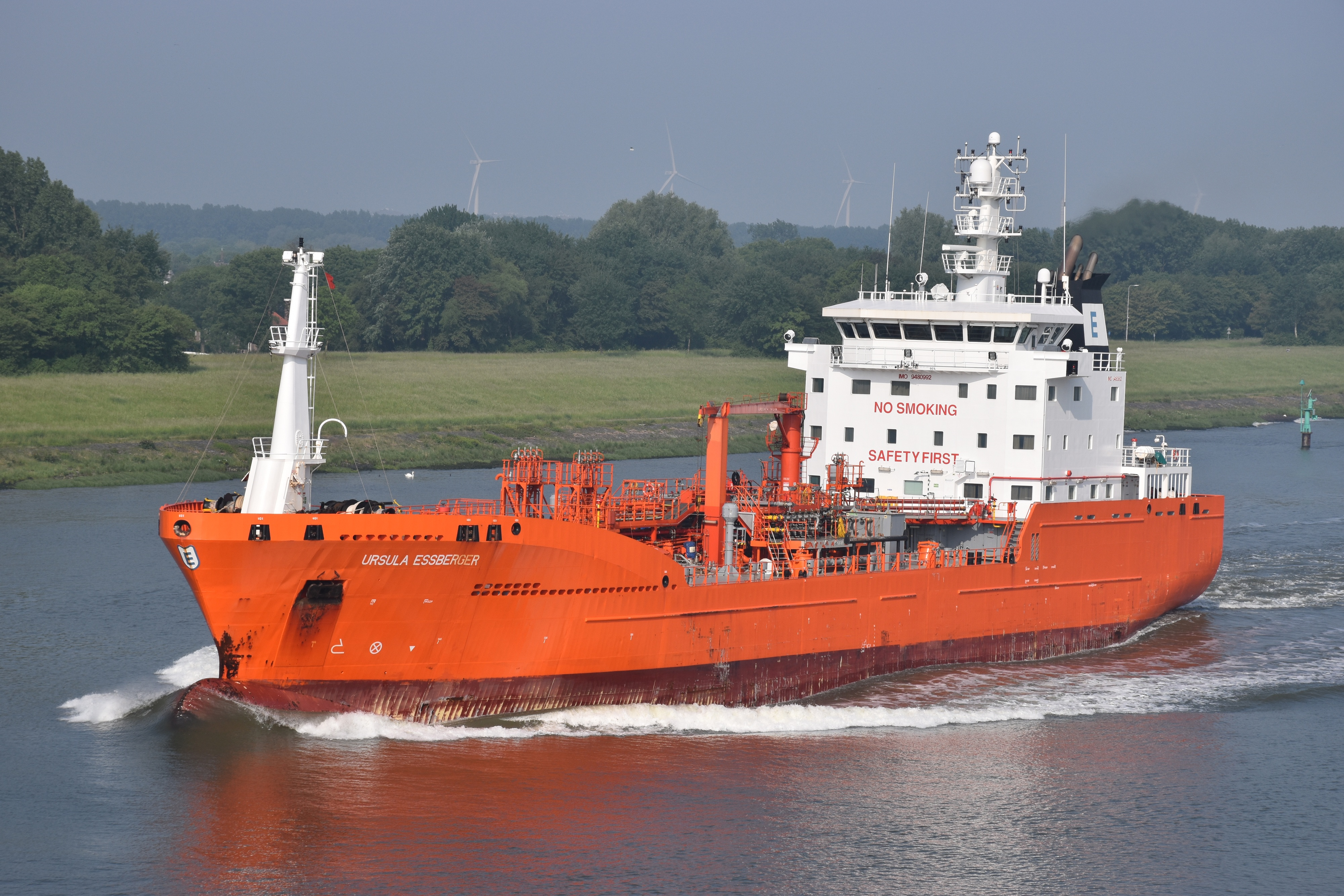
Chemical tanker Ursula Essberger

The Deutsche Afrika-Linien GmbH & Co./ John T. Essberger GmbH & Co. (DAL/JTE) is a German shipping company, based in Hamburg. It has a workforce of 1200–1300 world-wide and an annual turnover of about $350 million. The headquarters of Palmaille in Hamburg-Altona is situated on the Elbe River and consists of an 18th-century palace and several modern buildings. The company operates container and general cargo services between Europe, the Canary Islands, eastern and southern Africa, and Indian Ocean ports. Gas and chemical tankers are operated under the name Essberger Tankers. In addition, the group offers logistics and insurance services, as well as the travel agency 'Hammonia Travel'.

It was founded in Hamburg in 1924 as the Essberger-Tankschiffreederei, by the John Theodor Essberger (1886–1959). Essberger was British-born but had become a naturalised German citizen before 1914. He commanded torpedo-boats during the First World War and was named 'Leader of German shipping' during the Third Reich. In 1942 Essberger took over the Woermann-Linie and Deutsche Ost-Afrika Linie from the cigarette manufacturer Philipp Fürchtegott Reemtsma. After the war, the fleet was dispossessed. However, Essberger soon built up a new fleet and became once again one of the largest private shipowners in West Germany.

After Essberger's death in 1959, the company was taken over by his daughter, Liselotte von Rantzau-Essberger (1918–1993). Just before the oil crisis of 1973, the company placed an order for two new large tankers. The new ships were launched in 1975 at Geltinger Bay and later sold at a considerable loss. In the 1980s, Liselotte's sons Dr. Eberhart von Rantzau and Heinrich von Rantzau took charge of the company. Following a close partnership with Safmarine for many decades, Deutsche Afrika-Linien and Safmarine decided to form a long-term alliance called the Safmarine / DAL Joint Venture (SAFDAL) in 1997 to represent their commercial interests in the Southern Africa Europe Container Service (SAECS). Since then, the business has expanded slowly, but steadily and has expanded into chemical tanker transport. Today, the fleet of DAL/John T. Essberger has 34 dry cargo ships and tankers.
