= TS Pretoria =

Passenger ship (1936–1987)

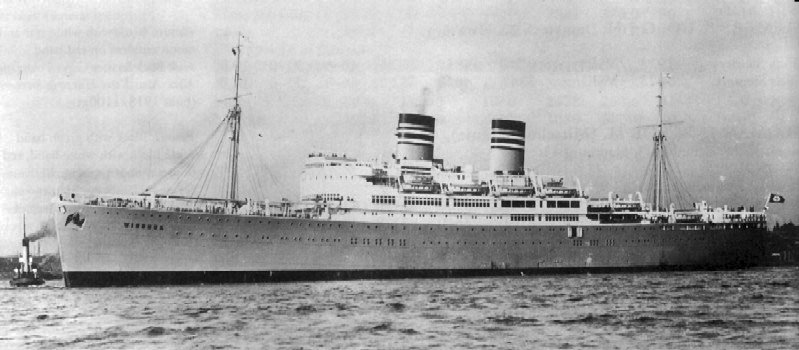

History
- Name: Pretoria (1936–45); Empire Doon (1945–49); Empire Orwell (1949–59); Gunung Djati (1959–80); KRI Tanjung Pandan (1980–84)
- Namesake: Pretoria, South Africa (1936–45); River Orwell (1949–59); Sunan Gunungjati, a 16th-century Javanese Wali Sanga (1959–80); Tanjung Pandan, Bangka Belitung Islands, Indonesia (1980-1984)
- Owner: Deutsche Ost-Afrika Linie (1936–39); Kriegsmarine (1939–45); Ministry of War Transport (1945); Ministry of Transport (1945–59); Alfred Holt & Co (1959–62); Indonesian Government (1962–64); P.T. Maskapai Pelajaran "Sang Saka" (1964–65); Perusahaan Pelajaran Arafat (1965–79); Indonesian Navy (1979–84)
- Operator: Deutsche Ost-Afrika Linie (1936–39); Kriegsmarine (1939–45); Orient Steam Navigation Company (1945–59), Ocean Steam Ship Co (1959–62); Pan-Islamic Steam Ship Co (1962–79); Indonesian Navy (1979–84)
- Port of registry: (Nazi Germany) Bremen (1936–39); (Nazi Germany) Kriegsmarine (1939–45); (United Kingdom) London (1945–62); Indonesia (1962–80); (Indonesia) Indonesian Navy (1980–84)
- Builder: Blohm+Voss, Hamburg, Germany
- Yard number: 506
- Launched: 16 July 1936
- Completed: 1936
- Maiden voyage: 19 December 1936
- Out of service: 1984
- Refit: 1945 (as troop ship); 1950 (as troop ship); 1958–59 (as pilgrim ship); 1975 (as pilgrim ship)
- Identification: call sign DJSG (1936–45); Pennant Number 971 (1980–84); IMO number: 5138395
- Captured: as prize ship in May 1945
- Fate: Scrapped in 1987

General characteristics
- Type: Ocean liner (1936–39); Depot ship (1939–40); Hospital ship (1940–45); Troop ship (1945–58); Pilgrim ship (1958–80); Troop ship (1980–81); Naval accommodation ship (1981–84)
- Tonnage: 16,662 GRT (1936–58); 17,891 GRT (1959–87)
- Length: 547.8 ft (167.0 m)
- Beam: 72.5 ft (22.1 m)
- Draught: 26 ft (7.9 m)
- Depth: 31.5 ft (9.6 m)
- Decks: 3
- Installed power: 14,000 SHP
- Propulsion: twin screw; 6 steam turbines (1936–73); Diesel engines (1973–84)
- Speed: 18 knots (33 km/h)
- Capacity: 152 1st class and 338 tourist class passengers (1936–39); 2,500 patients (1945); 1,491 troops (1950–58); 106 1st class and 2,000 pilgrim class passengers (1959–75)
- Complement: 300 (1936–39); 260 (1945)

TS Pretoria was a ship that had a long and varied career as first a German cargo liner, then a U-boat depot ship, hospital ship, British troop ship, Muslim pilgrim ship and finally an Indonesian naval accommodation ship.

== Description ==
The ship's registered length was 547 ft (166.7 m) long, her beam was 72.5 ft (22.1 m), her depth was 31.5 ft (9.6 m), and her draught was 26 ft (7.9 m). As built, she was assessed at 16,662 GRT. After her 1958 refit, she was assessed as 17,891 GRT.

As built, the ship was powered by six steam turbines, rated at a total of 14,000 shp. These were fed by a number of small, high-pressure Benson boilers. The turbines drove twin screws and gave her a speed of 18 knots (33 km/h). In 1949 the Benson boilers were replaced by convention boilers, made by Foster Wheeler, operating at 500 pounds per square inch (34 bar). In 1973, she was re-engined, being fitted with diesel engines.

As built, the ship had berths for 152 first class and 338 second class passengers. In 1949 she was converted to a troopship, with berths for 1,491 troops. In 1959 she was refitted to carry 106 first class and 2,000 pilgrim class passengers.

== History ==
=== Pre-war ===
Pretoria was built as yard number 506 by Blohm & Voss, Hamburg, Germany. She was launched on 16 July 1936. She was one of a pair of sister ships completed that year for Deutsche Ost-Afrika Linie, the other being TS Windhuk. Her call sign was DJSG.

Pretoria began her maiden voyage from Hamburg on 19 December 1936. Her destination was Lourenço Marques, Mozambique via Southampton, United Kingdom; Lisbon, Portugal; Casablanca, Morocco; Cape Town, South Africa. On 24 December, having departed from Southampton with 470 passengers and 300 crew on board, she ran aground on the East Lepe Bank in the Solent. Although five tugs attempted to free her, she remained aground. After 900 tons of water had been discharged overboard and 400 tons of fuel oil had been transferred to a tanker, she was freed with the aid of seven tugs on 26 December, losing her port anchor in the process. Pretoria returned to Southampton for inspection, resuming her voyage the next day. As a result of the delays incurred, the calls at Lisbon and Casablanca were omitted. Deutsche Ost-Afrika Linie operated her mainly between Hamburg, South West Africa and South Africa.

On 20 May 1937, Pretoria was involved in a collision with the British tanker Hekla during foggy weather in the North Sea (53°29′N 4°49′E). Hekla was badly damaged amidships and jettisoned some of her cargo. Pretoria stood by whilst tugs were sent from Bremen, Germany to Hekla's aid.

=== World War II ===
In November 1939, Pretoria was requisitioned by the Kriegsmarine and used as a U-boat depot ship. Initially based at Kiel, Schleswig-Holstein, she served the 1st U-boat Flotilla, based at Neustadt, Hamburg, from January 1940. In December she was transferred to 21st U-boat Flotilla, based at Pillau, East Prussia. In 1945, she was converted to a hospital ship. Pretoria assisted in the evacuation of German civilians from the Eastern Territories towards the end of the war. In May 1945 she was in Copenhagen when Denmark was liberated, and UK forces captured her as a prize of war.

== Post-war merchant service ==
Pretoria was passed to the Ministry of War Transport (MoWT) converted to a troop ship at Newcastle upon Tyne. She was renamed Empire Doon. The MoWT placed her under the management of the Orient Steam Navigation Company. Empire Doon suffered boiler trouble in Port Said, Egypt, was towed back to Falmouth, Cornwall by the Admiralty tug Bustler. She was then laid up off Southend-on-Sea. Essex, Empire Doon was moved to Southampton, Hampshire in May 1947. In 1949, she was reboilered by J.I. Thorneycroft & Co of Southampton, and converted to a troopship, at a cost of £2,000,000. Trials were undertaken in November 1949, but had to be curtailed due to engine problems. Her maiden voyage as a troopship, scheduled for 10 December, was postponed. Sea trials resumed on 29 December.

The refit of Empire Doon was completed in January 1950 and she was renamed Empire Orwell to conform with the Ministry of Transport policy of ship names being prefixed "Empire" and Orient Line policy of using names beginning with "O". She had capacity for 1,491 troops in three classes. Empire Orwell departed on her maiden voyage as a troopship on 17 January 1950 bound for Tobruk, Libya and Port Said, Egypt. She served as a troopship in the 1956 Suez Crisis: landing troops in Cyprus and evacuating troops from the Suez Canal Zone.

In April 1958, Empire Orwell was damaged during storms in the Atlantic Ocean. She was towed into Lisbon, Portugal by a German tug. There were complaints about conditions on board Empire Orwell when she was returning troops from the Far East to the United Kingdom in 1958. The issue was raised in Parliament by Horace King, MP. In reply, Alfred Barnes, the Minister of Transport, stated that complaints about messing arrangements encountered in the early part of the voyage were swiftly resolved. Complaints that soldiers below the rank of sergeant were generally unable to visit their families were stated to be a matter of military discipline. Later that year, she was chartered to the Pan-Islamic Steam Ship Co of Karachi, Pakistan who used her to carry Muslim pilgrims. Alfred Holt & Co bought her in November of that year and renamed her Gunung Djati after the 16th century Javanese Wali Sanga Sunan Gunungjati. She was placed her under the management of Ocean Steam Ship Co, Liverpool, Lancashire. Gunung Djati was refitted by Barclay Curle & Co Ltd in Glasgow, Scotland. The refit increased her tonnage to 17,851 GRT. She was fitted with a mosque, and an indicator that would point towards Mecca. On 7 March 1959 she sailed for Djakarta, Indonesia. She could carry 106 first class passengers and 2,000 pilgrim class passengers.

In 1962 the Indonesian government bought Gunung Djati, transferred her to the Indonesian flag and continued to operate her as a pilgrim ship. In 1964 P.T. Maskapai Pelajaran "Sang Saka" of Djakarta bought her and continued to operate her in the same service. She was sold to Perusahaan Pelajaran Arafat, Djakarta. In 1973 her boilers and steam turbines were replaced with diesel engines and in 1975 she was refitted in Hong Kong.

=== Indonesian naval service ===
In 1979, the Indonesian Government bought Gunung Djati back, renamed her KRI Tanjung Pandan, with the pennant number 971. She was used by the Indonesian Navy as a troopship until 1981, and then as an accommodation ship. She had ceased to serve in this role by 1984. Tanjung Pandan was sold in 1987 to Taiwan for scrapping.

=== Replacement naval ship ===
In 2003 Indonesia commissioned an amphibious transport dock ship from Daesun Shipbuilding and Engineering of Pusan in Korea, which entered service as KRI Tanjung Dalpele. She has since been converted to a hospital ship and renamed KRI Dr Soeharso (990).
