= Deutsche Ost-Afrika Linie =

Shipping company

- Industry: Shipping, transportation
- Founded: 1890; 136 years ago
- Defunct: 1934
- Headquarters: Altstadt
- Area served: East Africa, Indian Ocean
- Parent: Woermann-Linie

Deutsche Ost-Afrika Linie (German East Africa Line, or DOAL) was a shipping line, established in 1890 as an alternative to the existing shipping services to East Africa, including German East Africa (1891–1919), then dominated by United Kingdom shipping lines.

== Founding ==
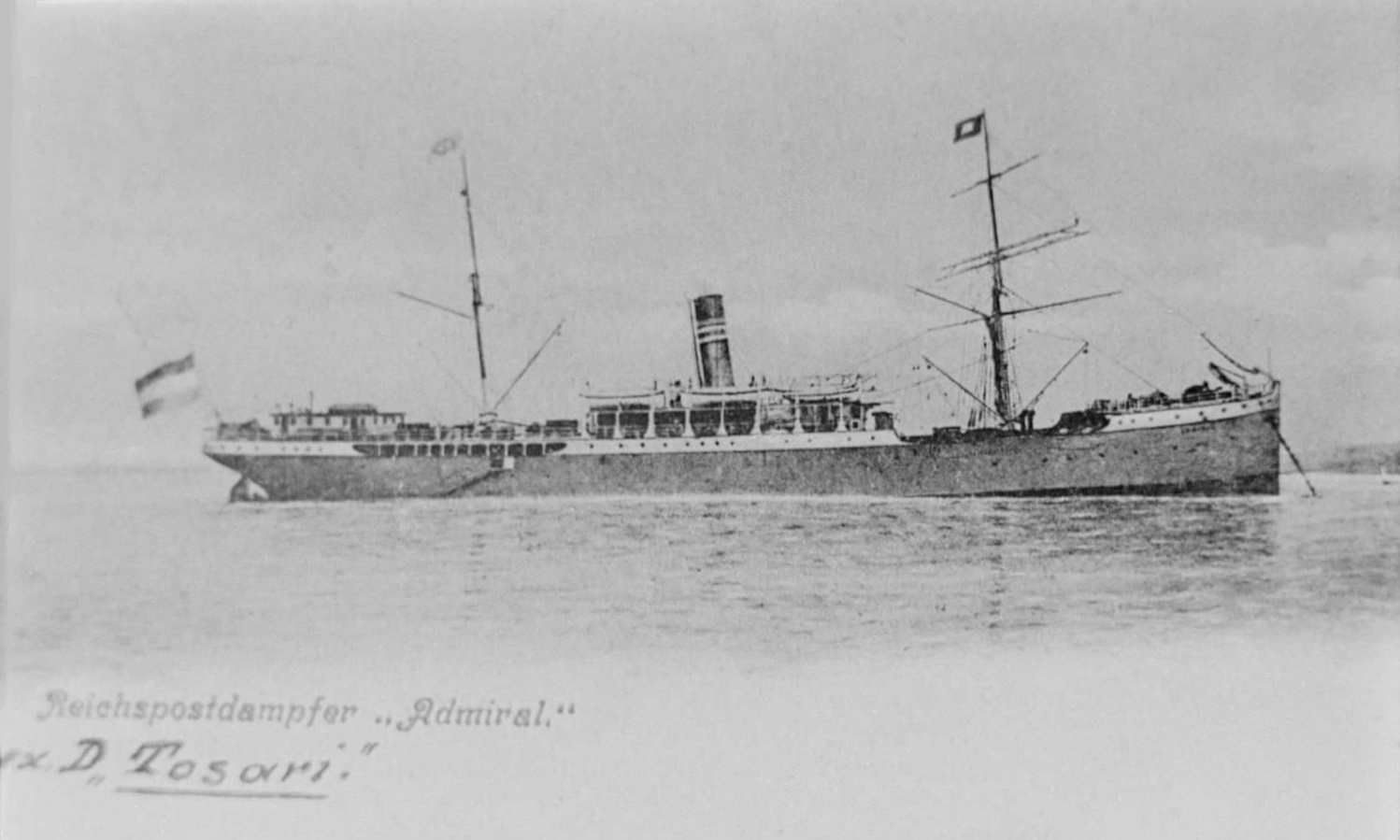
The first Admiral, acquired second-hand in 1891

In 1888, the board of the trading firm Woermann-Linie made plans to set up a scheduled service to East Africa as the existing routes were dominated by British lines. The following year the Reichstag approved such a shipping line and in January 1890 the Chancellor began looking for a German shipping company to set up a line to Africa subsidized for over ten years with 900,000 marks a year. As no company was ready, the Reich announced the establishment of a shipping company.

On 19 April 1890 DOAL was founded with a capital of six million marks by a consortium of German banks and the Hamburg merchants Adolph Woermann, F. Laeisz, August Bolten, and Hansen & Co. C. Woermann took over the management with Adolph Woermann as Chairman of the Supervisory Board. The line began operating on 23 July 1890 with two steamships bought from the Woermann line. Beginning in 1891, the service consisted of weekly departures from Hamburg via the Mediterranean to Bombay and Zanzibar.

== Early years ==
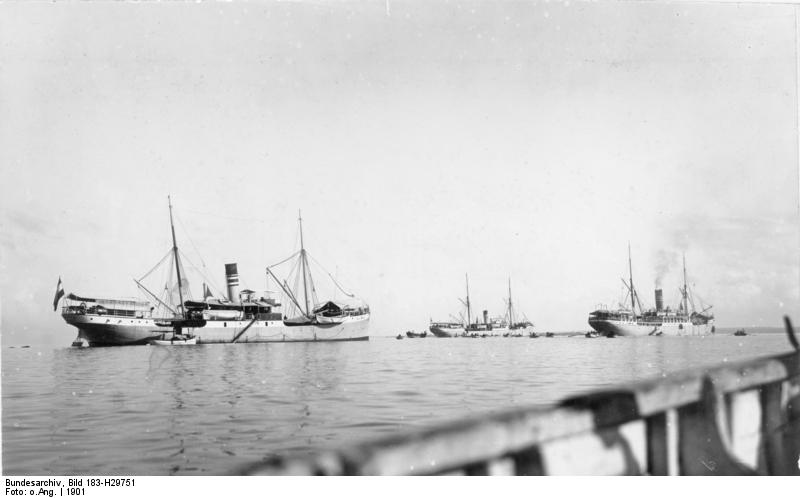
DOAL ships in port in Zanzibar, 1901

The first years of operation were difficult due to the British takeover of Zanzibar in November 1890 and the loss of two ships in the first three years. By 1894 the routes were extended to South Africa, and profits were posted for the first time. In 1900 the government contract with annual subsidies of 1.35 million marks was extended by 15 years and the share capital increased to ten million marks. In 1901, a bond for five million marks was issued to build more ships.

In 1894 the company added a route from Hamburg to Durban in South Africa via the Cape and commissioned for this service Herzog (1896, 4,933 GRT) and Koenig. In 1895 DOAL introduced instead the new steamships on the route Hamburg – Suez – Dar es Salaam, and from 1898 also Durban was connected via Suez, no longer via Cape Town, in order to avoid a clash with the British. Only from 1901, when the Boer War was no longer a political obstacle, a new 'Rund-um-Afrika' (round Africa) route was operated by DOAL on the circuit Hamburg – Bremerhaven – Cape Town – Suez – Hamburg and in reverse direction. For this main line the Kronprinz and Kurfürst were introduced, steamships with a grey hull, white superstructure and a buff funnel, topped with an arrangement of black/white/red rings, referring to the colours of the flag of the German Empire.

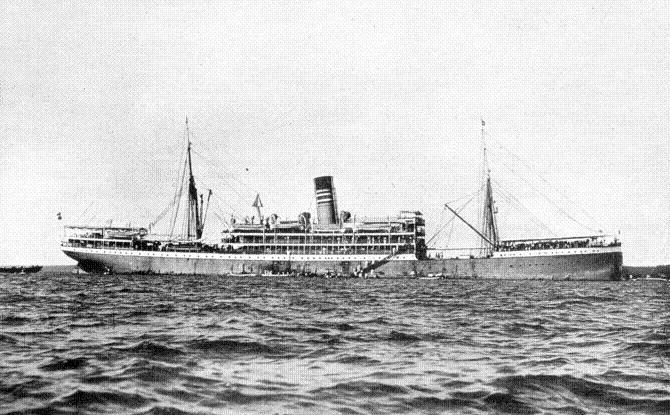
Kurfürst, sister ship of Kronprinz

More difficult years followed until 1907, as new competitors appeared and the British lines increased competition. DOAL and Woermann Line then responded to an offer by Albert Ballin to form a joint venture with Hamburg America Line (HAPAG). HAPAG and Woermann took part in the operation of DOAL, and each allocated one or two ships for an extension of the line from South Africa to West Africa. Woermann Line was involved in the shared service and in 1908 the Hamburg-Bremen Africa Line also joined. The increased number of departures improved business.

After the death of Adolph Woermann in 1911, Eduard Woermann succeeded him. In 1914 the company's fleet consisted of 22 steamships, totalling about 110,000 GRT.

== World War One and its aftermath ==
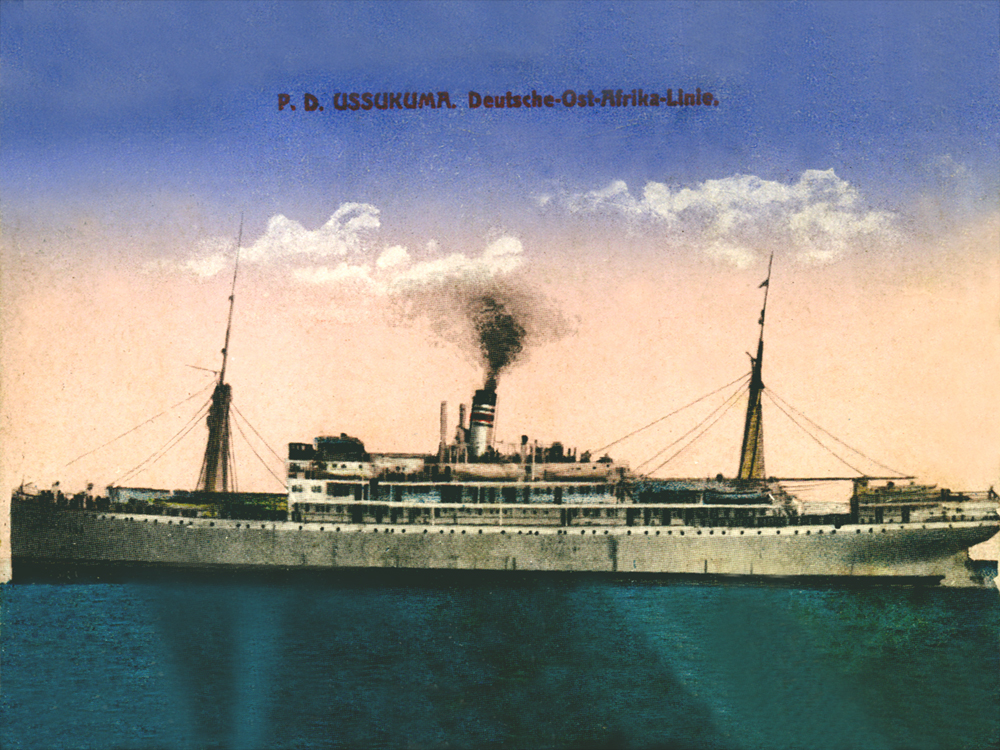
Ussukuma, launched in 1920

The subsidy contract of 1900, which expired in 1915, was not extended as a result of the war. In 1916 Woermann sold Woermann Line and DOAL to a consortium made up of HAPAG, Norddeutscher Lloyd (NDL) and Hugo Stinnes. The company lost all ships due to the First World War and the Versailles Treaty.

The Stinnes shares were taken over by HAPAG and NDL in 1921.

In 1927 the Deutschen Afrika-Dienst-Vertrag of 1907 was continued for a further 20 years and in the following years the corporate structure stabilised. In 1928 the 9,552 GRT Watussi and Ubena were introduced as the first two-funnel turbine steamships of the company under the DOAL name, employed on the Rund-um-Afrika route.

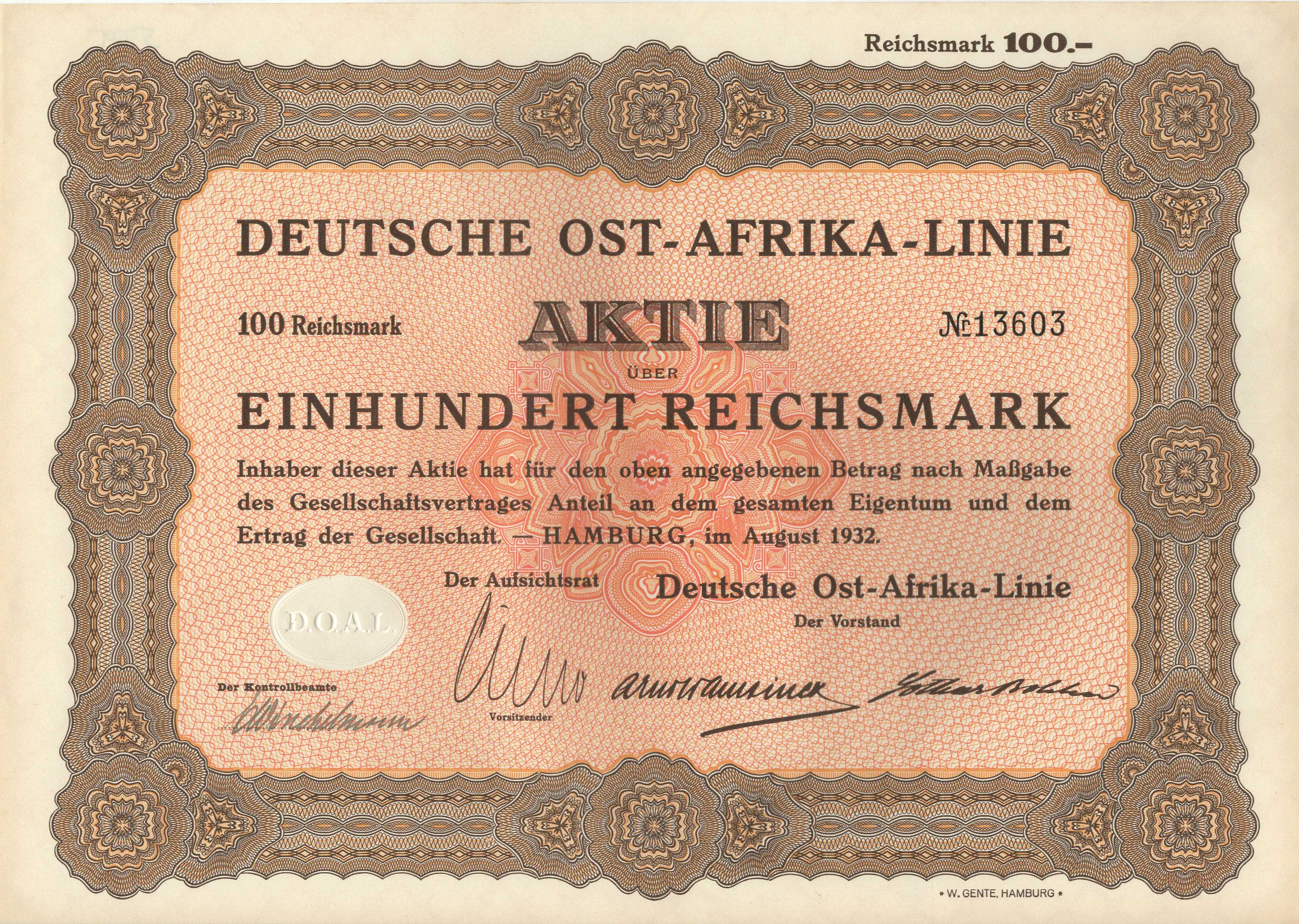
Deutsche Ost-Afrika-Linie share certificate, issued August 1932

A year after the Nazi Party was elected, German shipping was reorganized in 1934, in which the large shipping groups were divided. HAPAG and NDL had to surrender their shares in Woermann Line and DOAL to the German Reich. In 1936 two larger turbine steamships were launched: Pretoria and Windhuk, of 16,662 GRT each.

In 1942, during World War II, this line and the Woermann-Linie owned by the cigarette manufacturer Philipp Fürchtegott Reemtsma, were taken over by John T. Essberger of Germany. Deutsche Afrika-Linien lost both fleets in post-war reparations.

=== Ships of the Deutsche Ost-Afrika Linie up until 1914 ===
Name	Shipyard	GRT	Length [m]	Passengers	Launch/ Enter Service	Notes
Admiral	CS Swan & Hunter; Nr. 159	2,470	91.6		30.10.1890; 1891	Built as Tosari for Dampfschiffs Rhederei zu Hamburg. Bought by DOAL in 1891 and renamed Admiral. Sold 1902 and renamed Rosalind. Renamed City of Sydney in 1912. Wrecked 1914.
General	Sir WG Armstrong, Mitchell & Co; Nr. 566	2,361	91.5		06.09.1890; 1894	Built as Salatiga for Dampfschiffs Rhederei zu Hamburg. Bought by DOAL in 1894 and renamed General. Scrapped 1909.
Kronprinz	Blohm & Voss; Nr. 140	5,645	125.3	188	10.04.1900; 30.06.1900	Between-deck accommodation for 116 men. Interned in Lourenço Marques at the outbreak of war in 1914. Seized in 1916 by Portugal. Renamed Quelimane and used as a hospital ship from October 1916 until the end of 1917. Returned to passenger service for Companhia de Transportes do Estado until 1927 when it was scrapped
Kurfürst	Reiherstiegwerft; Nr. 407	5,654	125.2	270	9.07.1901; 13.10.1901	Whilst homebound ran aground on the Portuguese coast and sank on 6 May 1904
Bürgermeister	Flensburger SG; Nr. 210	5,945	125.3	250	27.02.1902; 19.06.1902	Passed in 1919 to France: renamed Macoris Broken up in 1935
Prinzregent	Blohm & Voss; Nr. 164	6,341	126.8	175	10.01.1903; 6.04.1903	Between-deck accommodation for 120 men. Passed in 1919 to France: renamed Cordoba Broken up in 1932
Feldmarschall	Reiherstiegwerft; Nr. 410	6,142	126.7	268	21.02.1903; 24.06.1903	Between-deck accommodation for 120 men. On 17 August 1915 came under fire from HMS Hyacinth and was damaged, repaired by the British and put into service as Field Marshall, in 1922 sold to China, sunk in 1947
Admiral	Blohm & Voss; Nr. 178	6,341	126.8	264	25.06.1905; 23.09.1905	Between-deck accommodation for 106 men. In 1914 the ship was in Lourenço Marques and sought protection. Seized in 1916 by Portugal; renamed Lourenço Marques; scrapped in 1950
Prinzessin	Blohm & Voss; Nr. 182	6,387	126.8	298	23.12.1905; 20.04.1906	Passed to Britain in 1919 then to France in 1921: Renamed General Voyron, scrapped in 1934
General	Blohm & Voss; Nr. 203	8,063	136.9	283	13.07.1910; 25.02.1911	Between-deck accommodation for 70 men. Undertook war service in Smyrna, Constantinople as an accommodation and sick-bay ship for the Turkish war effort. Seized in 1918 in Odessa by France; renamed Azay le Rideau. Scrapped in 1937
Tabora	Blohm & Voss; Nr. 211	8,022	136.9	316	18.04.1912; 29.06.1912	Renamed HS Tabora suspected of masquerading as hospital ship. Sunk by British ship HMS Vengeance in Dar es Salaam harbour on 23 March 1916,
Kigoma	Reiherstiegwerft; Nr. 451	8,156	137.0	310	30.01.1914; 28.04.1914	Passed to British in 1919 then to France in 1921: renamed Algeria, in 1922 was purchased by HAPAG, renamed Toledo, returned to Africa service in 1927, scrapped in 1934

=== Ships of the Deutsche Ost-Afrika Linie after 1914 ===
Name	Shipyard	GRT	Length [m]	Passengers	Launch/ Enter Service	Notes
Ussukuma	Blohm & Voss; Nr. 389	7,834	127.6	264	20.12.1920; 08.07.1921	At outbreak on WW2 was at Lourenço Marques. Commandeered by Abwehr, crossed Atlantic to Argentina. After engagement with HMS Ajax was scuttled by crew on 5 December 1939 off Necochea
Pretoria	Blohm & Voss; Nr. 506	16,662	175.8	490	1936	Kriegsmarine submarine tender from 1939 to 1945. Seized by the UK. Empire Doon until 1949, then Empire Orwell. Bought by Indonesia. Gunung Djati until 1980, then Tanjung Pandan. Scrapped 1984.
Windhuk	Blohm & Voss; Nr. 507	16,662	175.8	490	1936	In 1939 disguised as Santos Maru and entered Santos. Interned until 1942, when Brazil entered war with Allies, the crew sabotaged all the machinery. Repaired and served as USS Lejeune from 1943. Scrapped in Portland 1966

== See also ==
- Deutsche Afrika-Linien/John T. Essberger Group of Companies
- German East Africa topics
- East Africa Protectorate
- Kenya Colony
