= President Casino =

President Casino may refer to:

- President Casinos
  - President Casino Laclede's Landing
  - President Casino Broadwater Resort
