= President Casinos =

President Casinos was a gaming company and casino operator based in St. Louis, Missouri that was active in the 1990s. In the 2000s it went into bankruptcy and had liquidating by the end of the decade.

== History ==
The company was founded in 1991 by Pittsburgh millionaire John E. Connelly, who owned the Gateway Clipper Fleet and SS Admiral. Its riverboat casino The President in Davenport, Iowa, which opened in April 1991, was one of the first modern riverboat casinos in the Midwest and South after they started becoming legal. It began trading on NASDAQ in 1992.

On June 20, 2002, President Casinos filed for Chapter 11 bankruptcy. On April 15, 2005, the President Casino Broadwater Resort in Biloxi was sold to Broadwater Development.

On February 24, 2006, Pinnacle Entertainment announced that it would purchase the President Casino Laclede's Landing for $31.5 million. On December 21, 2006, Pinnacle Entertainment completed the purchase of the casino.

It has sold all of its operations since declaring bankruptcy and as of February 2009 is making its final distribution of assets.

== Casinos and other operations ==
The company lost several million dollars in unsuccessful attempts get gambling franchises in Pittsburgh, Philadelphia, New York City, New Orleans and the Catskill Mountains. Its only operating casinos were:

- The President, Davenport, Iowa opened 1991 in (later acquired by Isle of Capri Casinos subsequently retired. Associated with the casino was the landmark Blackhawk Hotel in downtown Davenport.
- President Casino Broadwater Resort, Biloxi, Mississippi opened 1992 (acquired by Broadwater Development LLC in 2005 and destroyed shortly thereafter by Hurricane Katrina)
- President Casino Tunica Southern Mist, Tunica, Mississippi, opened 1993 and closed 1994 with the Southern Mist riverboat being moved to Biloxi.
- President Casino Laclede's Landing, St. Louis, Missouri, opened 1993 aboard the SS Admiral. Sold in bankruptcy in 2006 to Pinnacle Entertainment.
