= Good ship lollipop =

Good Ship Lollipop may refer to:

- "On the Good Ship Lollipop", a song made popular by Shirley Temple
- Good Ship Lollipop, a riverboat in the Gateway Clipper Fleet in Pittsburgh, Pennsylvania
