= President Casino Laclede's Landing =

Stationary riverboat casino

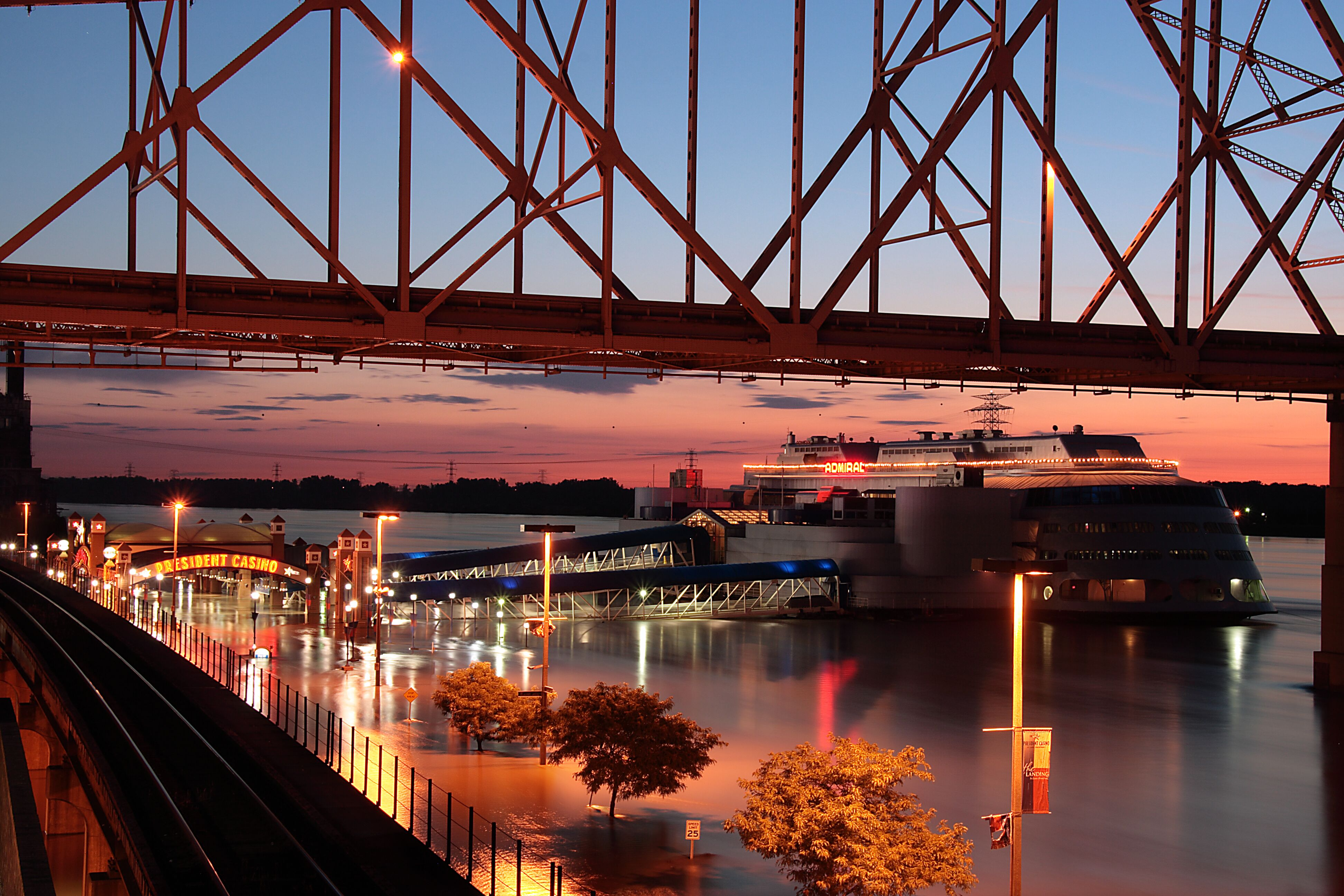
- President Casino Laclede's Landing in 2007.
- Interactive map of President Casino Laclede's Landing
- Location: St. Louis, Missouri; 1000 North Leonor K. Sullivan Boulevard; 38°37′59″N 90°10′54″W
- Opened: May 27, 1994
- Closed: June 24, 2010
- Gaming space: 70,000 sq ft (6,500 m^{2})
- Casino type: Riverboat
- Owner: Pinnacle Entertainment

President Casino Laclede's Landing was a stationary riverboat casino moored in the Mississippi River at St. Louis, Missouri. It operated from 1994 to 2010 aboard the SS Admiral. At the time of closure, it was owned by Pinnacle Entertainment.

== History ==
The SS Admiral had previously operated as a rail ferry from 1907 to 1930, as an excursion boat from 1940 to 1979, and as a stationary entertainment center from 1987 to 1988. In anticipation of the legalization of riverboat gambling in Missouri, John E. Connelly had it converted into a casino. The President Casino opened on May 27, 1994, immediately after receiving one of the first licenses from the newly-formed Missouri Gaming Commission.

When it opened, it included 100 table games and 150 video poker machines within its 70,000 square feet of gaming space, as early gaming regulations required games to be of skill. It was owned by the now-defunct President Casinos which had other riverboat casinos in the mid-1990s. Isle of Capri Casinos attempted to buy the President Casino unsuccessfully, but later, Pinnacle Entertainment bought the property for $46 million. The deal, completed on December 21, 2006, occurred at the same time Pinnacle was building its Lumière Place casino just adjacent to the President.

The casino was part of Pinnacle's two-casino Lumiere Place complex at Laclede's Landing (although Pinnacle in 2008 was reported to be considering moving it north to the Chain of Rocks Bridge). The 73,500 sq ft (6,830 m^{2}) casino featured 756 slots and twenty table games.

On June 24, 2010 the President Casino closed for good. Due to poor performance, the Missouri Gaming Commission had wanted to revoke its license, and eventually Pinnacle Entertainment decided to move on. It actually closed earlier than expected, due to flooding on the Mississippi River at the time.

The boat itself, the former SS Admiral, was cut up and sold for scrap after no buyer came forward.
