= SS Admiral (1907) =

Mississippi River steamboat, entertainment center, and casino

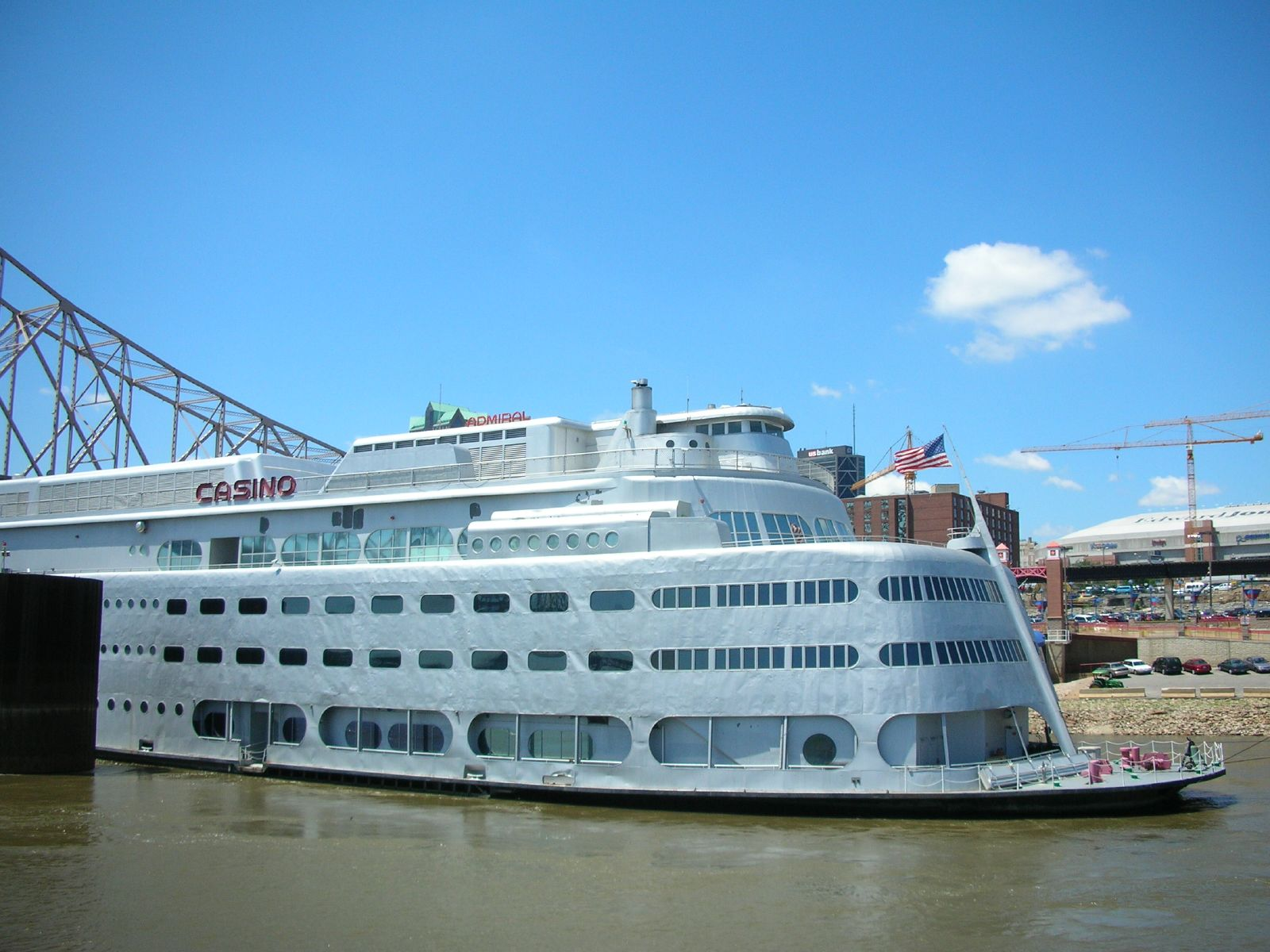
- Admiral in 2006

History
- Route: Mississippi River
- Launched: 1907
- Acquired: 1937
- In service: 1940
- Out of service: 1979
- Fate: 1992 – Operating as an entertainment and cruise boat; 2011 – Sold as scrap

General characteristics
- Length: 374 ft (114 m)
- Beam: 92 ft (28 m)
- Decks: 5
- Capacity: 4400

SS Admiral was a large riverboat launched as a steam-powered sidewheel ferry in 1907, SS Albatross, and converted in 1940 an excursion boat, then to diesel power in 1973. She operated on the Mississippi River from the Port of St. Louis, Missouri, until 1978, then became a floating attraction moored in the river at St. Louis.

She was briefly re-purposed as an amusement center in 1987 and then converted to a gambling venue called President Casino, also known as Admiral Casino, in the 1990s. In 1998 she was struck by barges which had come free from their tugboat, and was barely held to her moorings while 2,500 passengers were safely evacuated.

Starting in 2011, the vessel was dismantled for scrap. (Note: Curtis, Nancy (July 19, 2011). "The SS Admiral Makes its Last Voyage". St. Louis Magazine. ISSN 1090-5723.)

== Origin ==
Admiral was launched in 1907 as the metal-hulled sidewheeler Albatross, a ferry for heavy vehicles owned by the Yazoo and Mississippi Valley Railroad. With no bridge over the Mississippi River at Vicksburg, Mississippi, the railroads used a pair of car ferries to shuttle railcars across. The 374-foot (114 m) Albatross had rails built onto the deck, allowing railcars to roll onto the ship, take the short ride across the river, then roll onto tracks on the opposite shore. A bridge completed in 1930 rendered Albatross obsolete for its intended purpose, and it was retired from ferry service after 23 years.

== Rebuild ==
Albatross was acquired in 1935 by Streckfus Steamers, a company that ran excursion boats along the Mississippi and Ohio Rivers. The company refitted the steamer with a five-story, steel superstructure.

Her steel hull was divided into 74 compartments, of which up to 11 could be flooded with the ship still remaining afloat. The new steel framework was designed and fabricated by Banner Iron Works. The two massive piston shafts that drove the side paddle wheels were nicknamed Popeye and Wimpy and were visible from the lower deck.

Construction was completed in 1940 at a cost of over US$700,000 (equivalent to US$16,086,698 in 2025). Streckfus Steamers tested the rebuilt ship, rechristening it Admiral, on May 28, 1940.

The Art Deco exterior was designed by Mazie Krebs for Captain Joe Streckfus in 1933. The young Krebs was a fashion illustrator for the St. Louis department store Famous-Barr, and neither she nor Streckfus originally took the design seriously, but she designed another vessel for Streckfus, President, in 1934. (Note: Excursion boat Admiral under construction, using hull of sidewheel Albatross, built in 1907. New framework designed and fabricated by Banner Iron Works (Photograph). Missouri History Museum. 1938.)

== Excursion business ==
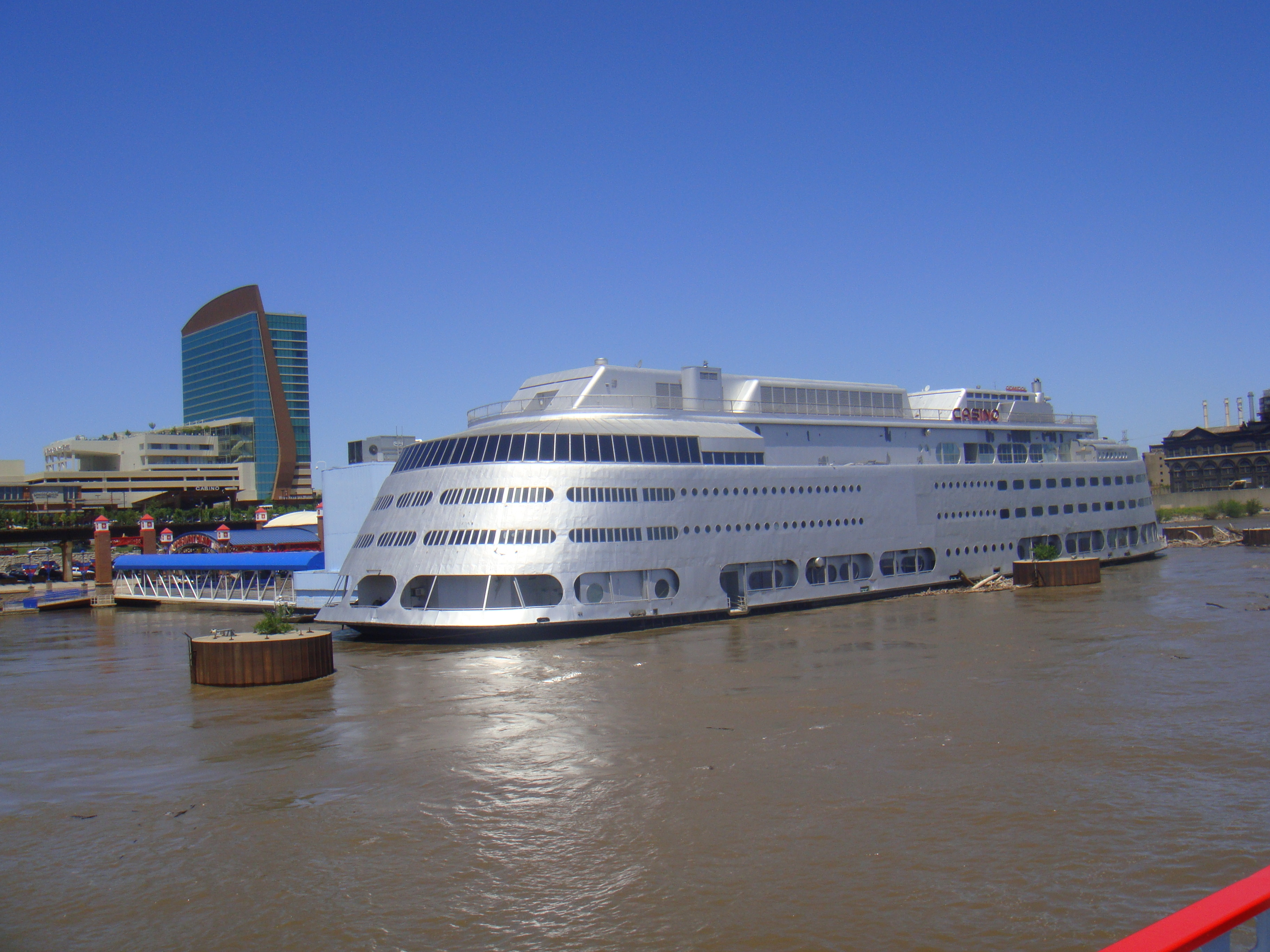
Admiral moored in the Mississippi River, just north of the Gateway Arch, 2010

The SS Admiral departed on her first excursion cruise from the St. Louis waterfront on June 12, 1940. The steamer could carry as many as 4,400 passengers. At first, operations included many all-day excursions but the market later shifted toward shorter trips. The Admiral operated every summer for decades, except in 1945 due to World War II.

Gangplanks led to the first deck, where popcorn was sold, and later, the company added a souvenir stand. The second and third decks were both air-conditioned, and together, these levels were called the "Cabin." A large ballroom — with a capacity of about 2,000 — occupied most of the second deck, overlooked by ceiling tiles decorated with signs of the zodiac. Tables and booths were all around the ballroom, and there was a bandstand for live music. The second deck also included a bar and a concession stand. The third deck, also known as the mezzanine level, was surrounded by large windows and featured several dining and lounge areas. A large powder room on the mezzanine was named and styled for Greta Garbo. Interior furnishings and other decorations were designed in the Art Deco mode.

The frame of the fourth level housed unglazed windows, creating a partly open-air deck. The main kitchen was located there, as well as a large lounge and dining area, with a cafeteria and a soda jerk. The top deck, or "lido deck," was the only place on Admiral available for completely open-air lounging. With unobstructed views, this was a vantage point for the St. Louis Arch, the top-terraced homes on the Chouteau's Bluff, the Eads Bridge, the Martin Luther King Bridge and the Jefferson Barracks Bridge. Several coin-operated telescopes facilitated close-up views. The pilothouse, whistles, lights, and the ship's calliope were also located on the lido deck. The vessel was nearby when the Arch was completed in October 1965.

In 1973, Streckfus Steamers converted Admiral from steam to diesel power, with the side paddlewheels and shafts removed and replaced by large Caterpillar engines and propellers, and a Cat-powered central shaft and propeller added.

== Stationary entertainment venue ==
In May 1979, weeks before its summer cruising season was set to begin, an inspection by the United States Coast Guard found weaknesses in the hull of Admiral and prohibited her from plying the Mississippi. That summer, the Admiral still operated by offering "shore parties" for visitors without leaving the dock. Facing an estimated US$1.5 million in repairs to the aging boat, Streckfus Steamers sold her in 1981 for US$600,000 to Pittsburgh businessman John E. Connelly, who had plans to move it to his hometown, though they were never realized. Connelly sent Admiral to Kentucky for repairs. Later, he returned it to St. Louis and sold it for US$1.5 million to a group of local investors, SS Admiral Partners.

A subsidiary of Six Flags, Six Flags Admiral Corporation, acquired Admiral and became the new general partner of SS Admiral Partners. The new ownership group invested US$31 million in the latest renovation: US$25 million in private funds and US$6 million from a federal grant. The fourth and fifth decks were converted to enclosed facilities. The ship was painted silver. A theater was added to the complex, along with a stationary multi-level docking facility. Several restaurants and a sports bar were located in the retired ship. The partnership decided not to undergo the expense of a dry dock inspection, but later replaced structural deficiencies. This, together with faulty construction and problems with labor, resulted in final capital costs of US$37 million, or US$11 million over the original estimate.

Hellmuth, Obata & Kassabaum was the architect on the project. Construction began in late 1984, with the general contractor, Fleischer-Seeger Construction, giving a deadline for completion of February 28, 1986. Fleischer-Seeger executives later admitted that the company had never had any intention of completing the work this quickly, that no work schedule matching that date was ever drawn up, and that the deadline was invented solely "to satisfy the lenders". Fleischer-Seeger was removed from the project in February 1986 and replaced by J.S. Alberici Construction Company.

The redeveloped Admiral was advertised as the only family-friendly riverboat of its kind in the nation, although in the evenings, admission was restricted to ages 21 or older. The entertainment center featured several music venues, a restaurant, and the Birdland Theater, a set of 14 animatronic birds which played music. Also included was the Mississippi Theater, which showed a film about the history of the St. Louis riverfront. In a nod to the ship's history, the interior was redesigned into a 1930s-inspired Art Deco style. Landmark Entertainment Group, headed by Gary Goddard, designed the interior and created the Birdland Theater.

Construction work was completed in time for a New Year's Eve party to be held on the ship on December 31, 1986, although it was still not ready to fully open. The Admiral reopened to the public on March 14, 1987, with a series of soft opening charity benefit events beginning on March 11. Guests of honor at the opening included Mazie Krebs, who had designed the ship's exterior in 1940, and Louis Bosso, who had been the first passenger to board the Admiral when it opened in 1940. Admission to the ship cost $4.95, a price that proved controversial compared to other entertainment venues in the area that were free to enter. Attendance was low throughout the following months.

By the end of October 1987, the managing partnership owed nearly $1 million to its creditors, and Connelly was planning to take over operations of the boat from Six Flags. On November 3, before the handover could be completed, Union Electric shut off the ship's electricity due to unpaid power bills, and Six Flags immediately shut down operations and laid off most of the ship's workforce. Since the Admiral was at that time open only from Wednesday to Saturday each week, the last day it was open to the public under Six Flags' management was therefore Saturday, October 31, and it did not open as previously scheduled on Wednesday, November 4.

Connelly spent $1.5 million to renovate the shuttered ship to a new entertainment format, and the admission fee was removed. The first attractions in the new Admiral, the Crystal Terrace restaurant and a nightclub called Vibrations, opened to the public on May 6, 1988. Other features, including the Grand Ballroom, opened in the following weeks. However, these changes were unsuccessful, in part because the Admiral was forced to compete with the President, another Connelly entertainment property. The entertainment center closed permanently on November 11, 1988.

== Casino ==
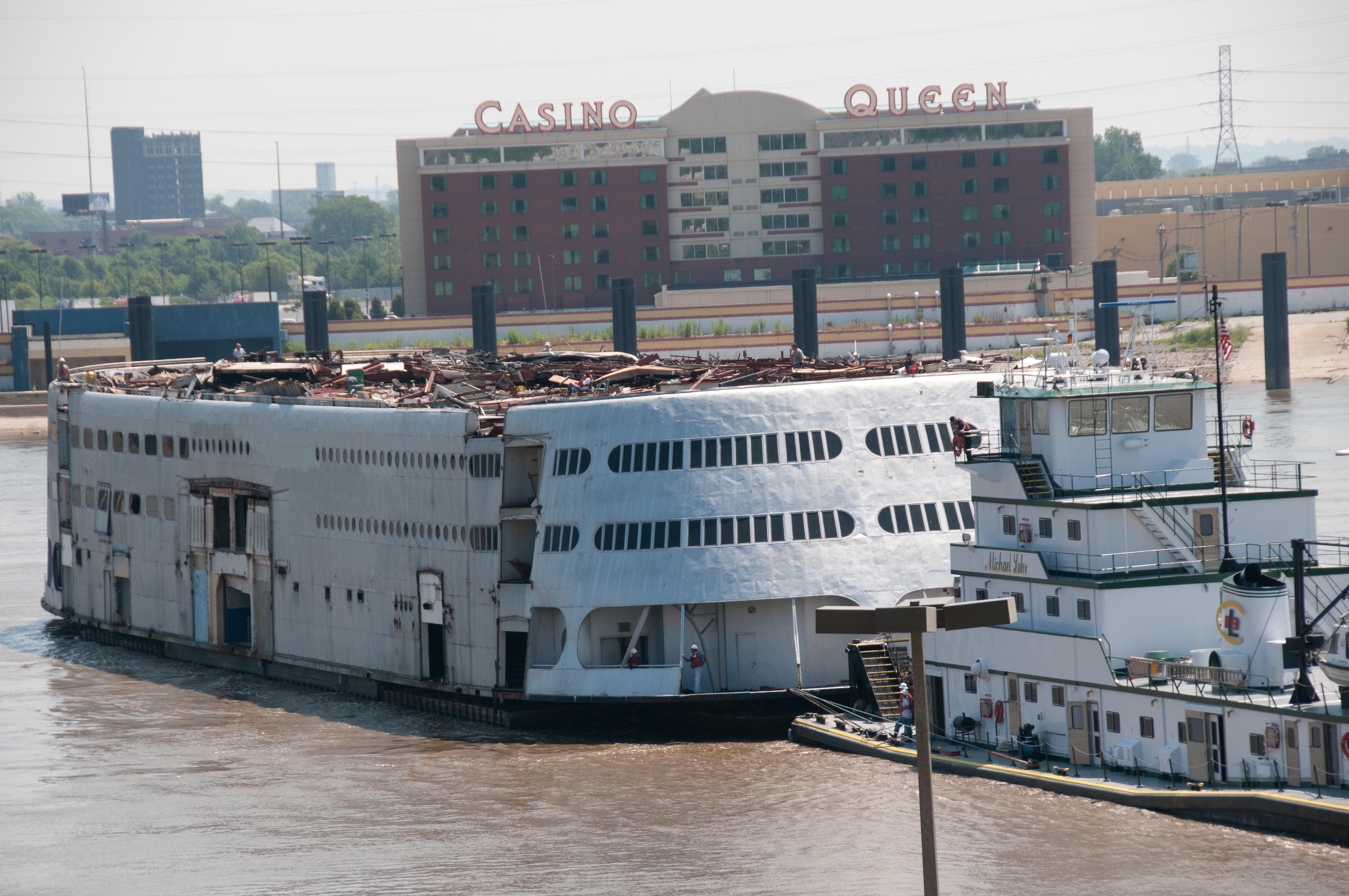
Admiral, minus her upper decks, is towed from St. Louis on July 19, 2011, to be dismantled.

In anticipation of the state of Missouri planning to legalize riverboat gambling, Admiral was moored near Eads Bridge and converted into President Casino Laclede's Landing. The casino opened on May 27, 1994, immediately after receiving one of the first licenses from the newly-formed Missouri Gaming Commission. It had 1,230 slot machines, 59 gambling tables, 18 restrooms, and one restaurant.

=== Barge collision ===
On April 4, 1998, the MV Anne Holly was pushing 12 loaded and two empty barges northbound on the Mississippi River through the St. Louis Harbor. About 19:50 CST she struck the Missouri-side pier of the center span of the Eads Bridge. Eight barges broke away from the tow and drifted back through the Missouri span. Three of these barges drifted toward Admiral. The drifting barges struck Admiral, causing 8 of its 10 mooring lines to break. Admiral rotated clockwise downriver, away from the Missouri riverbank. The captain of Anne Holly disengaged his vessel from the six remaining barges in the tow and placed Anne Holly's bow against Admiral's bow to hold it against the bank. About the time Anne Holly began pushing against Admiral, Admiral's next-to-last mooring line parted. Anne Holly and the single mooring wire that remained attached to Admiral's stern anchor held Admiral near the Missouri bank. 50 people were examined for minor injuries. Of those examined, 16 were sent to local hospitals for further treatment. Damages were estimated at US$11 million (equivalent to US$22 million in 2025). With the motorless Admiral wedged against the bank, rescue boats worked for hours shuttling about 2,500 people to safety.

=== 21st century and scrapping ===
In June 2005, it was reported that Columbia Sussex Corp. wanted to buy the President Casino on Admiral and replace it with a new vessel.

In August 2008, owner Pinnacle Entertainment was considering moving the boat north to the area near the Chain of Rocks Bridge. After the state refused to approve the deal, Pinnacle surrendered its gambling license and sold the ship to St. Louis Marine. The casino permanently closed on June 24, 2010, earlier than expected due to flooding on the Mississippi River. The top decks were removed, but further dismantling was delayed by the 2011 Mississippi River floods, which made it impossible to move the vessel downstream under the Eads Bridge. After the river lowered to a passable level, St. Louis Marine moved her remains on July 19, 2011, to Columbia, Illinois, and her lower decks were dismantled. The hull was then towed to Calvert City, Kentucky, where it was hauled out on the bank of the Tennessee River and scrapping was completed.
