= President Casino Broadwater Resort =

Former casino and resort in Mississippi

- Interactive map of President Casino Broadwater Resort
- Location: 2110 Beach Boulevard Biloxi, Mississippi 39531; 30°23′31″N 88°57′42″W
- Opened: August 13, 1992 (casino form); 1939 (resort form)
- Closed: July 31, 2005
- No. of rooms: 450 (2 structures)
- Gaming space: 38,000 sq ft (3,500 m^{2})
- Permanent shows: none
- Signature attractions: Marina, golf
- Casino type: Floating barge
- Owner: President Casinos
- Previous names: Broadwater Beach Hotel and Resort

The President Casino Broadwater Resort was a combined casino and resort that was located in Biloxi, Mississippi. It was a fixture on the Mississippi Gulf Coast for over 60 years.

Originally known as the Broadwater Beach Hotel and Broadwater Beach Resort, it opened in 1939 as a venue for the illegal but tacitly approved gambling that was flourishing along the coast. In the late 1950s and 1960s, the gambling stopped and the facility was renovated and re-purposed as a resort destination with a state-of-the-art marina and other amenities. In its heyday the Broadwater Beach Resort hosted movie stars, leading politicians, and top business figures as well as people on vacation. It became the Gulf Coast's flagship resort and its colorfully lit front sign was iconic.

In 1992, President Casinos gained control of the facility, and after changing the name, added a riverboat casino and barge. The casino had a successful niche following among lower-end gamblers, but the problems of the parent company resulted in bankruptcy filings in the early 2000s. In 2005, new owners closed the resort and casino shortly before Hurricane Katrina destroyed them.

The property has been empty since then. A plan in 2006–07 to build a new casino and resort there did not materialize. In 2020 a new joint venture involving the Universal Music Group was formed to build a music-central entertainment and casino resort at the site.

== Resort era ==
The Broadwater Beach Hotel was built in 1938 by investors seeking to gain the business of gamblers coming to casinos along the Mississippi Gulf Coast. It opened in 1939, and was built in Art Deco style. The first owner was Pete Martin Sr., a well-known gambler and rum runner along the coast. He openly ran a casino within the hotel, as even though it was nominally illegal at the time, gambling was part of the social and economic fabric of Biloxi. After Martin died, openly illegal gambling was frowned upon, and new owners tried to appeal to just the tourist market. In 1958, it was bought by Joe Brown, a Texas oil millionaire.

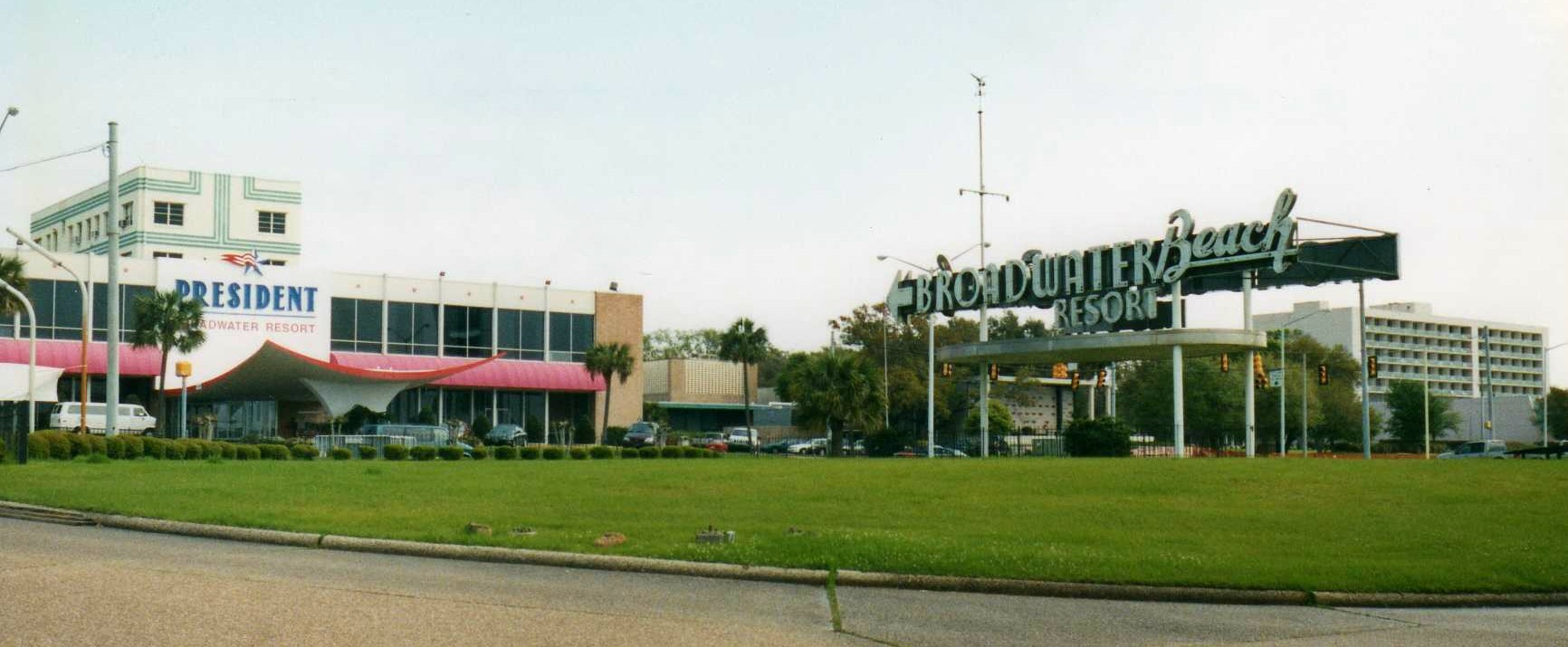
The Broadwater Beach Resort part, fallen on hard times by 2002, with the iconic sign in front.

Following his death in 1959, his widow Dorothy Brown, who was a noted New Orleans philanthropist, renovated the property for a more modern look, including a wide arched canopy in the front. In the early 1960s, the Mississippi Gulf Coast was emerging as a prime alternative to Florida as a southern vacation destination, and the Broadwater Beach Resort was considered the pacesetter for the area. In 1963, Dorothy Brown spent $3 million to build a marina and a heliport. The Broadwater Resort Marina plan was especially ambitious, involving hosting up to 150 sail and powerboats, and offering shore-to-ship maid service and room service to those docked, all in an effort to capture blue-water game fishing business. When the marina opened in 1965, it was considered state of the art. In 1968, she built the Broadwater Beach Sun Course on land originally owned by Jefferson Davis, and thus added golf as a prime attraction for visitors; by 1974 a Sea Course was also present. During the 1960s, a men's store was present in the hotel. For entertainment, the hotel featured musicians from New Orleans and elsewhere. From the 1950s on, operational control of the hotel and resort rested with Leigh MacConnell, one of the few women to rise to the top of the local hotel industry in that era. In the 1960s the Broadwater Beach Resort found its glory years. Hosting movie stars, leading politicians, and top business figures, as well as people on vacation, it became the Gulf Coast's flagship resort. During this decade, the iconic and colorfully lit Broadwater Beach Resort front sign was added.

In 1966, when Mississippi became the last state to repeal its prohibition on alcohol, the Broadwater Beach Hotel was one of the first three businesses in the state to receive a permit for selling liquor, alongside the Buena Vista and White House hotels. The resort's manager at the time, T. M. Dorsett, became the first person to legally buy and drink an alcoholic beverage in Mississippi since 1909, in a publicized event in the hotel's lounge on July 27, 1966.

Hurricane Camille devastated the Mississippi Gulf Coast in August 1969. The resort golf club pro and his wife fought for their lives as the storm wrecked their pro shop apartment. The hotel's first floor was carved out by the storm surge, expensive furniture floated out of the lobby, and the marina suffered moderate damage. But the resort rebounded and by 1977 it was described by The New York Times as a "bustling colony of rooms, cottages, restaurants, golf courses, tennis courts, and its own marina." Conferences were held there, and the Broadwater Beach Hotel was the setting for a fictional regional sales meeting in the 1982 Frederick Barthelme short story "Box Step".

== Casino era ==
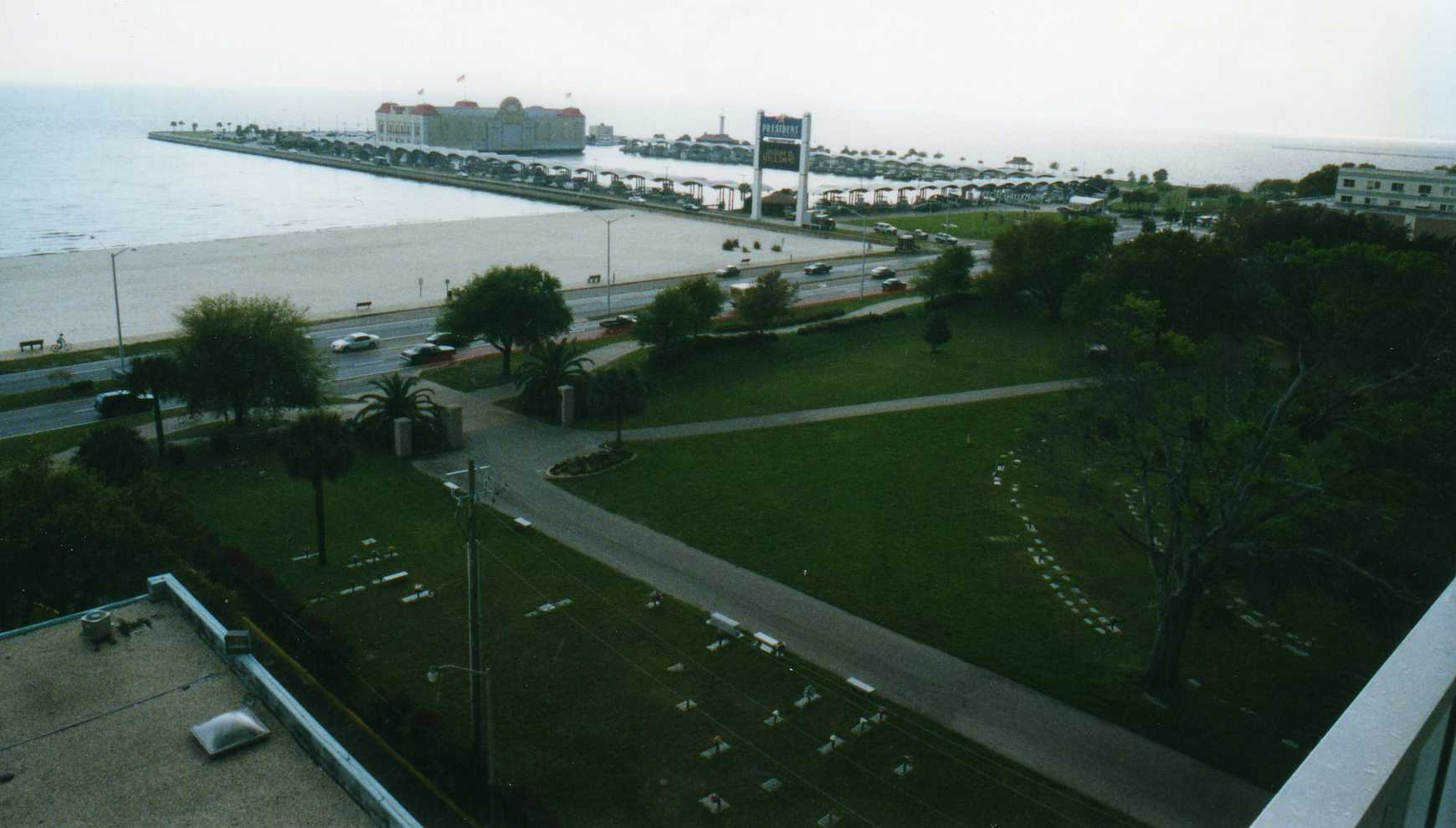
From the hotel portion, the resort's grounds, beach, marina, and casino could be seen, in a 2002 view.

Entrepreneur John E. Connelly, founder of President Casinos, then gained control of the property, and the President Casino Broadwater Resort was opened aboard a riverboat docked at the Broadwater Resort Marina in August 1992. It was the second casino to open on the Mississippi Gulf Coast, following the Isle of Capri Casino which opened two weeks earlier. In June 1995, President Casinos replaced the riverboat with the former Mississippi Gold Shore Casino barge. The table games there were known for having lower limits than most other Biloxi casinos. Major country music stars performed there on Wednesday through Saturday nights, and the hotel had 550 rooms available across two structures. In 1997 and 1999, titles to the resort property and barge were formally transferred from Connelly to President Casinos.

By the early 2000s, the President Casino Broadwater Resort sat on 260 acres (1.1 km^{2}). The powerboat-oriented Broadwater Resort Marina had 118 berths, and was regarded by one published guide as "one of the best full-service, luxurious marinas between Mobile and New Orleans." The President Broadwater Golf Club offered a full-length 18-hole course. The casino featured over 38,000 square feet (3,500 m^{2}) of gambling with over 900 slot machines. However, no work had been done on the old resort and its hotel, resulting in its declining in appearance to a run-down state. The hotel capacity was down to 450 rooms and suites, and functioned mainly as a place for the casino barge customers to sleep briefly; furniture was piled up in corridors, the hotel main floor entertainment rooms were empty, and weeds grew on the resort's tennis courts. Nevertheless, the resort still made reference to its pre-casino past, calling itself "one of the last great Southern resorts on the Mississippi Gulf Coast."

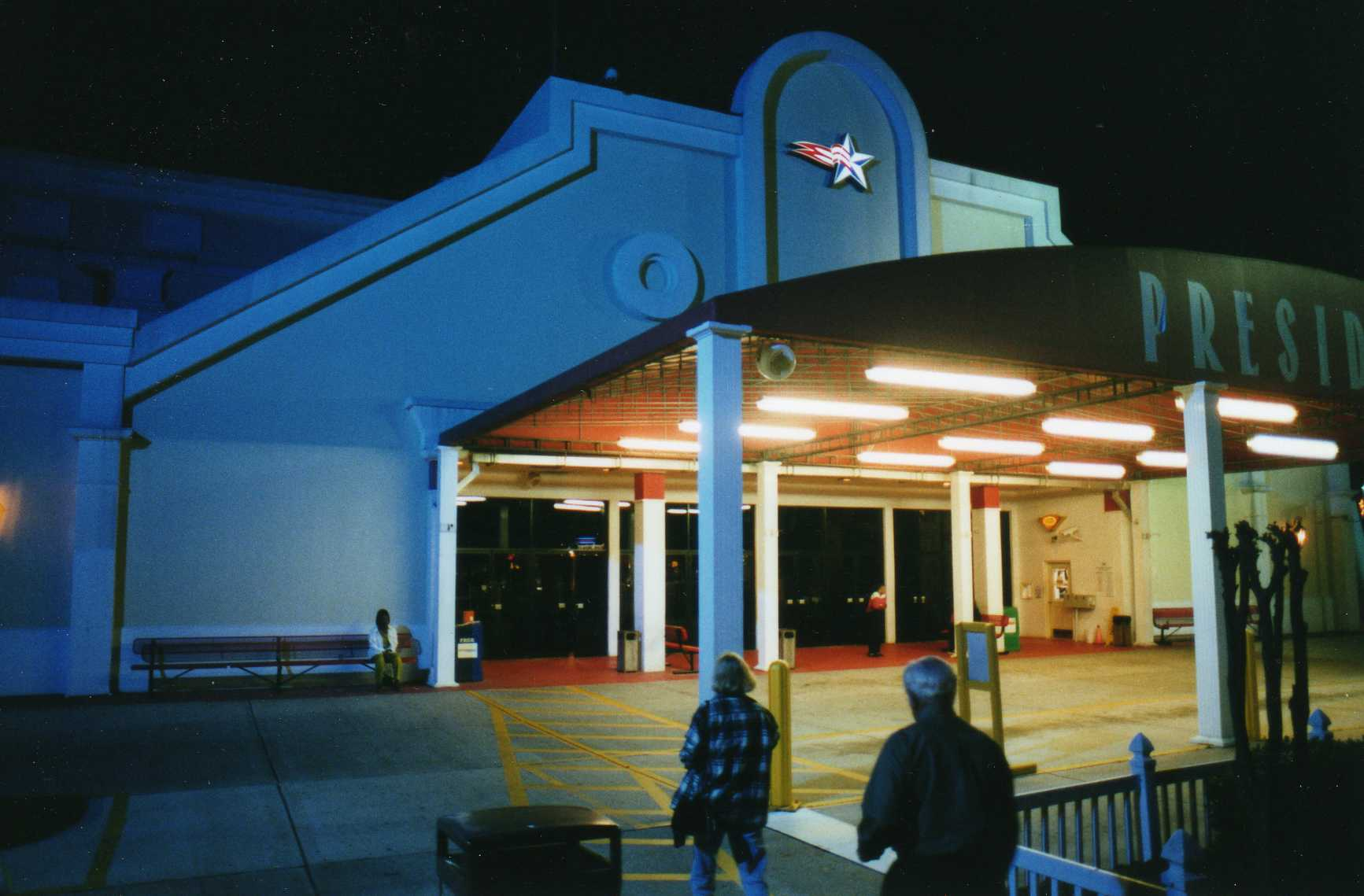
The President Casino Broadwater entrance, 2002.

The casino itself found a niche market among local gamblers and was a reliable earner. President Casinos was saddled with corporate debt, however, and a planned new $2 billion resort at the site, to be called Destination Broadwater, never materialized. In April 2001, the President Broadwater Hotel, which represented the non-casino operations, filed for bankruptcy. President Casinos filed for bankruptcy in June 2002, and the Broadwater casino the following month, but operation of the President Casino Broadwater Resort continued.

== End ==
In January 2005, Broadwater Development LLC – a casino holding company owned by two local construction figures, Roy Anderson III and Cotton Fore – won a bankruptcy auction bid for the casino and resort for $82 million, amid speculation that they had overpaid. Anderson said of the barge, "It's a nice structure. But overall aesthetically, it's not going to fit into our master plan." On April 15, 2005, the deal closed; as part of it, the President Casino barge was purchased for $6.8 million by Silver Slipper Casino Venture LLC with the intention of operating it under the name of President Casino until it could be moved to their site in Hancock County, Mississippi, where the Silver Slipper operators thought it would fit in. On July 31, 2005, the Broadwater Beach Resort closed its doors, with Broadwater Development announcing plans to tear it down and build a new resort and casino.

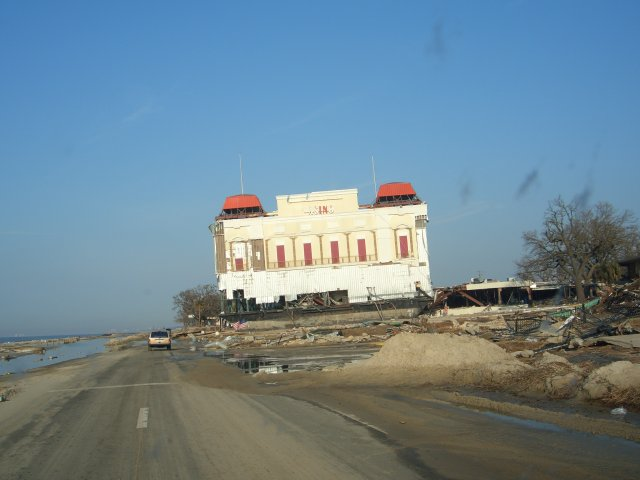
President Casino Barge after it was washed ashore by Hurricane Katrina, 2005

Less than a month later, on August 29, 2005, Hurricane Katrina tore the casino barge from its moorings and washed it ashore ½ mile west of the Broadwater Resort Marina. The barge was a total loss, it was cut up as scrap and removed by a salvage company. (After the state passed legislation allowing riverboat casinos to build on solid ground with a traditional foundation as long as they were near navigable waterways, the new Silver Slipper Casino would be built from the ground up instead and open in late 2006.) The hotel in the resort part was still standing but heavily damaged by Katrina, with the storm surge reaching the second floor. The famed sign was destroyed. The marina too was wrecked and closed. The golf course did not reopen. The hotel subsequently underwent demolition, which concluded by November 2006 with even the foundation slabs removed.

== Proposals for property ==
Once the post-Katrina building boom began, the Broadwater site increased in value and several other casino operations indicated an interest in it. In March 2006, Broadwater Development LLC gained city approval for creating The Broadwater resort, a $1 billion plan that would feature two casinos, 3,375 condo units, 1,900 hotel rooms, an 18-hole golf course, large amounts of retail entertainment space and convention space, and a marina again. By September 2007, the Broadwater developers said they were close to signing with an international entertainment corporation to begin the work, and the Biloxi Planning Commission granted them an 18-month extension. But by October 2008, the 2008 financial crisis had prevented anything from happening, and the Mississippi Gaming Commission gave an indefinite extension to the Broadwater site approval.

In the event, nothing happened, and by 2017 the site and the marina had been, as the local newspaper stated, "Lifeless for more than 11 years". One of the Broadwater Development LLC owners said they had seen some interest in the property, but no realistic offers.

In October 2020, a new joint venture between the Universal Music Group and Dakia U-Ventures was formed to create music-themed entertainment luxury resorts. One of the first resorts was planned to be at this Biloxi site; under the name UMusic Broadwater Hotel, the property would be transformed into a $1.2 billion destination, with an expansive live music venue, casino, and a large resort hotel.
