= Verne Swain =

American steam packet and excursion boat

History
- Name: First Verne Swain
- Owner: Acme Steam Packet Company, Dixon Brothers Lee Lines
- Route: Mississippi River
- Builder: Swain Shipyard
- Cost: $10,000
- Completed: 1889

General characteristics
- Length: 120 ft (37 m)
- Beam: 22.6 ft (6.9 m)
- Draught: 5 ft (1.5 m)
- Decks: 3
- Propulsion: Steam powered, sternwheeler

Verne Swain
History
- Name: Second Verne Swain
- Owner: Captain George Prince; Lyons Brothers; Valley Line Steamers
- Route: Mississippi River
- Builder: Swain Shipyard
- Completed: 1904

General characteristics
- Length: 131 ft (40 m)
- Beam: 28.5 ft (8.7 m)
- Draft: 4.4 ft (1.3 m)
- Propulsion: Steam powered, sternwheeler

Verne Swain
History
- Name: Third Verne Swain
- Route: Illinois River; Pittsburgh–Wheeling, WV packet
- Builder: Swain Shipyard
- Completed: 1913

General characteristics
- Length: 186 ft (57 m)
- Beam: 31 ft (9.4 m)
- Draft: 4.9 ft (1.5 m)
- Propulsion: Steam powered, sidewheeler

Verne Swain refers to three steamboats built by the Swain Shipyard of Stillwater, Minnesota. Swain built the first one in 1886, the second one in 1904, and the last one in 1913.

== First Verne Swain ==
The first Verne Swain was a steamboat built by David Swain of Stillwater, Minnesota, and put into packet service between Clinton, Iowa and Davenport, Iowa by Swain in 1886.

In 1889, John Streckfus purchased the Verne Swain from the Swain Shipyard in Stillwater, Minnesota for $10,000. Verne Swain had a cargo deck, a passenger deck, and a Texas deck. The boat was propelled by two side-mounted paddlewheels. This was his first steamboat acquisition for the Acme Packet Company of Rock Island, Illinois. He ran Verne Swain on daily service, leaving each morning from Clinton, Iowa at 7am, with arrivals scheduled for Davenport, Iowa at 10am. The return trips started from Davenport at 3pm scheduled to arrive at the home port at 8:15pm.

in 1891, Eagle Packet Company purchased the Verne Swain and commenced packet service between Peoria, Illinois and St. Louis.

in 1900, Dixon Brothers of Peoria, Illinois acquired the Verne Swainand renamed it Speed.

== Second Verne Swain ==
Also built at the Swain Shipyard in Stillwater, the second Verne Swain was designed for excursion. Completed in 1904, the second Verne Swain was a sternwheeler with a wooden hull ordered for running excursions from Peoria, Illinois to the World's Fair in St. Louis. The steamer was passed through various owners while serving Mississippi and Tennessee. The ship sunk in August 1929 at Dismal Point, Arkansas.

== Third Verne Swain ==
In 1913, Swain Shipyard completed the last known steamboat to be named, Verne Swain. First running on the Illinois River as an excursion boat, Captain Fred Hornbrook acquired Verne Swain in 1918 to deploy the 186-foot sidewheeler as a packet between Wheeling, West Virginia and Pittsburgh, Pennsylvania. Later, Verne Swain was sold and reassigned to excursions.

The steamer persisted long enough to be renamed Rose Island, Roosevelt, and City of Memphis.
