= Historic Grand Hotels on the Mississippi Gulf Coast =

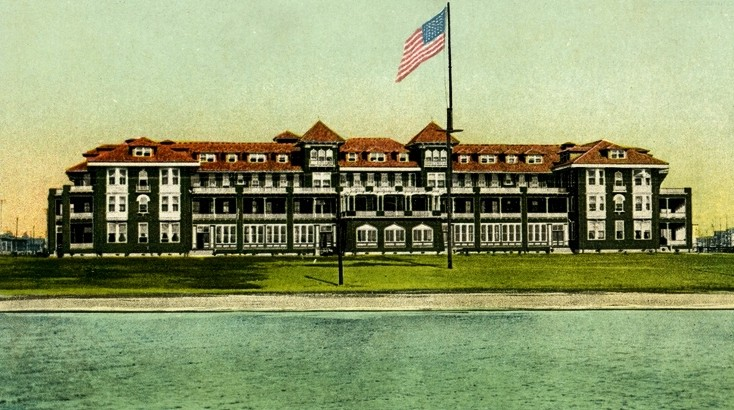
Great Southern Hotel in 1906, as viewed from the Mississippi Sound

In 1870, the Louisville and Nashville Railroad was constructed through the southernmost section of Harrison County, Mississippi, connecting New Orleans, Louisiana, and Mobile, Alabama. A northern transportation route into south Mississippi was provided by the Gulf and Ship Island Railroad at the turn of the 20th century. These railroads provided an inexpensive means for moving passengers as well as goods, and opened south Mississippi to both industrial and recreational development. Rapidly progressing lumber and seafood industries transformed the Mississippi Gulf Coast in the 1920s, and people arrived from throughout the United States to take advantage of the economic boom. Northern tourists were attracted to the Mississippi Gulf Coast because of mild winters and cool sea breezes in summer, before the introduction of air conditioning. Besides the weather, other tourist attractions included seafood restaurants, swimming, golf, schooner races, sailing to offshore islands, and recreational fishing. During this period of economic expansion, grand hotels were constructed along the Mississippi Gulf Coast to accommodate businessmen, tourists, and transient workers. Most of these grand hotels no longer exist; and of the two structures that were still standing after the first decade of the 21st century, neither served as a lodging establishment. Together, these grand hotels represented an important era in the history of the Mississippi Gulf Coast throughout the 20th century.

== Great Southern Hotel (Gulfport) ==
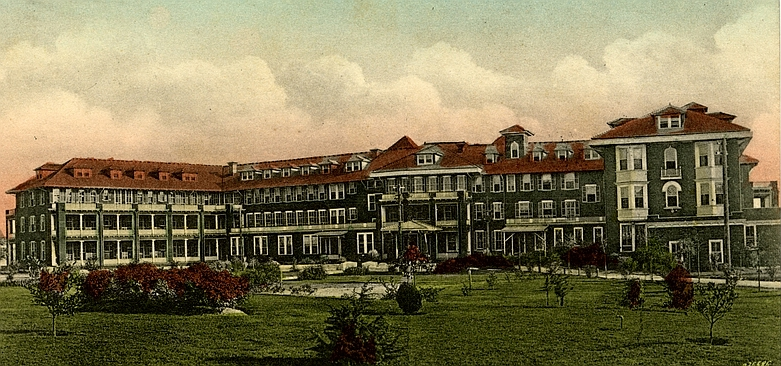
Great Southern Hotel, circa 1920

Built in 1902 to 1903 by entrepreneur Joseph T. Jones and designed by Mississippi Gulf Coast native and New Orleans–based architect Thomas Sully, the Great Southern Hotel had unheard of luxuries for the time—telephones in every guest room, hot and cold running water, and a bath for every two rooms. The hotel was situated within a few hundred yards (meters) of the Mississippi Sound. It was a 3-story frame building of wood construction with 250 guest rooms. The hotel had its own artesian water well, independent sewerage system, and an independent power plant for steam heat and electricity. Guest amenities included a billiard room, tennis court, horse-and-buggy rental, and an in-house orchestra. In 1908, the Jones family funded construction of the Great Southern Golf and Country Club to attract more guests to their hotel. The grand hotel was crippled by economics of the Great Depression but held on through the 1940s. During construction of U.S. Route 90 in 1951, the Great Southern Hotel was demolished.

== White House Hotel (Biloxi) ==
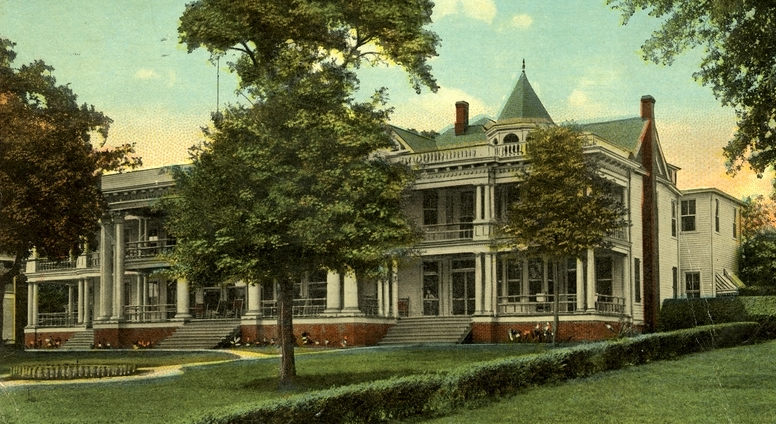
circa 1920

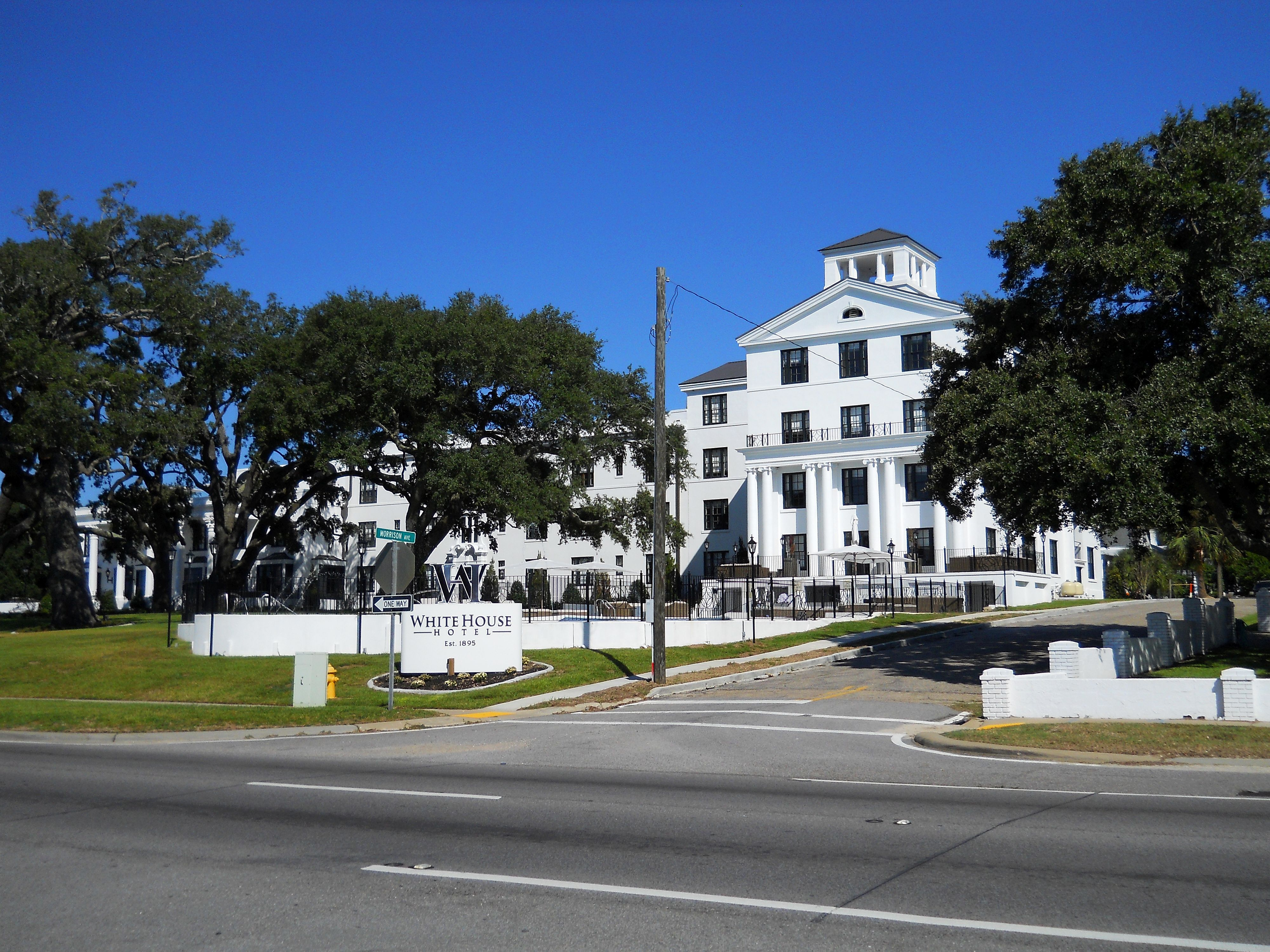
2014

White House Hotel

The White House Hotel began as a rooming house in the large home of Mississippi attorney and circuit court judge Walter White. Between 1900 and 1930, it was White's wife who transformed neighborhood mansions, connected by pillared porches and renovations, into what would become the White House Hotel. James Love, Jr., owner of Biloxi's Buena Vista Hotel, acquired the White House property in 1940, modernized the buildings, and added a swimming pool. Business thrived until 1971, when the Love family sold the hotel, and it began a slow decline. The hotel passed through a succession of owners, and in 1988, bankruptcy was declared. The hotel was boarded up and abandoned. In 1989, the son of James Love bought the hotel with plans to return it to its former glory, but did not begin restoration until 10 years after he acquired the property. Renovation efforts stopped when financing fell through after the 2001 terrorist attacks on the U.S. and subsequently by devastation to the Mississippi Gulf Coast from Hurricane Katrina, and harsh economic times from the Great Recession. In May 2012, the hotel was added to Biloxi's list of blighted properties, and the owner was given the choice of demolishing the structure, renovating it to meet city codes, or selling it to a developer. In April 2013, the City of Biloxi announced that the White House Hotel had been sold to a Mississippi developer. Although closed for 30 years, the hotel was completely renovated and reopened for business on August 1, 2014.

== Buena Vista Hotel (Biloxi) ==
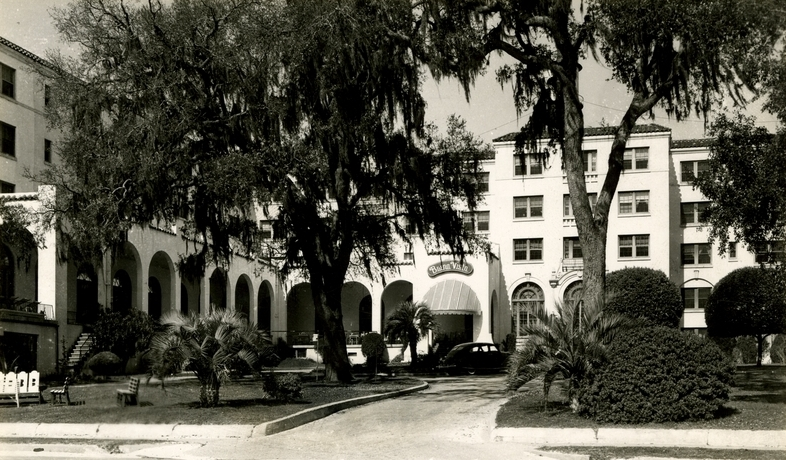
Buena Vista Hotel, circa 1940

The Buena Vista Hotel was designed by architect Carl Matthes with a mission-style, stucco design and opened on July 4, 1924. The Buena Vista was five stories tall with 200 guest rooms. The hotel was built in a U-shape facing the Mississippi Sound on the north side of the Old Spanish Trail which became U.S. Route 90. Although the hotel almost closed for lack of business during the Great Depression, it was purchased by local attorney, James Love Jr. in 1938, and began a comeback, as the new owner developed the concept of attracting convention business. Within 15 years, Love and his staff had transformed Gulf Coast tourism by attracting more than 100 conventions to the hotel each year. During summers, the hotel hosted Mississippi's Miss Hospitality Pageant, and business thrived through the 1950s. In 1958, a new motel style addition was added on the beach side of the hotel, south of U.S. Route 90. With the construction of motel chains and the Interstate Highway System in the 1960s, business began to decline at the Buena Vista because tourists had more lodging options throughout the Gulf Coast. The death blow came in 1969 when Hurricane Camille blew out windows and its tidal surge flooded the hotel lobby and ground floor. Love sold the property in 1971, and the grand hotel slowly deteriorated. The hotel was destroyed by fire in 1991, and the property was purchased for economic development in 1993. In 2013, the Governor of Mississippi and Biloxi city officials announced plans for a minor league baseball park to be built on the site of the former Buena Vista Hotel. MGM Park opened on June 6, 2015, as the home field for the Biloxi Shuckers baseball team.

== Edgewater Gulf Hotel (Biloxi) ==
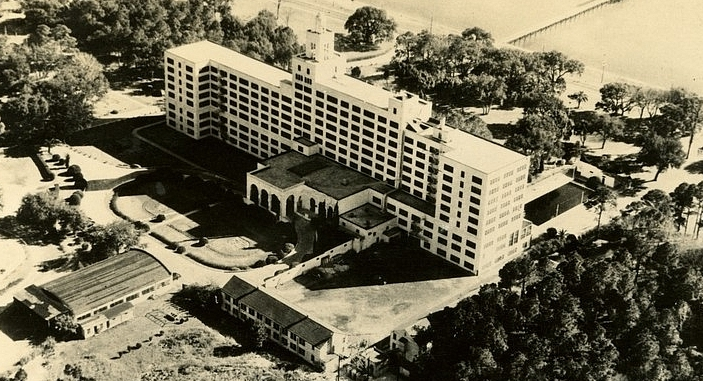
Edgewater Gulf Hotel, circa 1940

Designed by architects Marshall and Fox and constructed by the owners of Chicago's Edgewater Beach Hotel in 1924 to 1926 with 400 guest rooms, the Edgewater Gulf Hotel was one of the largest on the Mississippi Gulf Coast. Guests that arrived in south Mississippi by train could disembark at the rail station on the hotel grounds at Edgewater Park. Early advertisements promoted the hotel as an air conditioned, fireproofed structure, and the hotel's design allowed 95 percent of the rooms to have a view of the Mississippi Sound. In the formal dining room, guests ate on fine china atop heavy linen tablecloths with a view of the Gulf waters. The hotel complex was situated on 600 acres (243 hectares) that included gardens, a golf course, tennis courts, and a glass-enclosed swimming pool. The Edgewater Gulf weathered the Great Depression and attracted many post-World War II conventions which boosted its business. It retained its grandeur through the 1960s, but closed in 1970, unable to compete with newer hotels. In 1971, the grand hotel was demolished by implosion to make way for expansion of Edgewater Mall shopping center.

== Pine Hills Hotel (Pass Christian) ==
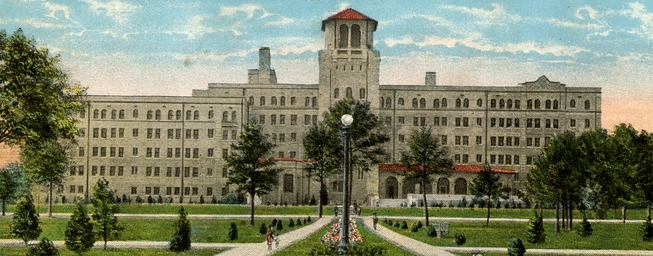
Pine Hills Hotel, circa 1930

The Pine Hills Hotel was built on a 2,300-acre (930 ha) former plantation in the mid-1920s by New Orleans architect Moise Goldstein. The property contained 3.5 miles (5.6 km) of shoreline along the Bay of Saint Louis and was located approximately 1.5 miles (2.4 km) from the Old Spanish Trail Highway. The 185 guest rooms in the Mediterranean style hotel were arranged in suites to accommodate family groups. Guest facilities included kitchens, recreation rooms, convention facilities, and elevators. Outdoor amenities included tennis courts, a boat marina, an 18-hole golf course, horseback riding, and a shooting range.

Within a month after its formal opening in 1926, the hotel was filled to capacity. Nevertheless, the secluded location away from the Mississippi Sound, and the economics of the Great Depression, resulted in the hotel's closure in the 1930s. After sitting vacant for more than a decade, the facility was used by U.S. Army Engineers during World War II. In 1953, the Oblates of Mary Immaculate Religious Order purchased the property and operated a seminary until 1968; in 1969, Hurricane Camille caused significant damage to the hotel structure.

In the 1970s, DuPont acquired the hotel property for development of a chemical plant, and the Pine Hills Hotel was demolished in 1986.

== Markham Hotel (Gulfport) ==
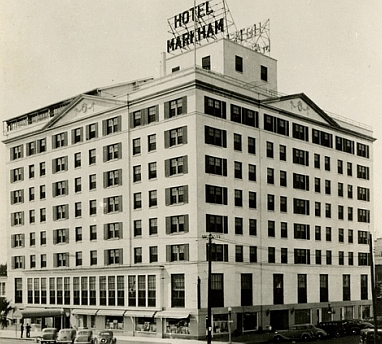
circa 1940

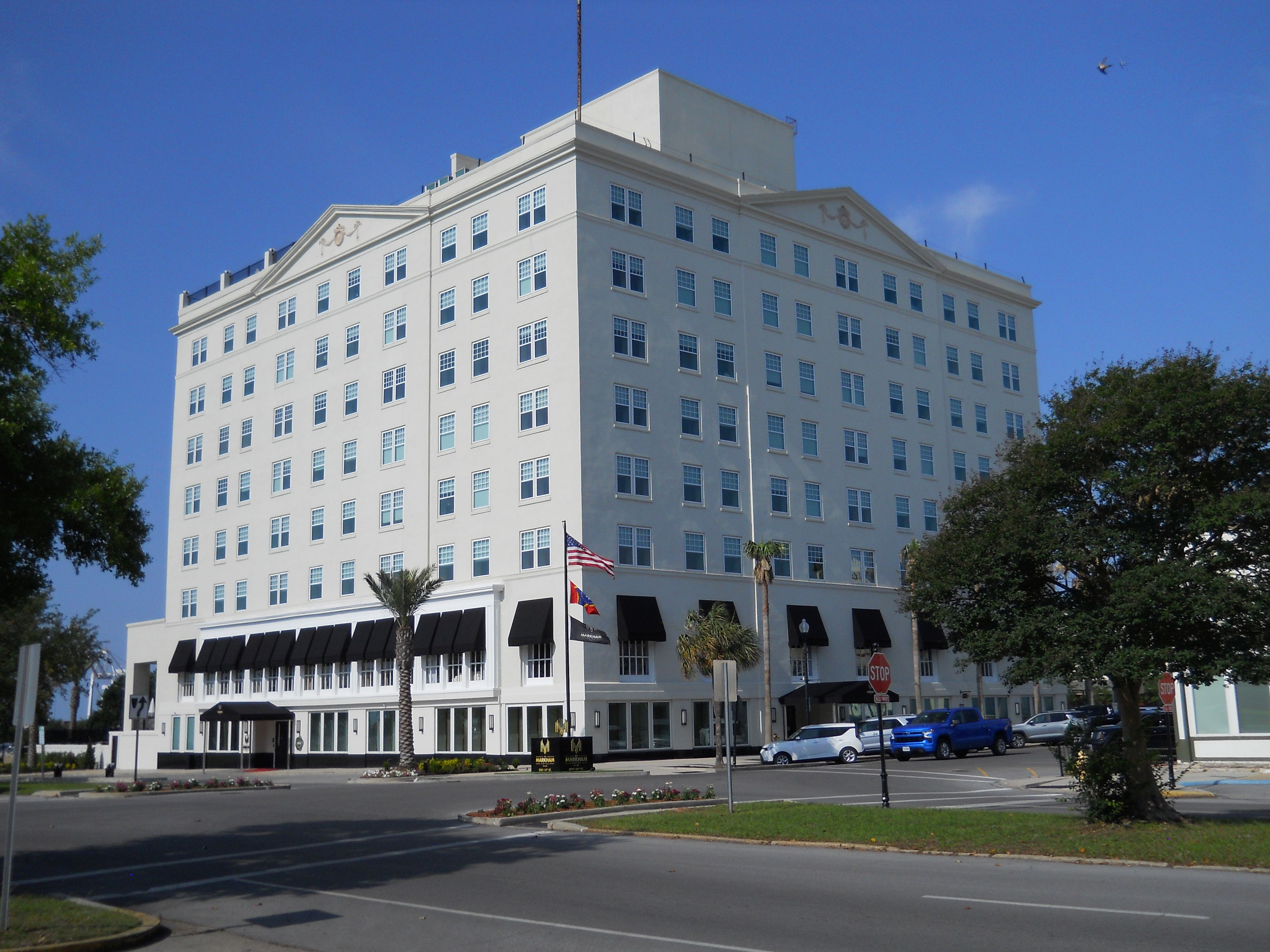
2026

Markham Hotel

The Markham Hotel building is located in downtown Gulfport, about one city block from the Mississippi Sound. The 8-story hotel was designed by architectural firm Marshall and Fox. It opened in January 1927, and was named for Charles Markham, a former president of the Illinois Central Railroad. The Markham contained 180 guest rooms and catered mainly to business clientele. Amenities included a formal dining room, swimming pool, and rooftop garden. As with other grand hotels of the period, the Markham lost business to newer, more modern hotels with the passage of time.

In the 1970s, the Markham was renovated into an office complex, and the swimming pool was converted into a parking lot. A second renovation in 1987 retained its use as an office building. In 2005, Hurricane Katrina's tidal surge flooded the ground floor and hurricane-force winds damaged the roof of the structure. The property was then sold to a private investor, with no effort to repair or preserve the building. The Markham building is a contributing resource in the Gulfport Harbor Square Commercial Historic District, as listed on the National Register of Historic Places. In 2011, the Markham was named as one of the ten most endangered historic places in Mississippi by the Mississippi Heritage Trust.

In July 2016, the Markham building was sold to a developer with plans to renovate the structure. In September 2018, renovation work began to transform the Markham building back into a hotel.

Fifty-six years after the original hotel closed and 20 years after the office complex was shuttered, the Markham Hotel reopened to the public on April 23, 2026. The renovated hotel contains 115 guest rooms with modern amenities, and developers retained many of the building's historical architectural features.

== Tivoli Hotel (Biloxi) ==
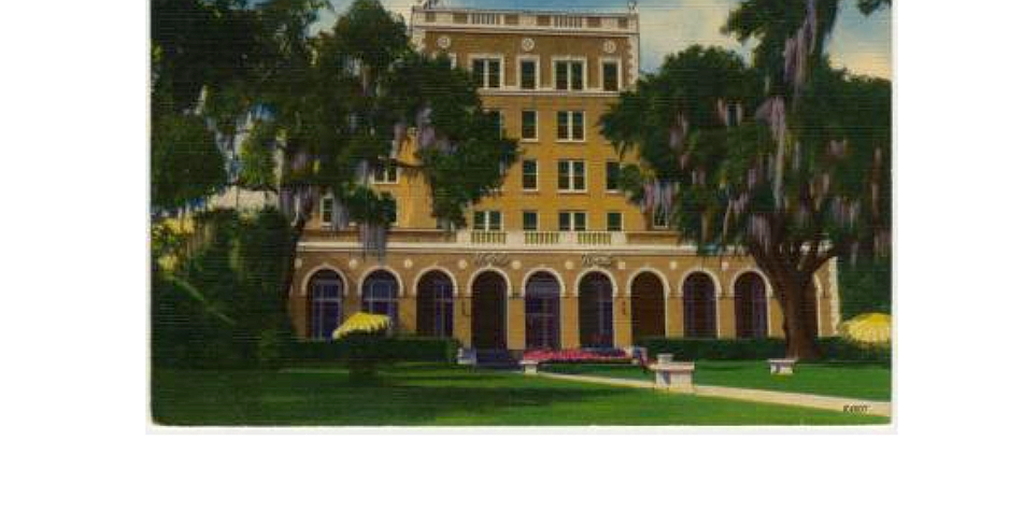
Tivoli Hotel, 1956

The Tivoli Hotel was built in 1927 as a 6-story, T-shaped brick structure in Second Renaissance Revival architectural style. It was one of only four historic Mississippi Coast hotels still standing, but abandoned, at the turn of the 21st century. In 2005, a casino barge slammed into the structure during Hurricane Katrina. In 2006, the hotel was demolished.

== Broadwater Beach Hotel (Biloxi) ==
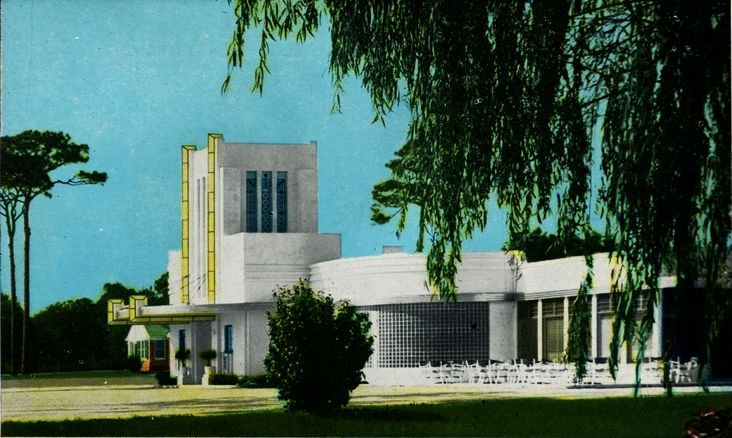
circa 1940

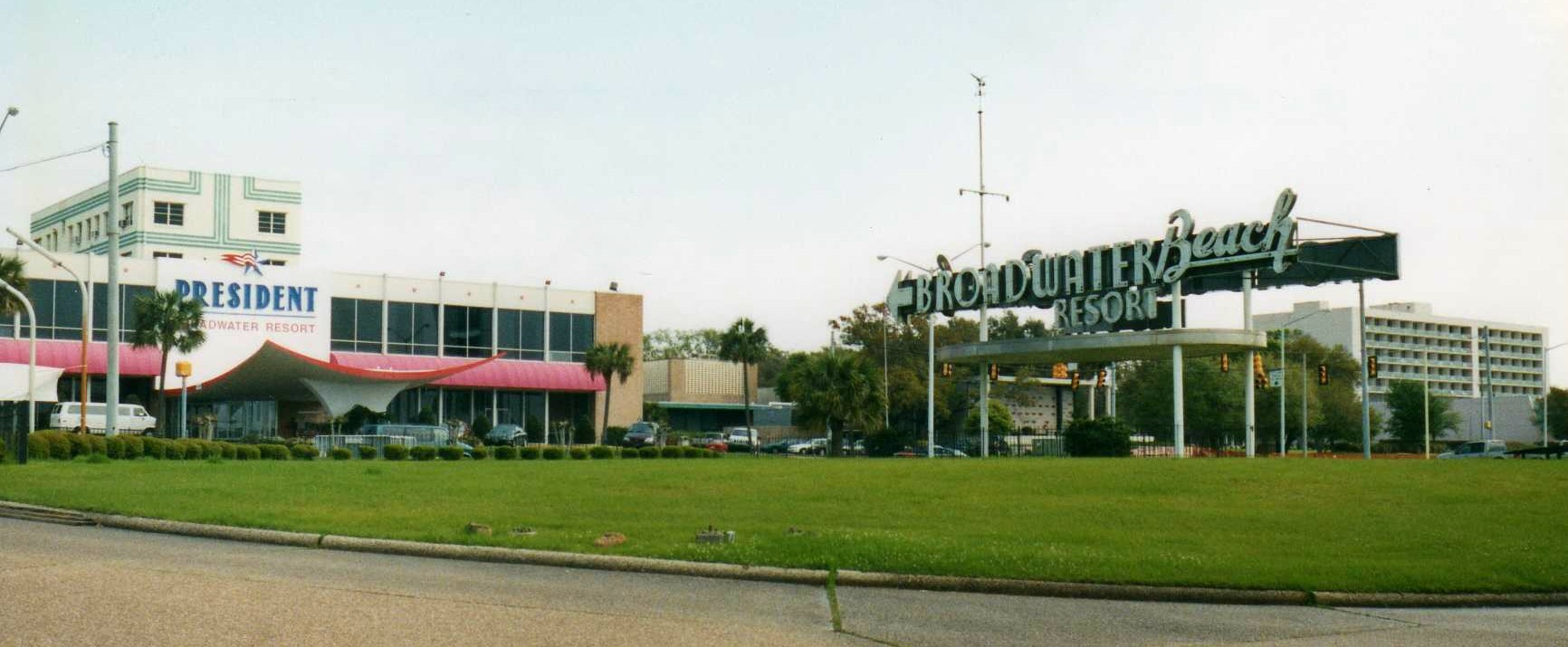
2002

Broadwater Beach Hotel

The Broadwater Beach Hotel was constructed in 1938 using Art Deco architectural style. During the 1940s, the original owner operated a casino in the hotel, even though gambling was not technically legal in Mississippi. Ownership changed hands through the years, and gambling was phased out in the 1950s. The hotel developed into a resort and tourist destination with a golf course and marina. When gambling was legalized in Mississippi in the 1990s, the hotel and 260-acre (105 hectares) resort was acquired by President Casinos and became the President Casino Broadwater Resort. In July 2005, the President Broadwater Hotel closed its doors as a result of bankruptcy proceedings. The next month, the hotel was heavily damaged by Hurricane Katrina’s tidal surge and was demolished in 2006.

== See also ==
- Grand Hotel (Point Clear, Alabama)
