= SS Admiral =

Steamships that have been named Admiral include:

- SS Admiral (1899), renamed Edward U. Demmer, a Great Lakes steamer that sank in Lake Huron in 1923
- SS Admiral (1907), a Mississippi riverboat that was scrapped in 2011
- Lourenço Marques, which was launched as Admiral in 1905 and renamed in 1916
- Rosalind (1890 ship), which was named Admiral from 1891 until 1902
