= Broadwater Development =

Broadwater Development is a casino holding company that is privately owned by Roy Anderson III, owner of Roy Anderson Corporation construction company, W.C. "Cotton" Fore, president of Gulfport-based W.C. Fore Trucking Inc., and Miami-based Dezer Development Group.

== History ==
On January 20, 2005, the company won a bid for the President Casino Broadwater Resort for $82 million in a bankruptcy action. Foxwoods Development abandoned plans to purchase 15 acres (6.1 ha) of land from Broadwater for a casino on April 26, 2006.

In June 2020, the company announced an agreement with Dakia Entertainment Hospitality to develop a $1.2 billion, 266-acre entertainment facility by summer 2023 in Biloxi, MS.
