= John E. Connelly =

American businessman (1925–2009)

- Born: John Edward Connelly; August 12, 1925; Pittsburgh, Pennsylvania, U.S.
- Died: May 16, 2009 (aged 83); Indiana Township, Allegheny County, Pennsylvania, U.S.
- Resting place: Saint Mary's Cemetery, Sharpsburg, Pennsylvania, U.S.
- Occupation: Entrepreneur
- Political party: Democratic
- Spouse: Josephine (m. 1950; died 1996)

John Edward Connelly (August 12, 1925 – May 16, 2009) was an American entrepreneur. He founded the Gateway Clipper Fleet in Pittsburgh, Pennsylvania, pioneered riverboat casino gambling along the Mississippi River via his President Casinos empire and founded a fleet of ships operating out of Chelsea Piers in New York City. He was a member of the Democratic Party.

== Early life ==
Connelly was born on August 12, 1925, in Pittsburgh, Pennsylvania, according to some sources. His obituary stated simply that he was born in 1925.

== Pittsburgh businesses ==
=== Incentive marketing ===
In the early 1950s, he founded J. Edward Connelly in Pittsburgh, which pioneered the concept of incentive marketing, or giving away products at banks and supermarkets in order to attract business. He was called the father of the practice and was called to testify before Congress after merchants complained it was an unfair practice.

=== Gateway Clipper ===
While being treasurer of the Allegheny County Sanitary Authority which was cleaning up Pittsburgh rivers he came up with the concept of starting excursion boats to show that the rivers around Pittsburgh had been cleaned up. In 1958 he started the Gateway Clipper Fleet.

He acquired the Sheraton Hotel at Station Square in 1981.

In 1971, he was the Democratic nominee in a race to replace Representative Robert Corbett who had died in office. He lost to John Heinz.

== Riverboat expansion ==
=== Chelsea Piers in New York City ===
In 1983, Connelly acquired control of World Yacht, a dinner cruise company in New York City founded by Neil Heap and Peter Simonetta in 1969. Connelly got access to three berths in the Chelsea Piers and was instrumental in its redevelopment. He expanded the fleet to three boats. In 1988 World Yacht was purchased by Circle Line for $35 Million.

=== St. Louis, Missouri ===
In 1981, he acquired the largest excursion ship plying the Mississippi River—the SS Admiral in St. Louis, Missouri from Streckfus Steamers. He sold it to investors in 1982. He began managing it again in 1988 and reacquired it in 1990.

He also acquired the excursion boats Huck Finn and Becky Thacher as well as the Robert E. Lee floating restaurant. All of the boats formed a steamship row docked at the foot of the Gateway Arch.

== President Casinos ==
In 1990, Connelly acquired the President which was on the National Register of Historic Places in Davenport, Iowa. He also acquired the Blackhawk Hotel in downtown Davenport which is also on the National Register.

Iowa was the first state to legalize riverboat gambling in modern times and the President became one of the first casinos to open.

In 1992, he acquired the President Casino Broadwater Resort in Biloxi, Mississippi. It was the second casino on the Gulf Coast in Mississippi.

In 1992, Connelly formed President Casinos.

In 1993, he converted the Admiral in St. Louis to be one of the first casinos in Missouri after that state legalized gambling.

As a pioneer in gambling in three states, stock soared. Connelly held one-third of the company stock and he was worth $107 million. His total net worth of $370 million had him on the Forbes list of richest Americans. He entered the bidding to bring an expansion team to St. Louis after the St. Louis Cardinals left the city.

However, the stock soon plummeted as Illinois legalized riverboat gambling and more casino competition arose. Further complicating matters, the Great Flood of 1993 forced the lengthy closure of the casinos. By 1996 his share of stock was valued at $14.7 million.

His Mississippi efforts were challenged by Jack E. Pratt of the Pratt Hotel Corporation which said it had the rights to develop the Broadwater Resort. Although the case was dismissed, Connelly paid out $1 million. He sold the Iowa casino after Illinois legalized gambling on its side of the river.

In 1993 the company entered into an agreement with the St. Regis Mohawk Indian Tribe to develop a land-based casino in the Catskill Mountains in New York. It would lose $4.1 million on the project which was never built.

President Casinos entered into a planned casino in Gary, Indiana which fell through. It lost $11 million when a proposed casino in Philadelphia fell through. In 1995, it closed its money-losing casino in Tunica, Mississippi. The company pitched a casino plying the waters of New York City which never materialized.

The company ultimately filed for Chapter 11 bankruptcy in 2002 and has now divested itself of all its gambling operations.

== Competency hearing ==
In 2006, Connelly was the subject of a family battle with his adoptive daughter Audree Wirginis to wrest control of the company on the basis of competence. He was ultimately removed as chairman of his companies.

== Philanthropies ==
In the early 1990s, Connelly pledged $13 million of the $20 million required to build the Domus Sanctae Marthae, a hotel at the Vatican where cardinals and other dignitaries would stay on visits to the Vatican, and where they stay during the election of Popes. When he made the pledge, his shares of President Casinos were worth $107 million. By 1996, his share of stock was valued at $14.7 million. Connelly cut the pledge to $7 million and received a contract to exclusively sell reproductions of Vatican art in the United States. The deal was eventually halted after he could not market the art beyond Pittsburgh.

His donations to Saint Louis University resulted in the school renaming the main dividing street for the campus from "West Pine Mall Boulevard" to "John E. Connelly Mall".

== Death and legacy ==
Connelly died of congestive heart failure on May 16, 2009, at his home in Indiana Township, Pennsylvania, north of Pittsburgh. He was survived by a sister and a brother, a daughter and three sons, and 13 grandchildren. Connelly's wife, Josephine, whom he had married in 1950, died in 1996.
