= Gateway Clipper Fleet =

Fleet of riverboats

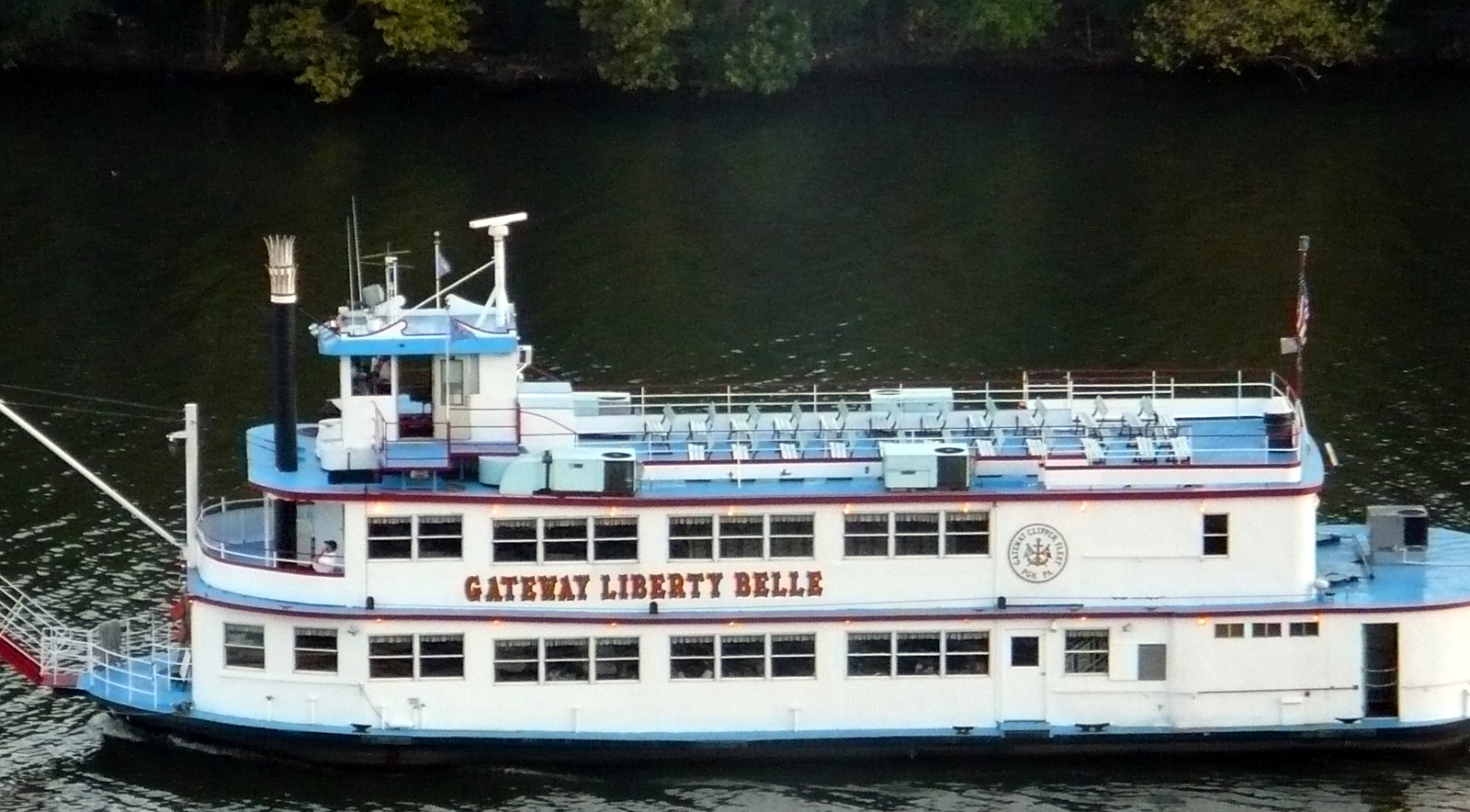
The Gateway Clipper fleet's PS Duchess

The Gateway Clipper Fleet, founded by John E. Connelly, is a Pittsburgh, Pennsylvania-based fleet of riverboats. The fleet cruises the three rivers of Pittsburgh - the Monongahela, Allegheny, and Ohio. The fleet is named after the city of Pittsburgh, which in earlier times was known as the "Gateway to the West". The original riverboat was Gateway Clipper, which set sail in 1958. By the mid-1960s, the fleet was composed of three craft, Gateway Clipper, Party Liner, and Good Ship Lollipop. In 1999 it added its fifth ship. In 2008 the Gateway Clipper Fleet celebrated its 50th year of sailing on the Three Rivers. In 2013, the fleet added its sixth ship, the all-steel classic paddle wheel Three Rivers Queen.

Today there are six ships in the fleet:

Ship name	Passenger capacity	Size (length vs width in feet)	Year joined the fleet	Former name(s)	Notes
Majestic	1,000	227 X 50	1987	n/a	fleet flagship, houses main kitchen for entire fleet
Empress	600	212 X 50	1966	Party Liner	a barge pushed by a towboat named the Empress II
Princess	400	120 X 35	1999	Keystone Belle	all-steel traditional paddlewheel with floor-to-ceiling windows
Three Rivers Queen	338	110 X 32	2013	Arkansas Queen	3-deck paddlewheel built in 1994
Duchess	310	125 X 35	1975	Liberty Bell	built in 1965, now carries most "Good Ship Lollipop" named cruises
Countess	150	55 X 14	1979	City of Champions; Good Ship Lollipop	open air riverboat, fleet's fastest ship

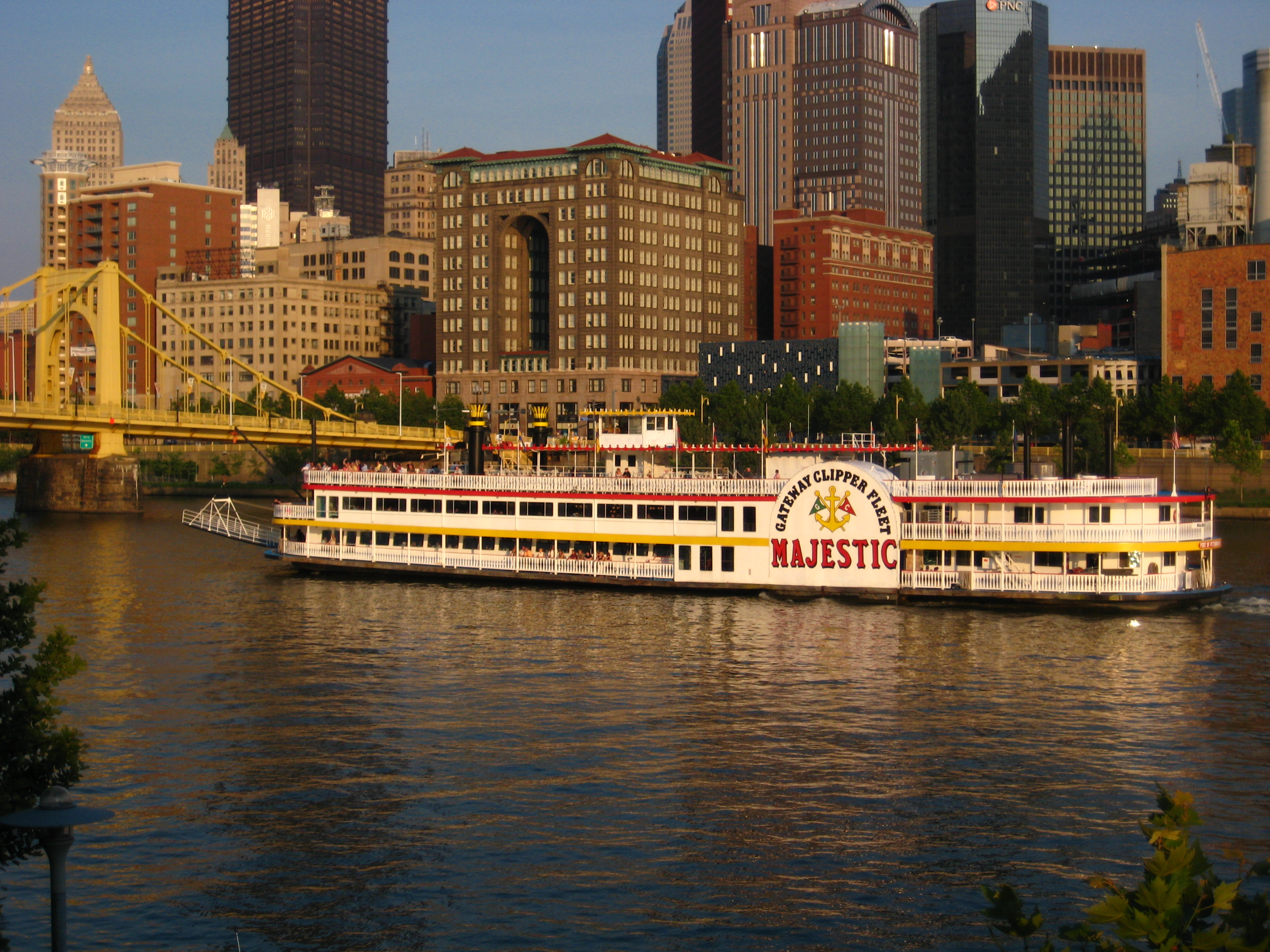
The Gateway Clipper fleet's PS Majestic

The Gateway Clipper Fleet offers many types of cruises, from sightseeing cruises and day trips for school groups to party and formal dinner cruises including wedding receptions. Shuttle service to PNC Park and Acrisure Stadium is available on days of Pittsburgh Pirates, Pittsburgh Steelers, and Pitt Panthers home games.

The fleet is believed to be the largest inland riverboat fleet in the United States.

The fleet was once moored at the Monongahela Wharf, but since the 1980s has been moored at Station Square, where the dock and loading bay are.
