= President (1924 steamboat) =

Historic American steamboat

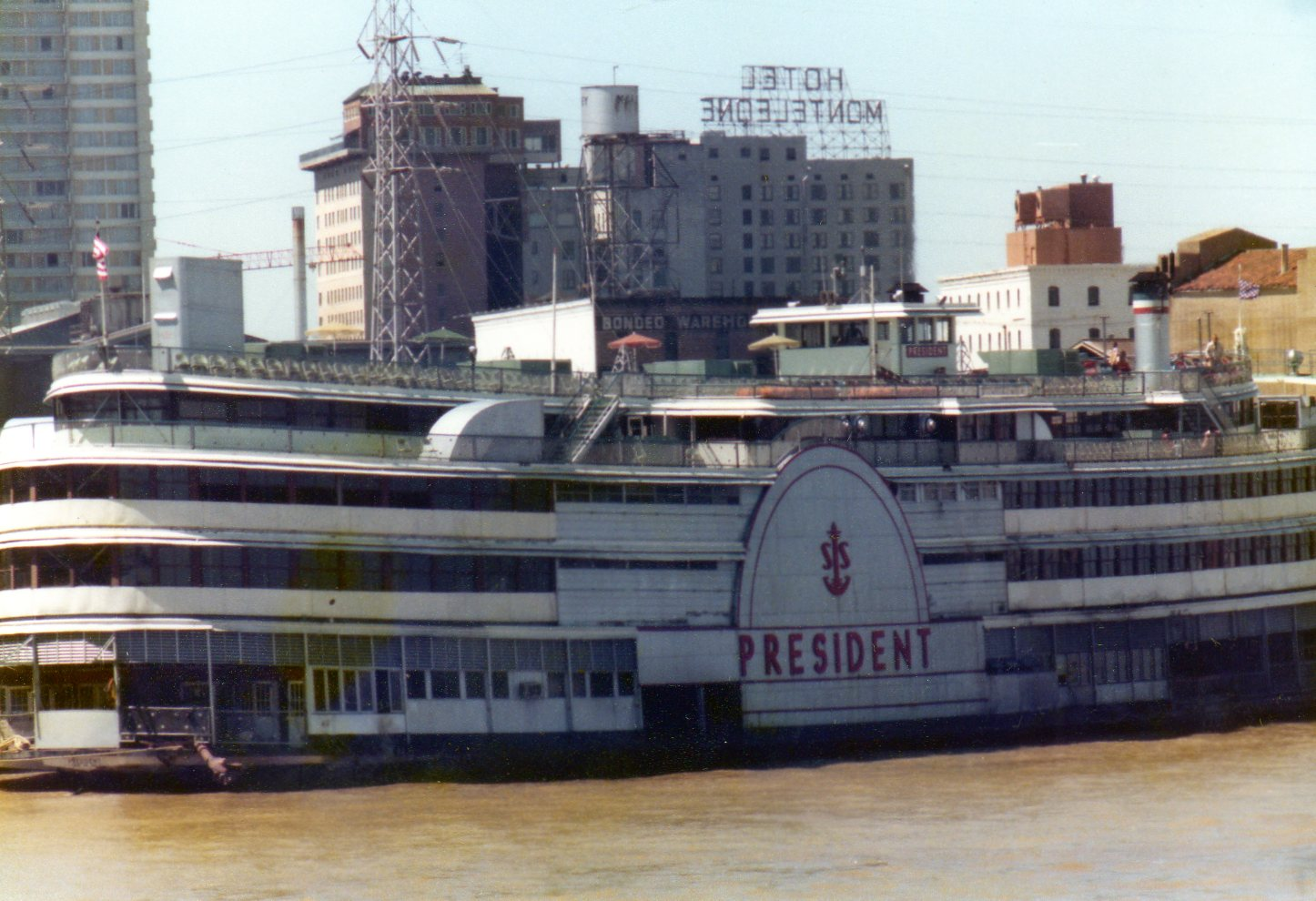
- The President at New Orleans, 1977

History
- Name: Cincinnati (1924); President (1933)
- Owner: Louisville & Cincinnati Packet Co. (1924–31); Streckfus Steamers (1931–87); Isle of Capri Casinos (1990–99)
- Operator: See owners
- Builder: Midland Barge Co. (Midland, PA)
- Cost: $417,000 ($7,800,000 today)
- Launched: February 3, 1923 (Cincinnati); July 1, 1933 (President)
- Completed: February 1924
- Maiden voyage: February 23, 1924
- In service: 1924–31; 1933–99
- Out of service: 1932; 1999–2009
- Identification: US registry #223580
- Fate: Dismantled, 2009

General characteristics
- Type: Packet steamboat (1924–31); Excursion steamboat (1933–87); Casino ship (1990–99)
- Tonnage: 1056 GRT, 866 NRT (Cincinnati); 978 GRT, 868 NRT (President)
- Length: 285 ft (87 m)
- Beam: 45 ft 7 in (13.89 m)
- Draft: 7 ft 3 in (2.21 m)
- Decks: 4 + Texas (Cincinnati); 5 (President) (Note: Both deck counts include the unenclosed promenade deck atop the topmost cabin deck.)
- Installed power: Steam engines; replaced by diesel 1978
- Propulsion: Sidewheels (orig.); Triple screw (1978)
- Speed: 15 mph (24 km/h) upstream; 19–23 mph (31–37 km/h) downstream
- Capacity: 350 passengers; 1,500 tons freight (Cincinnati); 3,100 passengers (President)
- PRESIDENT (Steamboat)
- Formerly listed on the U.S. National Register of Historic Places
- Former U.S. National Historic Landmark
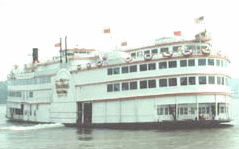
- Location: Effingham, Illinois
- Coordinates: 39.170796°N 88.519142°W
- Built: 1924
- Architect: Tom Dunbar (Cincinnati); Streckfus Steamers (President)
- NRHP reference No.: 89002460

Significant dates
- Added to NRHP: December 20, 1989
- Designated NHL: December 20, 1989
- Removed from NRHP: July 13, 2011
- Delisted NHL: July 13, 2011

President was a Mississippi River excursion steamboat. Originally the packet steamboat Cincinnati, she was built in 1924 and in the latter part of her career was the last remaining Western Rivers style sidewheel river excursion steamboat in the United States. She was listed on the National Register of Historic Places and declared a National Historic Landmark in 1989, although these designations were revoked in 2011. In 2009, she was dismantled and relocated to St. Elmo, Illinois, in a plan to rebuild her as a tourist attraction, but the plan failed. Her home ports were Cincinnati, Ohio; New Orleans, Louisiana; Vicksburg, Mississippi; St. Louis, Missouri; and Davenport, Iowa.

== History ==
Built in 1924 by the Midland Barge Company for John W. Hubbard of Pittsburgh and then known as Cincinnati, she was originally planned as an overnight packet boat which carried passengers and freight from Cincinnati, Ohio, to Louisville, Kentucky during the summer. Once the hull was in Cincinnati, the owners expanded the passenger capacity by building two cabin-decks. The operators, Louisville & Cincinnati Packet Company, ran excursions, making its maiden voyage downstream to New Orleans for Mardi Gras in 1924. They operated Mardi Gras excursions for consecutive years through 1930. Sometimes Cincinnati cruised upriver into the Pittsburgh area.

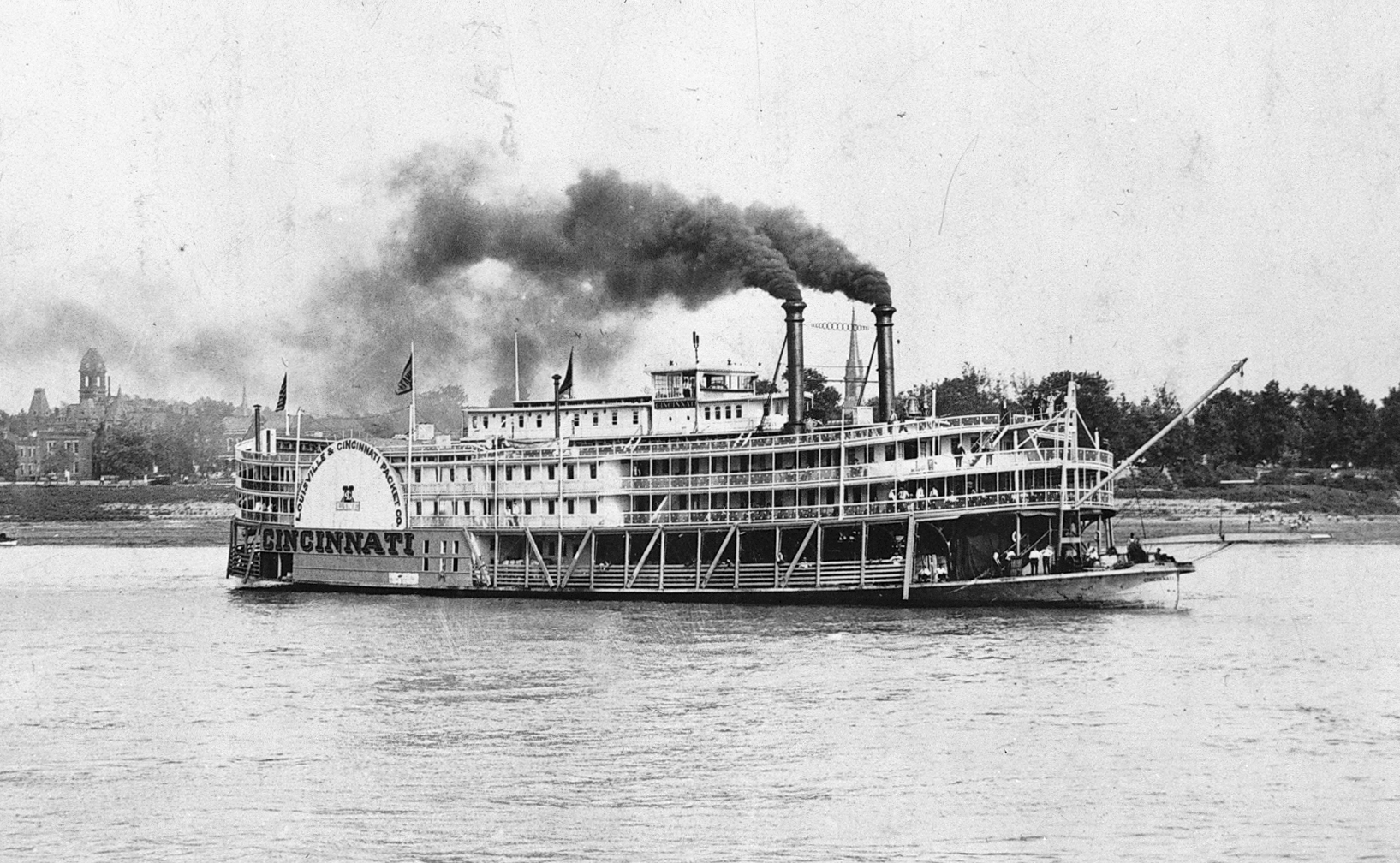
Cincinnati

Streckfus Steamers acquired the Cincinnati in 1931 and stripped it down to its hull. They refitted the hull with 24 watertight compartments, then built five decks encased within an all-steel superstructure. The company moved her to her new home port of St. Louis, Missouri, where she served the upscale excursion market. Renamed as President, the newly renovated 285-foot sidewheeler could accommodate 3,000 passengers and the ballroom could host 1,000 dancers. The cabins were built with an open design and the lido was built without a Texas deck.

Newly converted and newly named, she opened for business in 1933. Streckfus advertised her as "the New 5 Deck Luxury Super Steamer, Biggest and Finest On The Upper Mississippi". She continued tramping (having no fixed schedule or published ports of call) until 1941. (In 1940, she was displaced from her position as flagship of the Streckfus line by the S.S. Admiral.)

In 1941, she switched her home port to New Orleans. Because fuel oil was restricted and many of the young crewmen joined the armed forces with the nation's entry into World War II, tramping was discontinued, and the cruises stayed close to home. After the war, President remained in New Orleans for many years as a popular music venue, featuring concerts by national acts such as U2, Cyndi Lauper, Men at Work, The Little River Band, and The Producers, and performances by New Orleans artists like Dr. John, The Neville Brothers, and The Cold. She was also seen in the 1958 Elvis Presley film, King Creole, featured prominently during the opening credits but with the larger displayed name repainted near the sidewheel to read "SS New Orleans", as well as in the final scenes of the 1973 western My Name is Nobody cruising up-river.

In 1978, since wind made it difficult to maneuver the big boat, her two side wheels were removed and replaced with 1,000 horsepower (750 kW) diesel engines.

Sometime after October 1987, she was sold and returned to St. Louis as her new home port. While there, she was listed on the National Register of Historic Places and designated a National Historic Landmark on December 20, 1989.

On July 27, 2011, the Department of the Interior issued a press release that included the following line; "Finally, President, a steamboat in St. Elmo, Illinois, had its designation as a National Historic Landmark withdrawn because of a loss of historic integrity." The ship was also removed from the National Register entirely.

== Casino ==
In 1990, President sailed her last dinner and dancing cruise before undergoing a ten million dollar renovation and conversion into a floating casino. She was purchased by what was later known as Isle of Capri Casinos. In 1991, Iowa legalized riverboat gambling and the President opened in Davenport, Iowa, with 27,000 square feet (2,500 m^{2}) of gaming space. She was the second riverboat casino in the United States in modern times (opening 30 minutes after the first riverboat casino the M/V Diamond Lady opened in Bettendorf, Iowa, which was owned by Bernie Goldstein).

== Retirement and dismantling ==
President retired from service in 1999 and was reported, in 2004, to be located on the Yazoo River in Mississippi. At that time, she was for sale by Isle of Capri Casinos. She was also located for a time at Treasure Island in Lake McKellar at Memphis, Tennessee.

In January 2009, President was located in Alton, Illinois, where she had been listed by the National Park Service as of November 2007. She was disassembled and moved in pieces to St. Elmo, Illinois, near Effingham. Although local businesspeople planned to re-assemble her as a non-floating tourist attraction and hotel, financing was not secured and the plan failed.

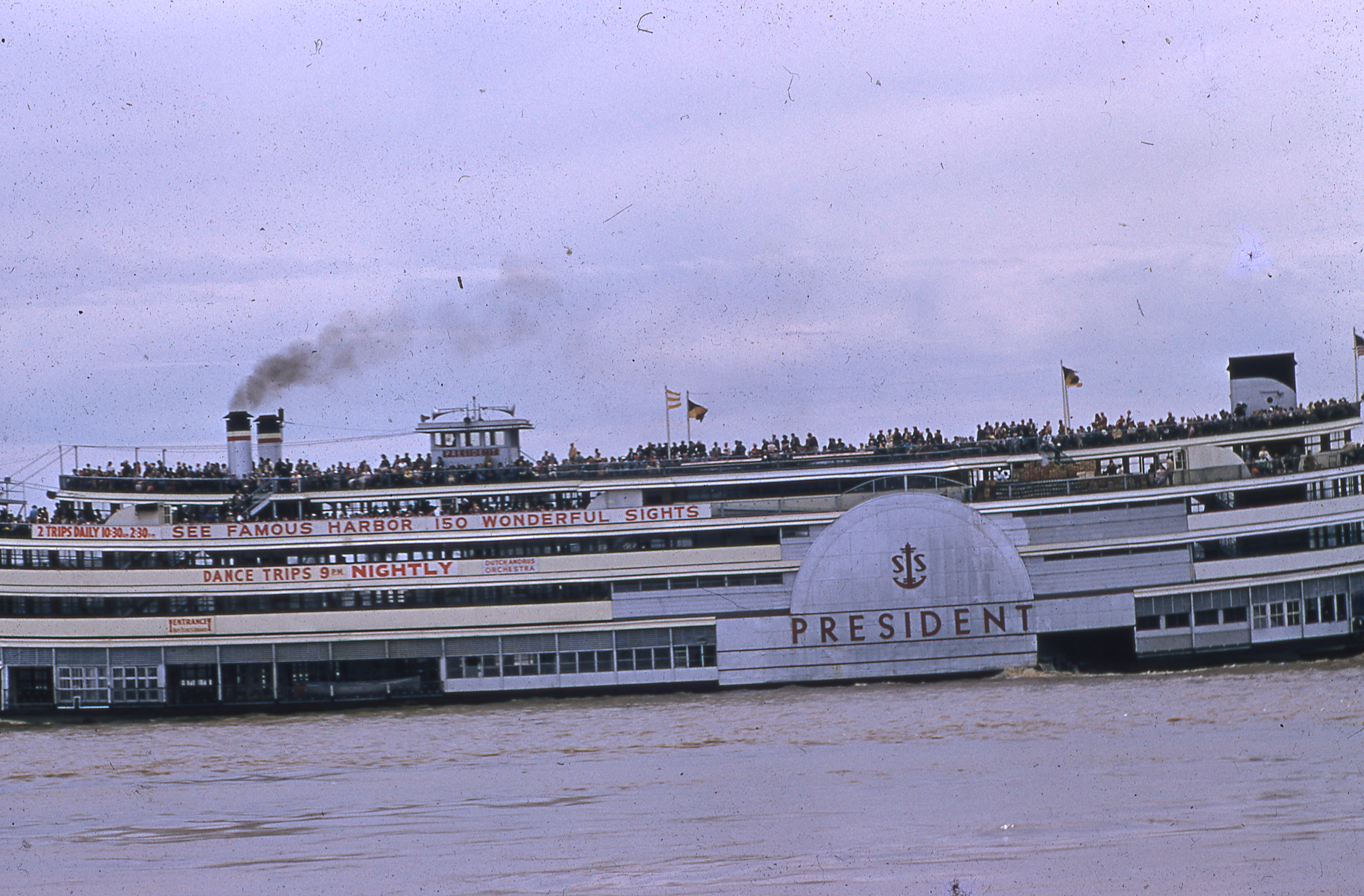
Photo by Robert M. Fuller – c. 1950s. One banner advertises two trips daily at 10:30 a.m. and 2:30 p.m.; another mentions that the orchestra led by (New Orleans trumpeter) Dutch Andrus (1912–1989) plays for dance trips nightly at 9:00 p.m.

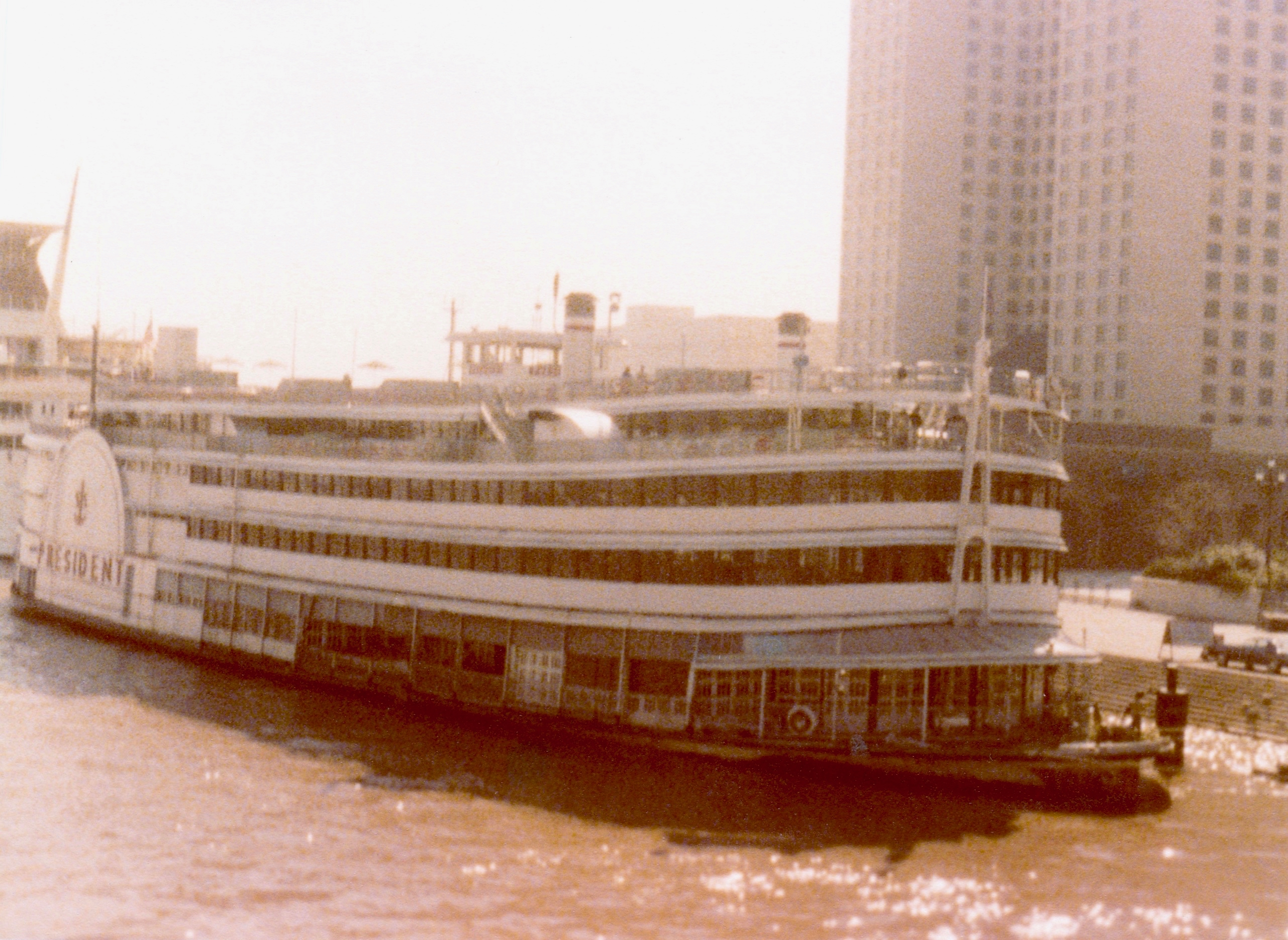
The President in New Orleans, 1979

== See also ==
- List of U.S. National Historic Landmark ships, shipwrecks, and shipyards
