= Admiral (disambiguation) =

Admiral is the rank, or part of the name of the ranks, of the highest naval officers.

Admiral may also refer to:

== Companies ==
- Admiral (electrical appliances), a brand of electrical appliances
  - Admiral Overseas Corporation (AOC), a former subsidiary
- Admiral (gambling), a British high street gambling chain
- Admiral Administration, a hedge fund administrator
- Admiral Cruises, a former subsidiary of Royal Caribbean
- Admiral Group, a motor insurance company based in Cardiff, Wales
  - Admiral Insurance, part of the Admiral Group
- Admiral Sportswear, a British sportswear brand

== Films ==
- Admiral (2008 film), a Russian historical film about Alexander Kolchak
- The Admiral: Roaring Currents, a 2014 South Korean film
- Isoroku (film), also known as The Admiral and Admiral Yamamoto, a 2011 Japanese film
- Michiel de Ruyter (film), a 2015 Dutch film released internationally under the title Admiral

== People ==
=== Given name or nickname ===
- Admiral Bailey, Jamaican dancehall deejay
- Admiral Dewey Larry (born 1958), American football player
- Admiral Muskwe (born 1998), Zimbabwean footballer
- Admiral Schofield (born 1997), American basketball player
- Jack Nimitz (1930–2009), American jazz saxophonist nicknamed "The Admiral"
- David Robinson (born 1965), American basketball player nicknamed "The Admiral"

=== Surname ===
- Jan l'Admiral (1699–1773), Dutch engraver
- Kevin Admiral, United States Army brigadier general
- Virginia Admiral (1915–2000), American painter and poet, mother of actor Robert De Niro

== Places ==
- Admiral, Saskatchewan, a hamlet in Canada
- North Admiral, Seattle, sometimes simply called Admiral or the Admiral district, a neighborhood in Seattle, Washington, United States

== Ships ==
- Admiral-class battlecruiser, a class of Royal Navy ships, of which only HMS Hood was completed
- Admiral-class ironclad, a class of six Royal Navy ships
- USS Admiral, three ships of the United States Navy
- SS Admiral (1890), a steamship that was renamed Rosalind in 1902
- SS Admiral (1899), a Great Lakes steamer that sank in Lake Erie in 1942
- SS Admiral (1905), a steamship that was renamed Lourenço Marques in 1916
- SS Admiral (1907), a Mississippi riverboat that was scrapped in 2011

== Sports ==
- Admiral Vladivostok, a Russian ice hockey team
- Admiral F.C., a Kenyan association football team
- Admiral's Cup, an international yachting regatta
- Amsterdam Admirals, a defunct American football team from Amsterdam
- Milwaukee Admirals, an American Hockey League franchise
- Mobile Admirals, a professional American football team in 1999
- Norfolk Admirals (AHL), an American Hockey League franchise
- Norfolk Admirals (ECHL), an East Coast Hockey League team

== Other uses ==
- Admiral (train), a named passenger service of the Pennsylvania Railroad
- Opel Admiral, a German luxury car
- Admiral (butterfly) or Limenitis, a genus of butterflies
- Admiral (grape), another name for the German/Italian wine grape Trollinger
- Admiral (novel), a 2016 military science fiction novel by Sean Danker
- Admirals (philately), a series of definitive stamps issued in the British Commonwealth
- Admiral Apartments, a 1909 apartment building in Portland, Oregon, United States
- Admiral Theater, a landmark film theater in West Seattle, Washington
- Admiral Theatre, an adult venue in Chicago, Illinois

== See also ==
- Admiralty (disambiguation)
