= Admiralty Island (disambiguation) =

Admiralty Island or Admiralty Islands may refer to:

- Admiralty Island, an island in the Alexander Archipelago of Alaska, US
- Admiralty Islands, a group of 18 islands in the Bismarck Archipelago of Papua New Guinea
- New Holland Island, an artificial island also known as "Admiralty Island" in St. Petersburg, Russian Federation
- Qikiqtagafaaluk, the traditional name for Admiralty Island, an Arctic island south of Victoria Island in Nunavut, Canada
- The Admiralty Islands (Ontario), a group of islands in the Saint Lawrence River in Ontario, Canada

== See also ==
- Admiralty Group, also Admiralty Islands, a group of eight named rocky outcrops north of Lord Howe Island, New South Wales, Australia
- Admiralty (disambiguation)
- Admiral (disambiguation)
