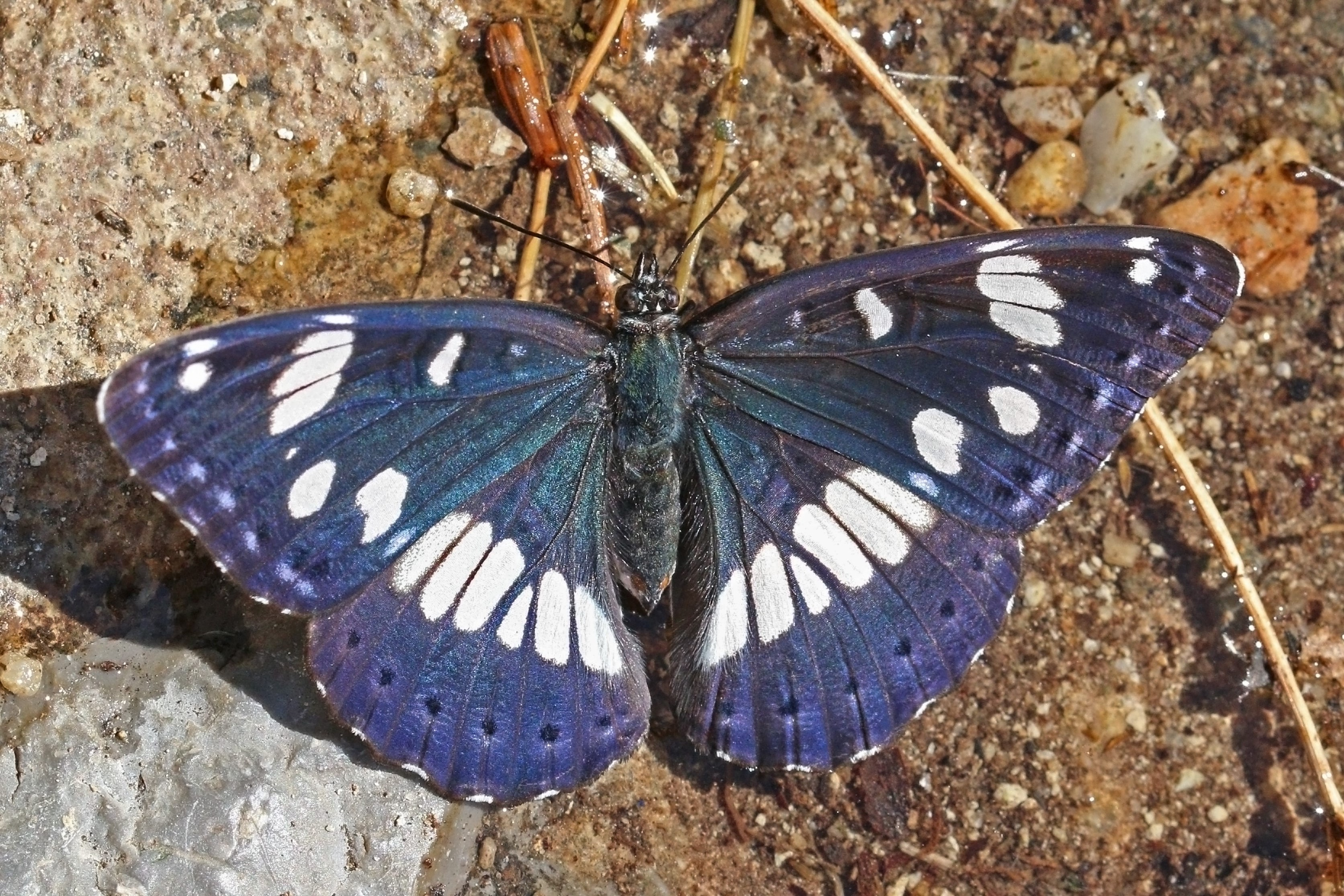
- Upperside, North Macedonia
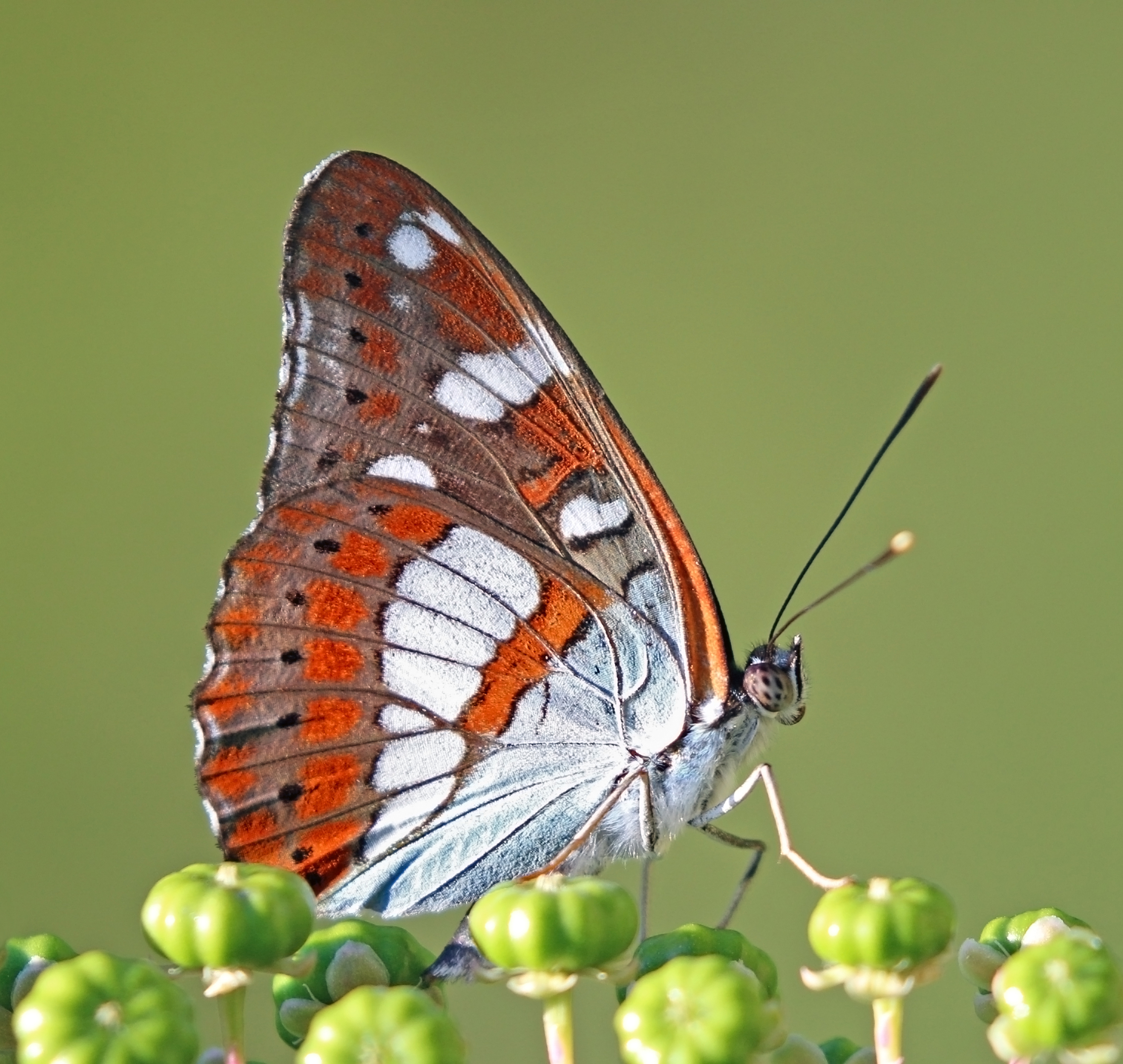
- Underside, Sithonia, Greece

Scientific classification
- Kingdom: Animalia
- Phylum: Arthropoda
- Class: Insecta
- Order: Lepidoptera
- Family: Nymphalidae
- Genus: Limenitis
- Species: L. reducta

Binomial name
- Limenitis reducta Staudinger, 1901

Synonyms
- List: Limenitis camilla Denis & Schiffermüller, 1775; Papilio lucilla Esper, 1778; Papilio drusilla Bergsträsser, [1779]; Papilio pythonissa Miller, 1859; Limenitis anonyma Lewis, 1872; Limenitis rivularis ab. tricolorata Grund, 1908; Limenitis camilla prodiga Fruhstorfer, 1909; Limenitis bifasciata Niepelt, 1914; Limenitis rufopunctata Lucas, 1923; Limenitis primigenia Verity, 1924; Limenitis rivularis r. pygmaeana Verity, 1928; Papilio schiffemülleri Higgins, 1933; Limenitis hypererythra Verity, 1950; Limenitis monorufopunctata Verity, 1950; Limenitis viridescens Verity, 1950; Limenitis violascens Verity, 1950; Limenitis mirzajani Gross & Ebert, 1975

= Limenitis reducta =

Species of butterfly

Limenitis reducta, the southern white admiral, is a butterfly of the family Nymphalidae.

== Subspecies ==
- Limenitis reducta reducta Staudinger, 1901
- Limenitis reducta herculeana Stichel, 1909

== Distribution and habitat ==
This species can be found in central and southern Europe (northern Iberia, southern and eastern France, Italy, the Balkans, and the Alps), in Western Asia, in Syria, the Caucasus and Iran. These butterflies live in light woodland, in woodland glades and in forest edge, at an elevation of 0–1,650 metres (0–5,413 ft) above sea level.

== Description ==
Limenitis reducta has a wingspan of 46–54 mm. The upperside of the wings is brown black with metallic blue shine, large transversal band of white markings and a submarginal line of small blue dots. The blue sheen varies with the angle of light. The ground colour of underside of the hindwings is red, with a silvery basal area, a row of white markings and a row of black spots. A few white cell spots are also present on the underside of the forewings. The caterpillars can reach a length of 27 millimetres (1.1 in). They are light green to dull green on the back, red brown on the underside. On the back there are numerous brown thorns.

This species is rather similar to Limenitis camilla, Neptis rivularis and Araschnia levana f. prorsa.

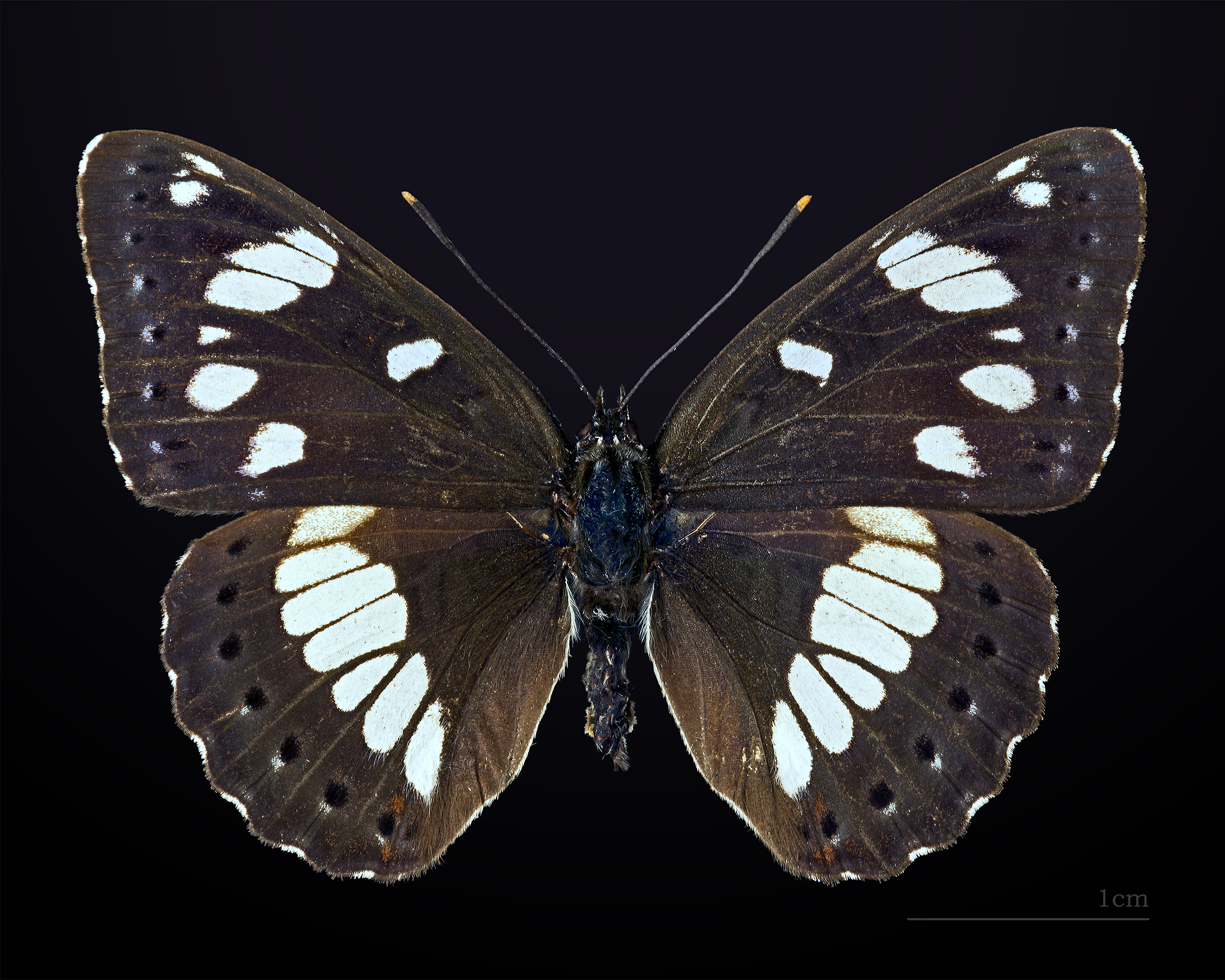
Dorsal side

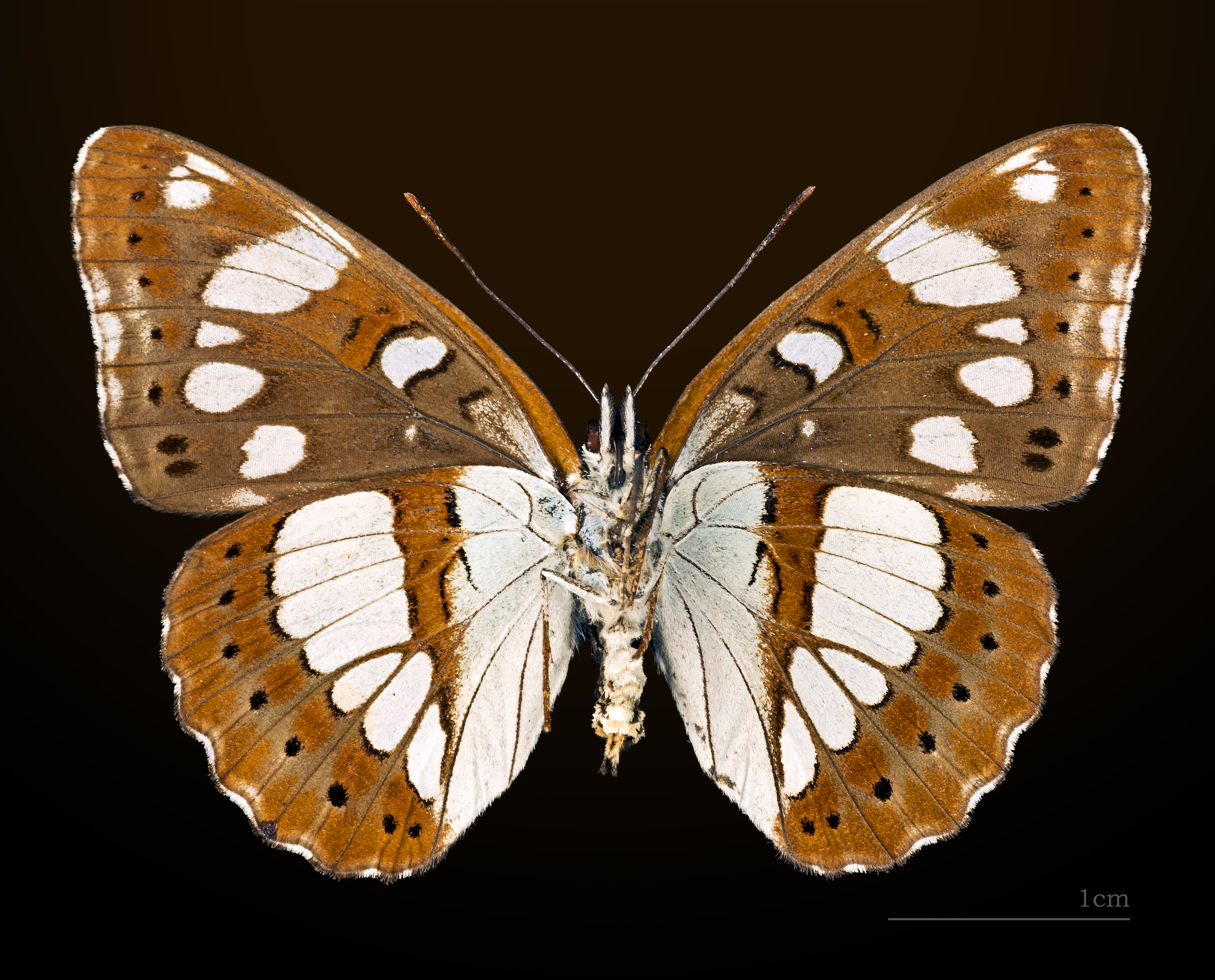
Ventral Side

== Biology ==
This species may have one or more generations, depending on the location. The butterfly flies from May to August depending on the location. Larvae feed on honeysuckle (Lonicera periclymenum, Lonicera etrusca, Lonicera implexa, Lonicera xylosteum, Lonicera alpigena, Lonicera nummulariifolia and Lonicera caprifolium). Adults usually feed on nectar of a wide range of herbaceous and arboreal flowers, but also visit fallen fruits, dung, aphid secretions and mineralised moisture from damp ground.

== Bibliography ==
- Boulard (Michel), 1988.- Note sur la pariade du Sylvain azuré (Lep. Nymphalidae). Alexanor, 15 (3), 1987 (1988): 156–158.
- D.J. Carter & B. Hargreaves - Guide des chenilles d'Europe - Delachaux & Niestlé, 2012, (ISBN 9782603018460)
- Josef Settele, Roland Steiner, Rolf Reinhardt, Reinart Feldmann: Schmetterlinge. Die Tagfalter Deutschlands., Eugen Ulmer KG, 2005, ISBN 3-800-14167-1
- Tom Tolman, Richard Lewington - Guide des papillons d'Europe et d'Afrique du Nord, Delachaux & Niestlé, Paris 1997 - (ISBN 978-2-603-01649-7)
