= Admiralteysky =

Admiralteysky, Admiralteyskaya or Admiralteyskoye may refer to:

== Places ==
- Admiralteysky District, a district of Saint Petersburg, Russia
- Admiralteysky Municipal Okrug, a municipal okrug of Admiralteysky District of Saint Petersburg, Russia
- Admiralteyskaya (Saint Petersburg Metro), a station of the Saint Petersburg Metro, Saint Petersburg, Russia
- Admiralty Embankment (Admiralteyskaya naberezhnaya), a street along the Neva River in Saint Petersburg, Russia

== See also ==
- Admiralty (disambiguation)
- Novo-Admiralteysky Bridge, a planned bridge in Saint Petersburg, Russia
