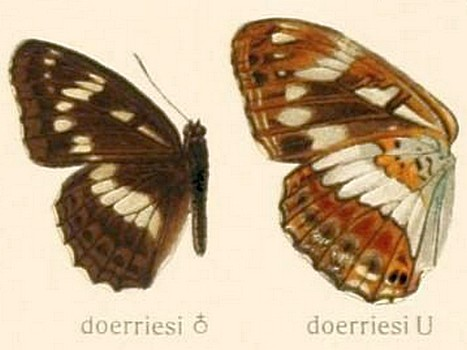
- Limenitis doerriesi in Seitz 57b male only the depicted female is Limenitis helmanni ab.duplicata Staudinger

Scientific classification
- Domain: Eukaryota
- Kingdom: Animalia
- Phylum: Arthropoda
- Class: Insecta
- Order: Lepidoptera
- Family: Nymphalidae
- Genus: Limenitis
- Species: L. doerriesi

Binomial name
- Limenitis doerriesi Staudinger, 1892

= Limenitis doerriesi =

Species of butterfly

Limenitis doerriesi is a butterfly found in the East Palearctic (Amur (Khabarovsk), Ussuri, Northeast China, Korea) that belongs to the browns family.

== Description from Seitz ==
L. doerriesi Stgr. (57b only male* [the depicted female is Limenitis helmanni ab.duplicata Staudinger] ), 61d female (see gallery)) is so extremely similar to the preceding [L. helmanni] that there is justification for doubting the specific distinctness. It has at the apex of the cell of the forewing a feeble reddish brown stripe (not represented in the figure), there being in the female occasionally also a reddish spot anteriorly in the centre of the cell. Near the distal margin of both wings, contiguous to a row of sharply marked small black spots, there are mostly also white elongate spots (absent from the figure of the male), which are not present in the anterior area of the forewing, but may be considerably enlarged at the centre of the distal margin. The white spots situated between the median veins of the forewing stand somewhat nearer the middle of the wing than in duplicata [form of L. helmanni] . The inner edge of the while band on the underside of the hindwing is said to afford an essential difference from duplicata. This edge in doerriesi projects below the subcostal somewhat towards the distal margin, and is here as well as between the radials quite straight or feebly undulate (concave towards the base), while in duplicata the brownish portion of the basal area projects twice in arc-shape into the respectivewhite spots of the band. In the male the rest of the underside is almost as in duplicata, the white band, however, is somewhat narrower and there are distinct black dots in the grey spots of the marginal area. In the rather larger female the outer area of the underside is more evenly ochreous, with white marginal lunules and a row of small elongate white spots in a narrow grey band; before each of these spots there is a black dot, the anal angle as in the male bearing a double dot. Amurland: Sutshan (Ussuri).

== Biology ==
The larva feeds on Lonicera praeflorens

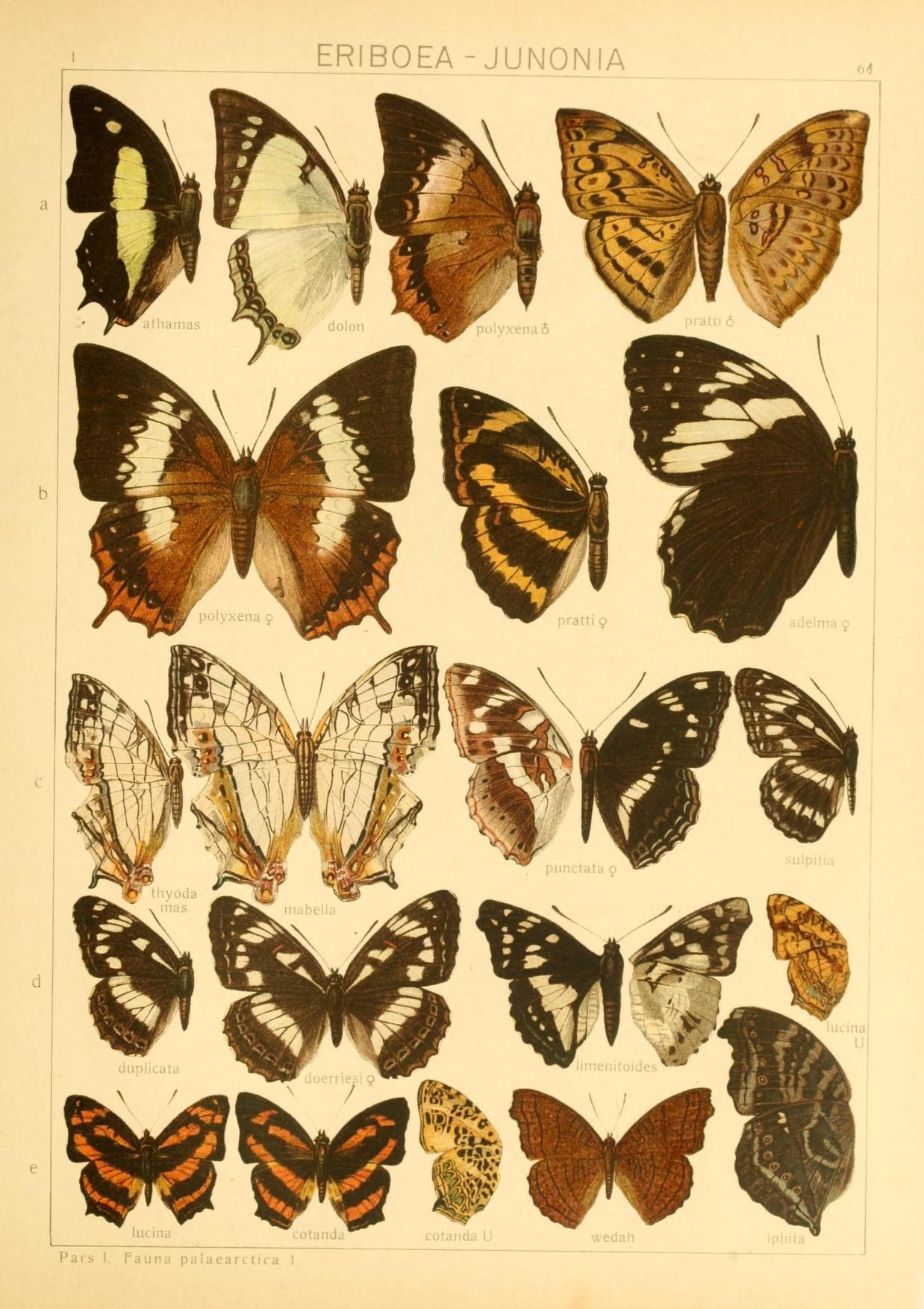
61 d female

== See also ==
- List of butterflies of Russia
