= CSS Admiral =

CSS Admiral has been the name of two Confederate States Navy ships of the American Civil War:

- CSS Admiral (1862), side-wheel river steamboat, captured by USS Alabama.
- CSS Admiral, side-wheel steamer renamed CSS Morgan, surrendered to the United States at the end of the war.

== See also ==
- USS Admiral
