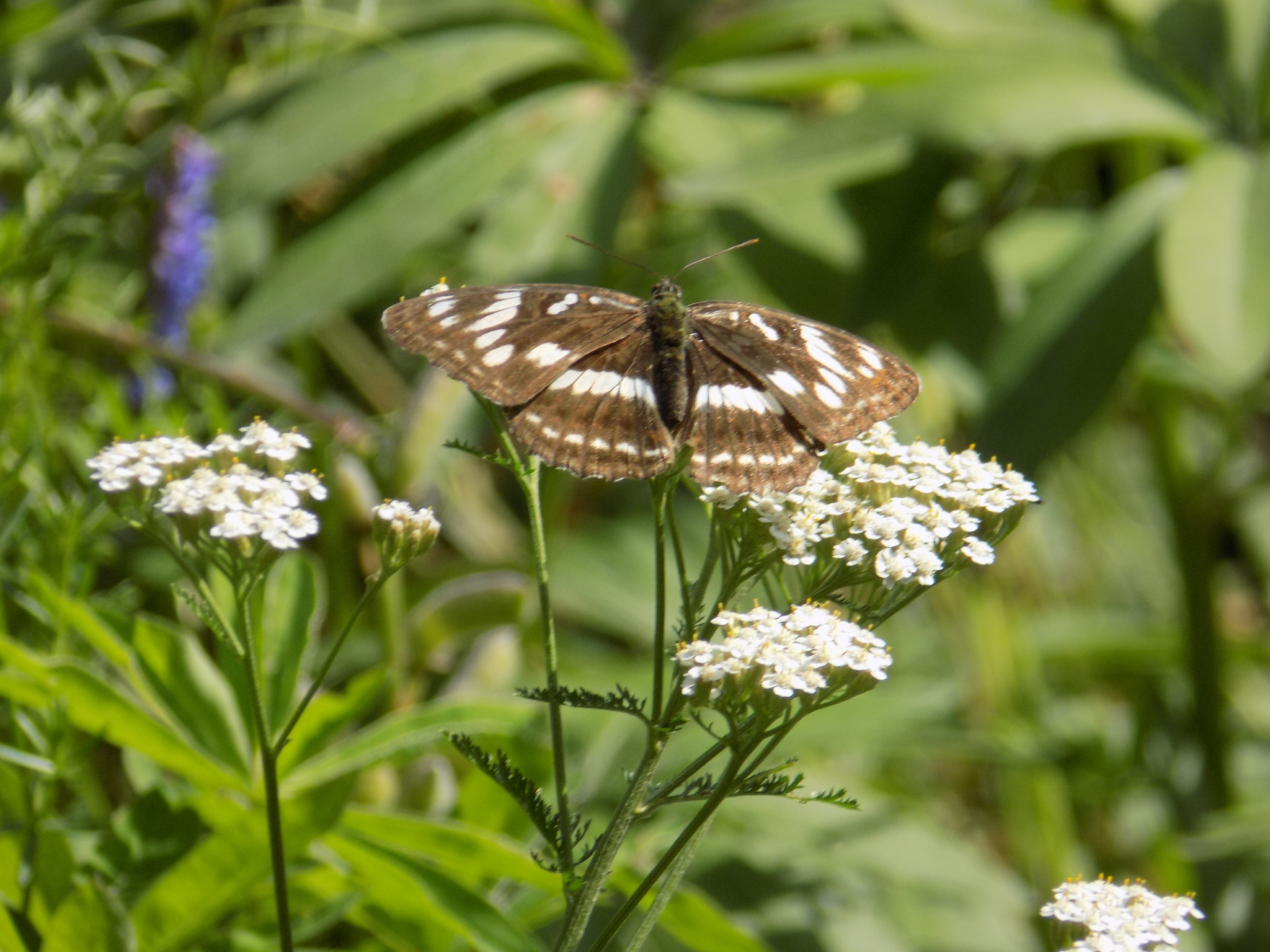

Scientific classification
- Kingdom: Animalia
- Phylum: Arthropoda
- Clade: Pancrustacea
- Class: Insecta
- Order: Lepidoptera
- Family: Nymphalidae
- Genus: Limenitis
- Species: L. sydyi

Binomial name
- Limenitis sydyi Lederer, 1853

= Limenitis sydyi =

Species of butterfly

Limenitis sydyi is a species of butterfly that belongs to the family of brush-footed butterflies (Nymphalidae). This species has been found distributed in Eurasia, in Russian Siberia and Mongolia.

== Habitat ==
This species is nemoral and prefers sparse-growth forests dominated by larch (Larix) and birch of the species Betula pendula (silver birch). These plants, and in association Limenitis sysyi, are commonly found occurring in second-order river valleys located at elevations of 400-600 meters. High humidity levels are critical to this species' life cycle, particularly during the months of May to June and September. Snow of a depth of 10-20 centimeters also seems to be important. Broader and narrower river valleys are only marginally suitable for this species.

=== Range expansion ===
Long-term field observations have shown that the range of Limenitis sydyi has expanded further into Siberia. It has become rather common in the city of Chita and its surroundings, along with the Republic of Buryatia.
