= USS Alabama (1850) =

Gunboat of the United States Navy

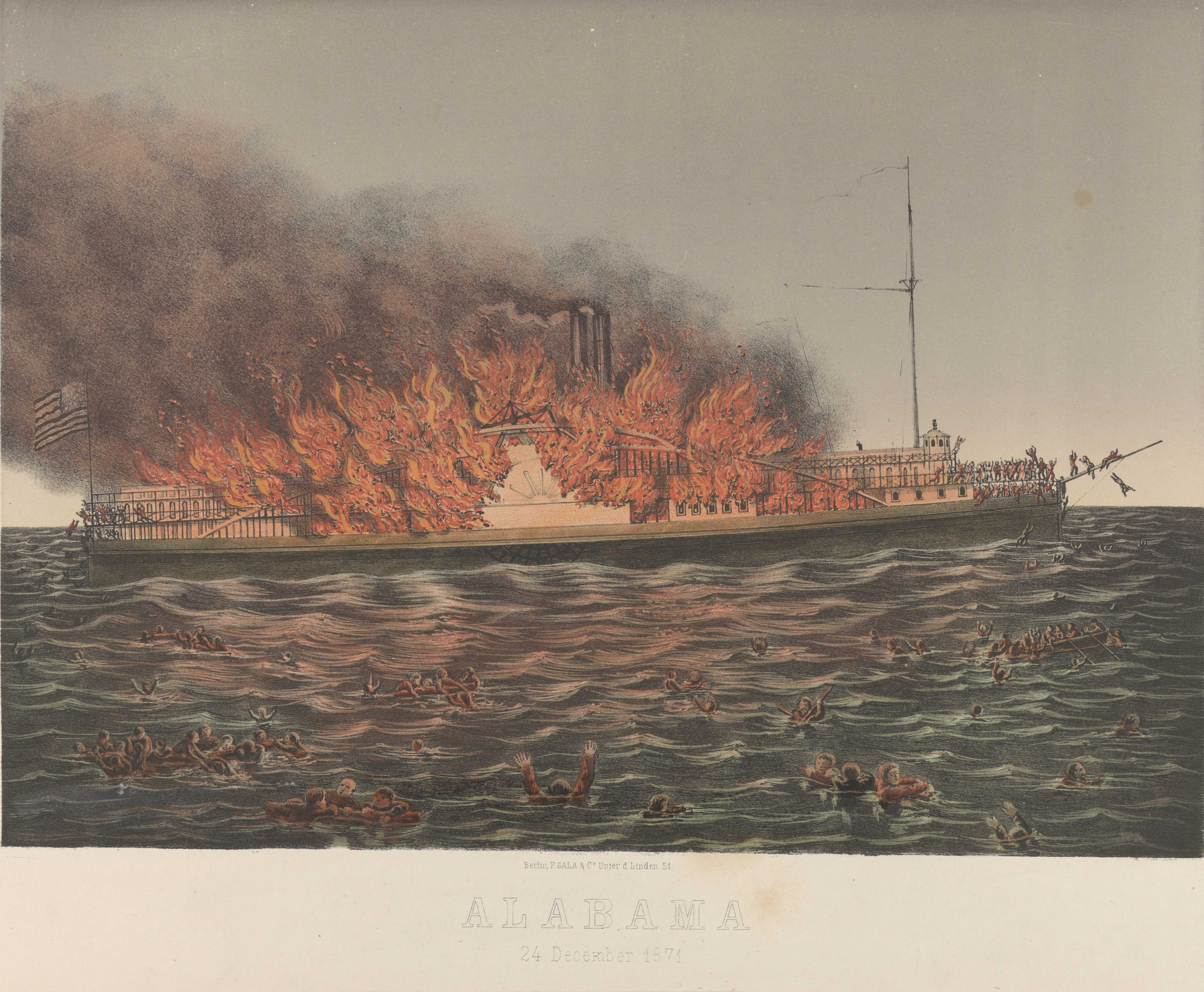
- Steamship Alabama on fire

History

United States
- Name: USS Alabama
- Namesake: Alabama
- Builder: William H. Webb in New York City
- Laid down: 1849
- Launched: 10 June 1850
- Acquired: August 1861
- Fate: Sold mid-July 1865; destroyed by fire in 1878

General characteristics
- Type: Steamer
- Displacement: 1,261 long tons (1,281 t)
- Length: 214 ft 4 in (65.33 m)
- Beam: 35 ft 2 in (10.72 m)
- Draft: 14 ft 6 in (4.42 m)
- Propulsion: steam
- Speed: 13 kn (24 km/h; 15 mph)
- Complement: 175
- Armament: eight 32-pounder smooth-bore

USS Alabama was a 1,261 long tons (1,281 t) wooden side-wheel steamer, built at New York City in 1850 and operated thereafter in commercial service in the western Atlantic.

== Civil War service ==
The U.S. Army used her as a transport during the spring and early summer of 1861, and she was purchased by the Navy at the beginning of August of that year for conversion to a warship. Commissioned as USS Alabama at the end of September 1861, in the next month she was attached to the large naval force preparing to seize Port Royal, South Carolina, for use as a base for blockading the southern seacoast. However, before that expedition reached its target area, she was detached and sent to patrol off Charleston, South Carolina. In December, Alabama took station along the Georgia coast, capturing the ship CSS Admiral there on the 12th.

For the rest of 1861 and most of 1862, Alabama continued to enforce the blockade. In February–March 1862, she took part in the occupation of coastal positions in Georgia and Florida, and later played a role in the capture of at least three blockade running schooners. Alabama was under repair in October–December 1862, after which she spent nearly seven months cruising in the West Indies area in search of Confederate commerce raiders. She was sent north in late July 1863 in an effort to control an outbreak of yellow fever among her crew and did not resume active service until May 1864.

Alabama served with the North Atlantic Blockading Squadron for the rest of the Civil War. While off the North Carolina coast in October 1864, she assisted in the destruction of the blockade runner Annie. Late in 1864 and in January 1865, Alabama supported the attacks that finally captured Fort Fisher, thus closing the port of Wilmington, North Carolina, as a source of supplies and commerce for the Confederate cause. During March and April 1865, she operated in the vicinity of Hampton Roads and on the James River, Virginia. Her final active service was performed cruising along the mid-Atlantic coast.

== Post war ==
Alabama was decommissioned at Philadelphia in mid-June 1865 and sold less than a month later. She soon resumed civilian employment, with no change in name, and remained in merchant service until destroyed by fire in 1878.
