= Admiralty Group =

Group of islands off the coast of Australia

Coordinates: 31.50°S 159.07°E

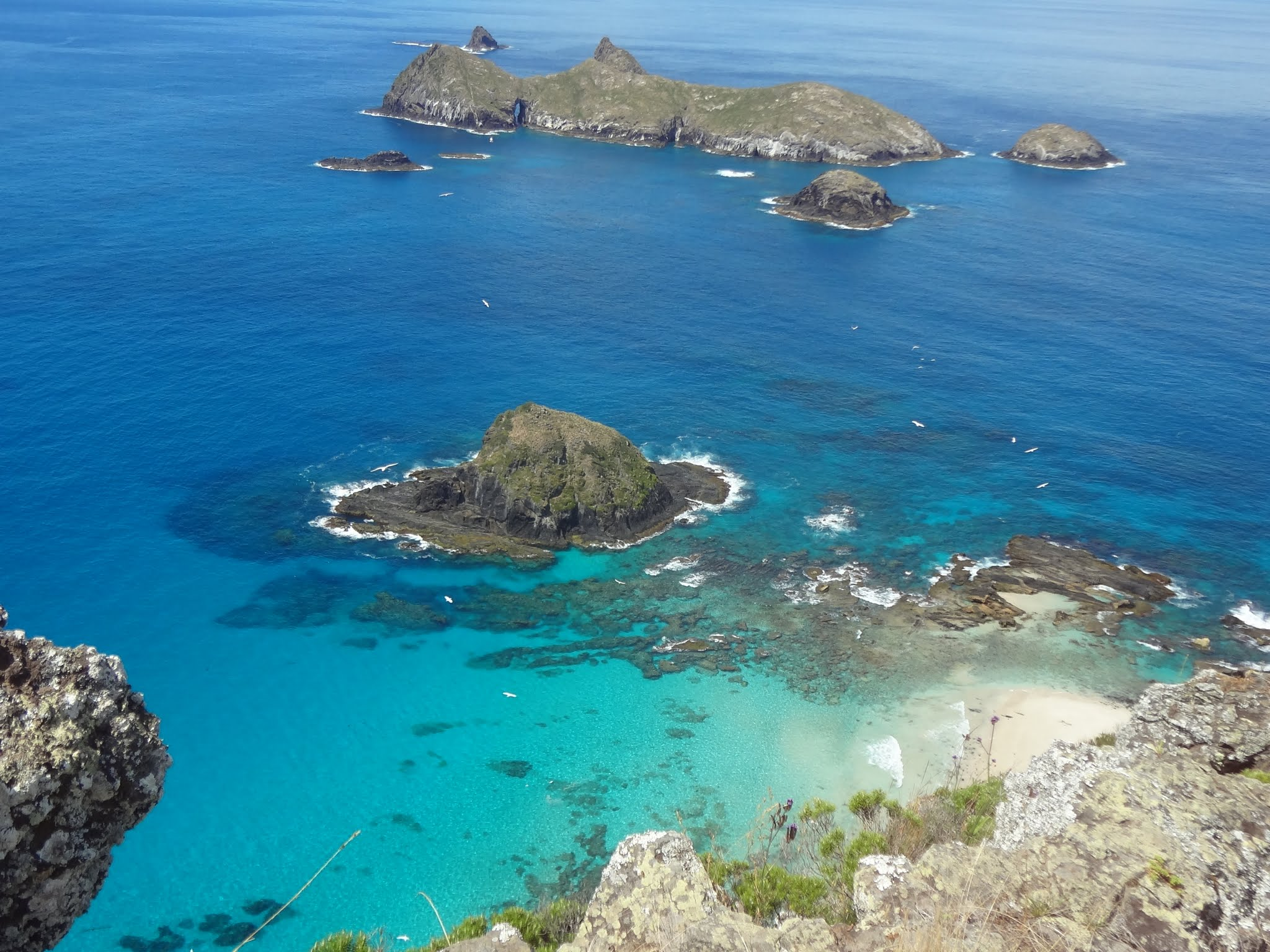
Admiralty Group of islets as seen from Lord Howe Island

The Admiralty Group is to the north of Lord Howe Island

The Admiralty Group of islets consists of eight rocky outcrops within 2 km of the north of Lord Howe Island. From south to north, these are:

1. Soldier’s Cap
2. Sugarloaf
3. South Island
4. Noddy
5. Roach Island
6. Tenth of June
7. North Rock
8. Flat Rock

Roach Island is the largest, being about 15 ha in area, 800 m long and 86 m in maximum height, with a much-photographed 15-metre-tall tunnel at its northern end. Basalt lava flows are crossed by many dikes. Vegetation consists of grasses, sedges and a few bushes.

The islets are noted in spring and summer for nesting populations of seabirds in greater numbers than anywhere on Lord Howe Island. These are mainly sooty terns, masked boobies and brown noddies.

Boat trips take visitors to Roach Island for a bird colony experience.

== See also ==
- Admiralty (disambiguation)

== Bibliography ==
- Hutton, Ian (1986). Lord Howe Island. Australian Capital Territory: Conservation Press. ISBN 978-0-908198-40-5.
