= Admiralty =

Admiralty most often refers to:

- Admiralty, Hong Kong
- Admiralty (United Kingdom), military department in command of the Royal Navy from 1707 to 1964
- The rank of admiral
- Admiralty law

Admiralty can also refer to:

== Buildings ==
- Admiralty, Trafalgar Square, a pub in London
- Admiralty, Saint Petersburg, Russia
- Admiralteyskaya (Saint Petersburg Metro), a metro station in Saint Petersburg, Russia, the name means "Admiralty"
- Admiralty Arch in London, England
- Admiralty House, London
- Admiralty House, Bermuda Admiralty House for Royal Navy’s North American Station 1795-1956
- Admiralty House, Sydney
- Dutch Admiralty, a group of follies at Tsarskoye Selo, Russia
- Former Admiralty House, Singapore
- Naval Museum of Halifax, housed at Admiralty House for Royal Navy’s North American Station 1819-1905

== Law ==
- Admiralty court
- Admiralty law, also called Maritime Law
- Amirauté (New France)

== Naval organizations ==
- Admiralty (navy), a governmental and/or naval body responsible for the administration of a navy

=== Germany ===
- German Imperial Admiralty, Kaiserliche Admiralität
- German Imperial Admiralty Staff, Admiralstab

=== Netherlands ===
- Admiralty of Amsterdam
- Admiralty of Friesland
- Admiralty of the Noorderkwartier (also called the "Admiralty of West-Friesland")
- Admiralty of Rotterdam (also called the "Admiralty of de Maze")
- Admiralty of Zeeland

=== Russia ===
- Admiralty Board (Russian Empire), the authority responsible for the Imperial Russian Navy
  - Admiralty Shipyard, a former Imperial admiralty, the Main Admiralty, today a shipyard in Saint Petersburg, Russia

=== United Kingdom and earlier states ===
- Admiralty in the 16th century, the Admiralty and Marine Affairs Office (1546–1707)
- Board of Admiralty, the board responsible for the Royal Navy from 1628 to 1964
- Admiralty (United Kingdom), a former military department in command of the Royal Navy from 1707 to 1964
- Admiralty Board (United Kingdom), the post-1964 board responsible for the Royal Navy
- Royal Maritime Auxiliary Service, commonly referred to as the Admiralty
- United Kingdom Hydrographic Office, produces the Admiralty brand of charts

== Places ==
- Admiralty Bay (disambiguation), multiple bodies of water
- Admiralty, Hong Kong, an urban area on Hong Kong Island named after the naval base HMS Tamar
  - Admiralty station (MTR), the MTR station serving the area
- Admiralty, Singapore, a suburban neighbourhood in Singapore
  - Admiralty MRT station, the MRT station serving the area
- Admiralty Glacier, Queen Louise Land, Greenland
- Admiralty Inlet, Washington, United States
- Admiralty Island, Alaska, United States
- Admiralty Islands, a part of the Manus Province of Papua New Guinea
- Admiralty Lake, a proglacial lake located in what is now Lake Ontario
- Admiralty Mountains in Victoria Land of Antarctica
- Qikiqtagafaaluk, formerly Admiralty Island, Nunavut, Canada

== Ships and shipping ==
- HMS Admiralty, the name of two yachts of the Royal Navy
- USS Admiralty Islands, a 1944 United States Navy aircraft carrier

== Other uses ==
- Admiralty brass, contains 30% zinc and 1% tin which inhibits dezincification in most environments
- Admiralty chart, a brand of nautical chart
- Admiralty scaffolding, a military barrier

== See also ==
- Admiral
- Admiralteysky (disambiguation)
