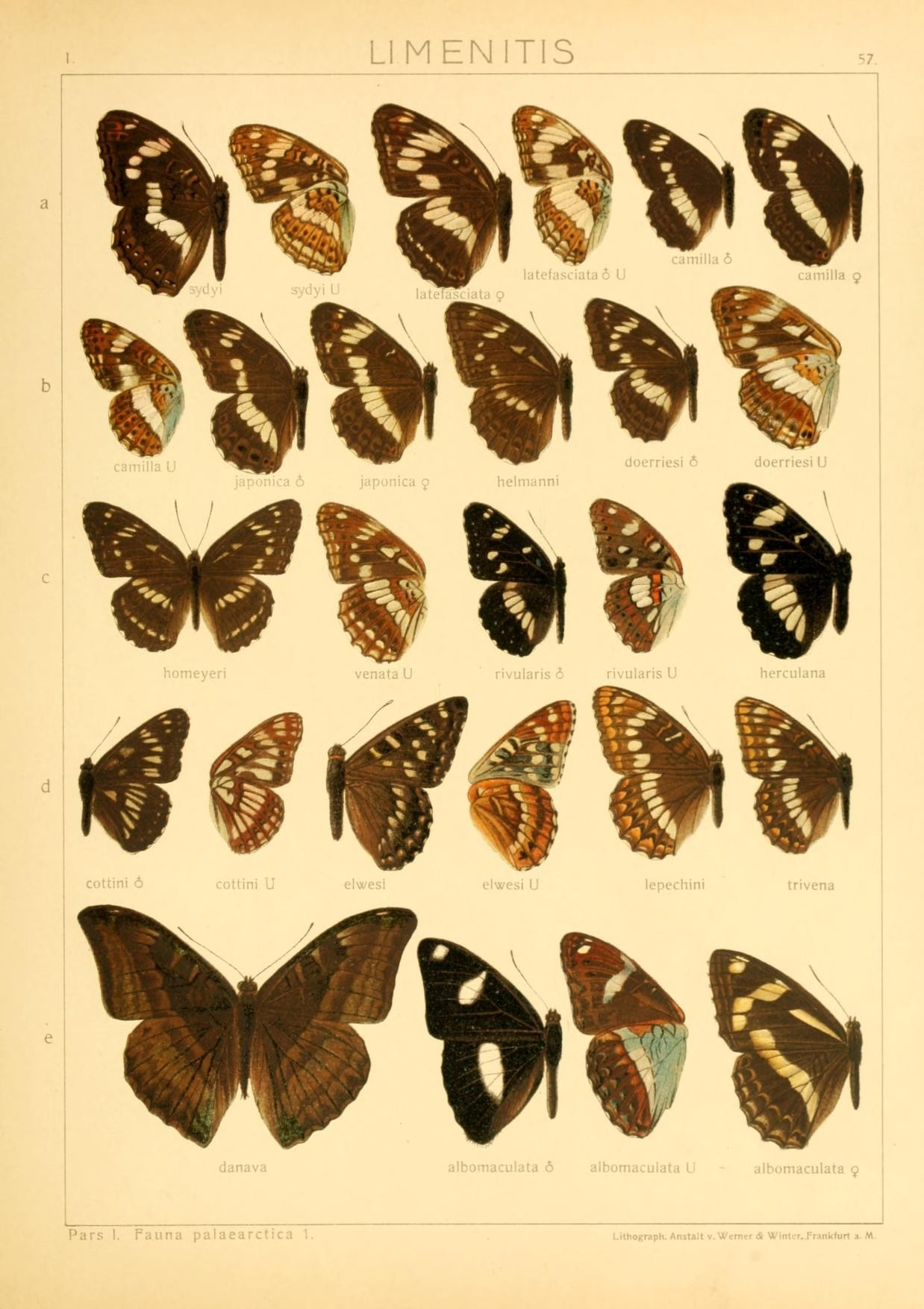
- Limenitis helmanni in Seitz 57b male and 57b underside of female, erroneously named doerriesi U.

Scientific classification
- Kingdom: Animalia
- Phylum: Arthropoda
- Clade: Pancrustacea
- Class: Insecta
- Order: Lepidoptera
- Family: Nymphalidae
- Genus: Limenitis
- Species: L. helmanni

Binomial name
- Limenitis helmanni Lederer, 1853

= Limenitis helmanni =

Species of butterfly

Limenitis helmanni is a butterfly found in the East Palearctic that belongs to the browns family.

== Subspecies ==
- Limenitis helmanni helmanni Zailiisky Altatau Mountains, Altai
- Limenitis helmanni pryeri (Moore, 1877) Chekiang
- Limenitis helmanni duplicata Staudinger, 1892 Amur, Ussuri, Northeast China, Korea
- Limenitis helmanni chosensis Matsumura, 1929 Korea
- Limenitis helmanni sichuanensis (Sugiyama, 1994) China (Shaanxi, Jiangxi)
- Limenitis helmanni meicunensis Yoshino, 2016 China (Fujian, Guangdong, Guangxi, Jiangxi)
- Limenitis helmanni misuji Sugiyama, 1994 Sichuan
- Limenitis helmanni wenpingae Huang, 2003 Yunnan

== Description from Seitz ==
L. helmanni Led. (57b) has the ground-colour blackish brown, the pattern being similar to that of the preceding species [Limenitis camilla; the cell of the forewing, however, bears a whitish basal streak followed distally by a white acutely triangular spot; the while spots of the central area are small and isolated, and the band of the hindwing, which is directed towards the centre of the hindmargin, is composed of separated spots. On the hindwing above there are sometimes small, whitish, elongate, submarginal spots. Central Asia: Altai, eastern districts of Amurland; West and Central China; Corea. — pryeri Moore is on an average larger, the white markings are widened, both wings have distinct while sumarginal spots, the underside is more strongly marked with more prominent white spots on the hindwing. North-East China (Ning-po), Ussuri, Amurland, Corea, Japan. — In duplicata Stgr. male 61d, 57b underside of female, erroneously named doerriesi U. on plate) the increase in the size of the white markings reaches its maximum; the band of the hindwing is continuous and of double or threefold width. Amurland).

== Biology ==
The larva feeds on Lonicera altaica, Lonicera tatarica, Lonicera maackii

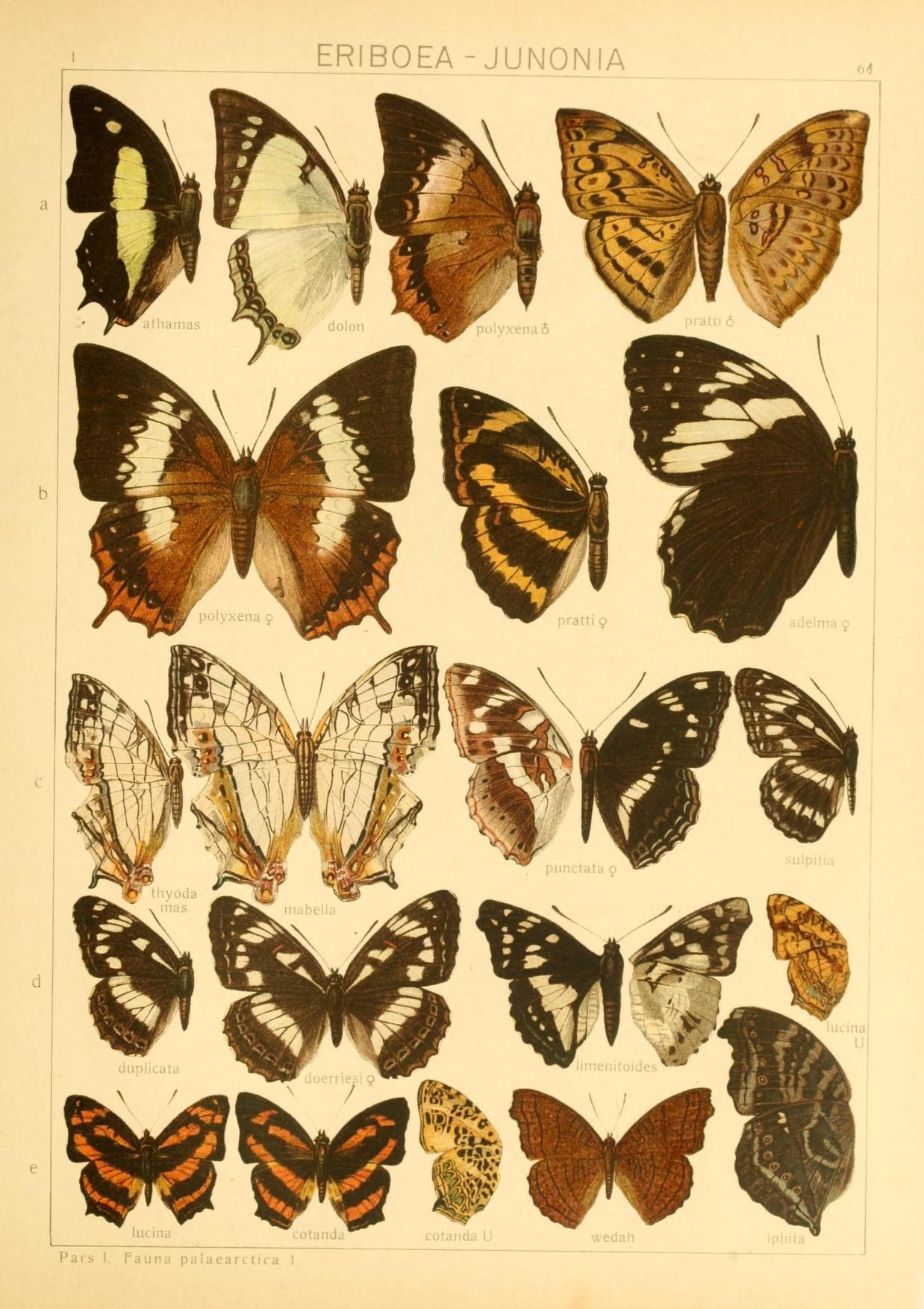
61 d ssp. duplicata Stgr. male

== See also ==
- List of butterflies of Russia
