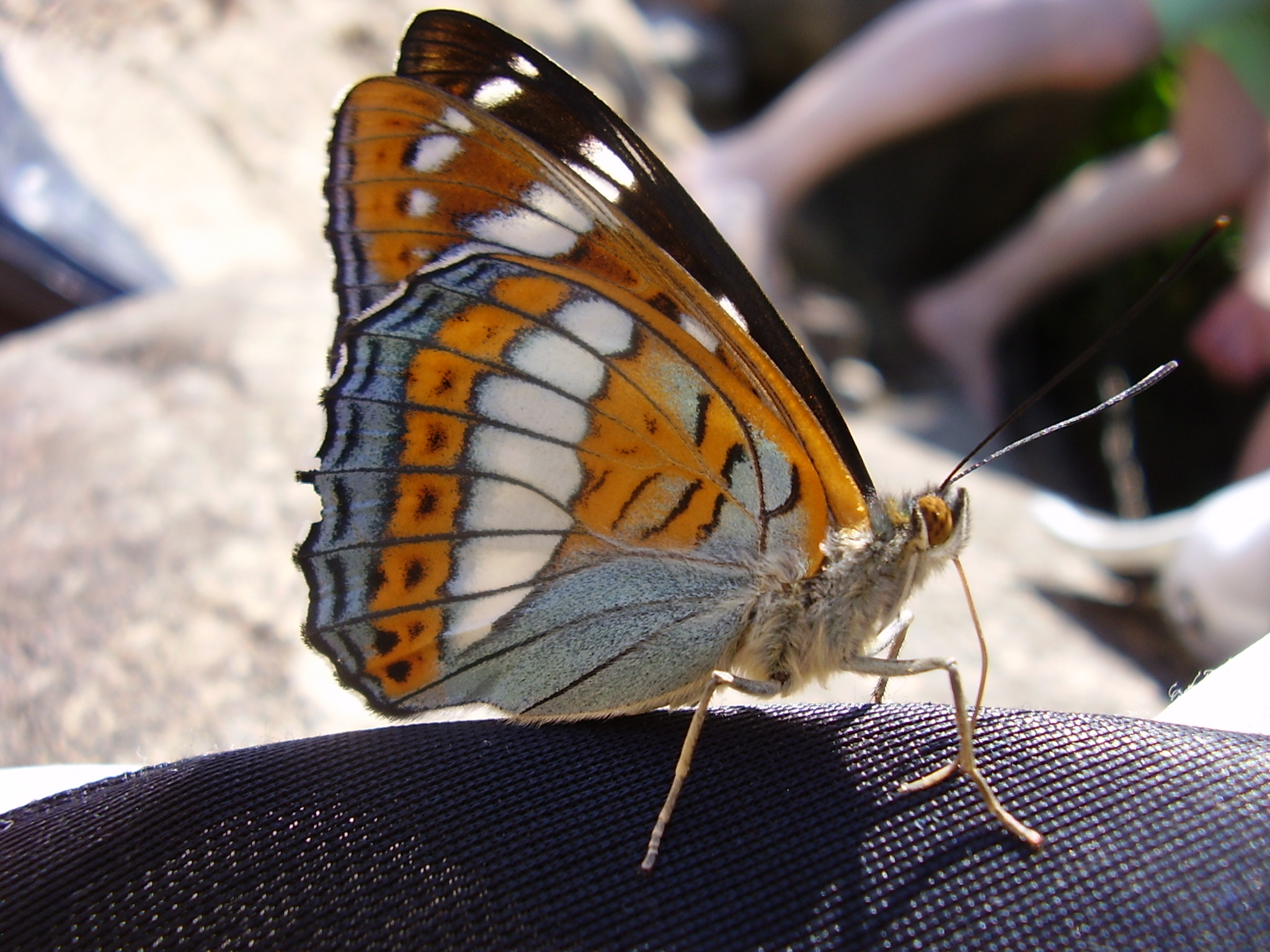

Scientific classification
- Kingdom: Animalia
- Phylum: Arthropoda
- Clade: Pancrustacea
- Class: Insecta
- Order: Lepidoptera
- Family: Nymphalidae
- Genus: Limenitis
- Species: L. populi

Binomial name
- Limenitis populi (Linnaeus, 1758)

= Poplar admiral =

Poplar Admiral

Species of butterfly

The poplar admiral (Limenitis populi) is a butterfly in the Limenitidine clade of the family Nymphalidae.

== Habitat ==
Poplar Admiral habitat is widespread in continental Europe and many areas in Asia. The large, seldom-seen Poplar Admiral is one of the biggest butterflies in Europe. It is found in deciduous forests, where aspen (Populus tremula) or black poplar (Populus nigra) trees grow. This is because the caterpillar only eats the leaves of these species of tree. In altitude, for instance in the Alps, where there are not large Populus forests, they accommodate with a grove, in the southeast of France they can be seen flying in large open spaces, for instance in the department of Alpes-Maritimes, as noted by Jacques Rigout. The males are easier to find. The females are rarer, because they tend to stay in the tops of the trees and seldom venture to the ground (see above).

== Characteristics ==
The wingspan in spread specimens varies for the males from 66 to 77 mm, and for the females from 82 to 85 mm, all measures done on the larger private collection of Limenitis populi, now in the hands of Jean-Claude Weiss, the well-known specialist of Parnassius. In fact the specimens in the field are relatively of the same size, the difference in measures are mainly because some sub-species are larger or smaller than other ones, it does not mean the size of this species is so variable in one location. It exists some specimens very small, about half size, but they are issued from breedings. So it is a noticeable difference in size between genders. The females have distinct broad white lines over their back wings. On the males the lines are narrower and fainter, and sometimes are not there at all. The upper surface is dark brown with white spots. The white stripe is surrounded by orange and blue borders. The underside is orange.

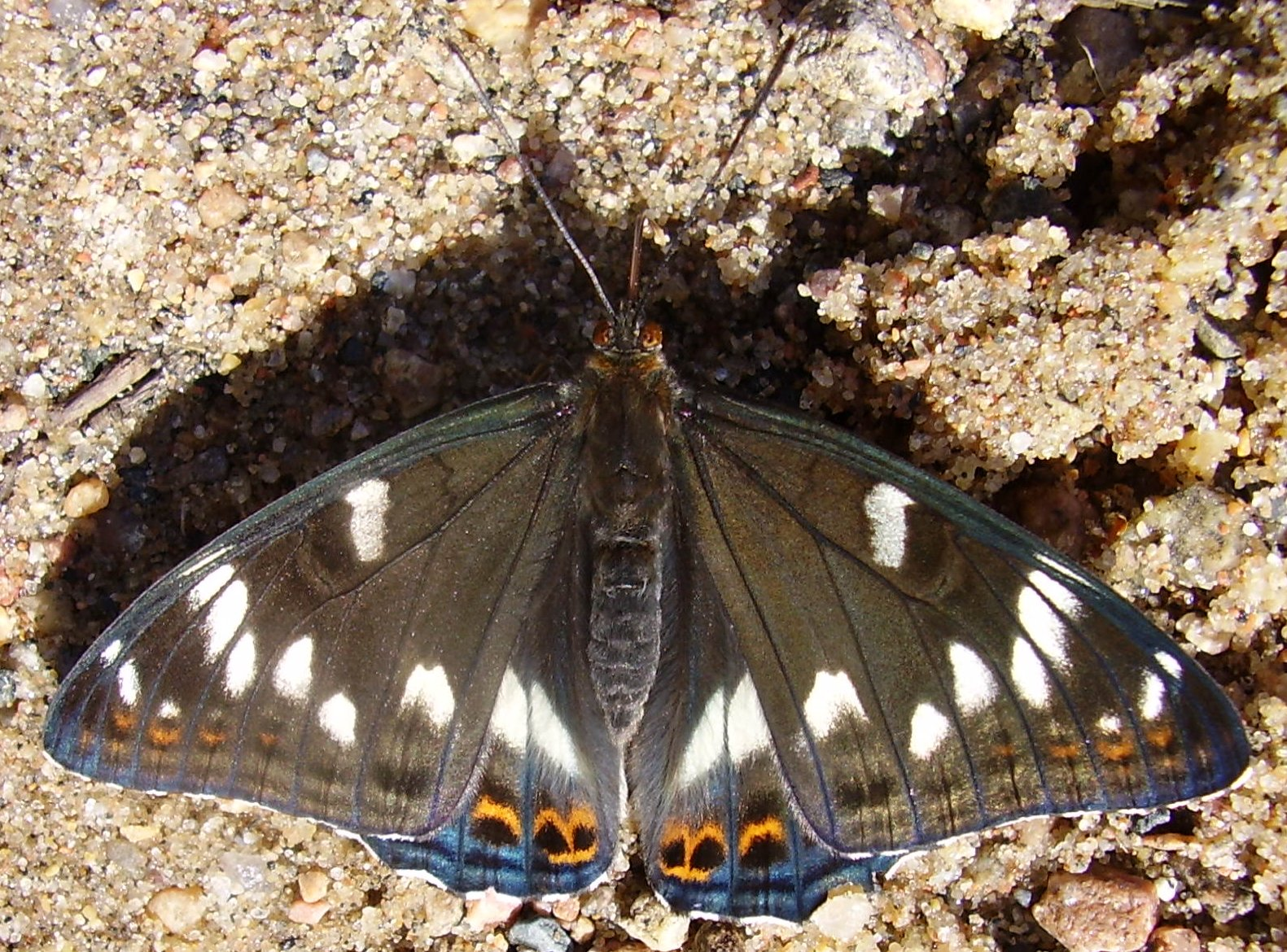
Poplar Admiral with opened wings

== Way of living ==
They are attracted to foul smells, such as those given off by carrion or dung. The butterflies use their proboscis to draw important minerals from the sap of trees, from the ground or also from sweat. They do not visit flowers. An important study about the life of this species in central France has been done by Jacques Boudinot.

== Metamorphosis ==
The butterflies feed on aspens, and occasionally also black poplars in warm, wind-free locations. It is there that they lay their green eggs on the top side of the leaves.

=== Egg ===
Many errors in the literature still persits, such as Eugen Niculescu who described the egg with ribs. In fact the egg is covered with hollow polygons as seen on photos in the book of Yukio Tabuchi. The duration of the egg stage is 7 days, not 14 as E. Niculescu writes (l.c.).

=== Caterpillar ===
Georg Dorfmeister was the first who described and figured the caterpillar (and the chrysalid).

Ekkehard Friedrich describes clearly the early stages of the young larva.

In Europe, caterpillars feed on aspen trees: Populus tremula and P. nigra (not on P. alba). In Japan, they eat Populus maximowiczii (Tabuchi), the Japanese subspecies even accept many varieties of willow (Salix sp.) in captivity as experimented by Ekkehard Friedrich. In August the caterpillars, which are still quite small, make a cocoon from a leaf that they cut out and roll up. They spend the winter in this cocoon and then emerge from it before the leaves come out in the spring.

The green caterpillar has black and brown shades. Its head is reddish brown, and its sides are black. First it eats the leaf buds, then the new leaves. Pupation takes place in June in a leaf that is lightly spun together.

=== Adult ===
As a general rule hatching occurs from 3rd week of June to mid-July, although some have been known to leave as early as May (which is often the case in Japan). In France the record dates of the fly period is from the 30th May (in 1971) to the 16th of August (in 1974). Male are seen first, the female stay at the top of the trees and are sometimes found on the ground about two weeks lately, only in the morning, often when the males are no more seen. The fact is at the end of the fly period, only females are seen (the questions could be: are the males hatching before the females or are the males having a shorter life?). Male flight can be very fast, the female fly is quite slow, somewhat like a glider.

== Rearing ==
Limenitis populi has never seen coupling naturally in captivity. The manual coupling is described by Marion Weidemann, this is the Austin Platt's method which consists to partially suffocate the male (anaesthetize in a cyanide bottle) before hand pairing (Dr. A. Platt specialized on North American Limenitis species).

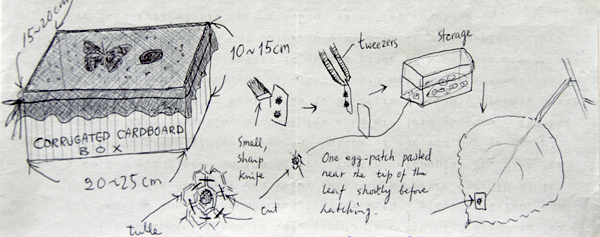
Takakura's drawings in 1975

For those who would be interested in the rearing of this species, here is a passage from a letter of T. Takakura dating from 1975. This Japanese entomologist was the first to do the crossing between Apatura iris and Apatura ilia. "The equipment I use is very simple: a corrugated cardboard box per female. The top is covered tightly with a piece of tulle. The female is fed on honey and water (about 5%, never over 10%) in a cotton pad placed on the tulle. Putting the poplar (P. nigra) or aspen (P. tremula) leaves on the bottom of the box may be useful but not indispensable, because few eggs are laid on them. the box and female should be kept at 25 to 30 degrees C (28°C appears best) and room light is enough… Eggs are laid irregularly on the bottom of walls, sometimes on the tulle. I usually remove the eggs at night by means of sharp-pointed scissors and a knife by cutting around the egg and carefully peel the patch off cardboard paper. The eggs collected this way are put into an air-tight plastic container with leaves of poplar or aspen. In two or three days infertile eggs will begin to shrink, while fertile eggs may be stored as they are until hatching is imminent. Spraying should be avoid, as inside of an air-tight container is apt to get moldy. But above anything else, you must have potted poplars and aspens for a successful management of this method".

== Distribution ==
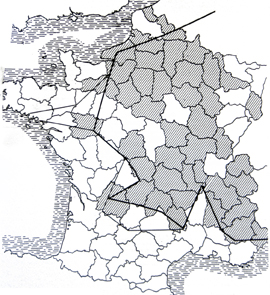
Distribution ofLimenitis populi in France in 1976

The species is known to occur in western Europe from Denmark to northern Italy (the Spanish record noted by Miguel-Angel Gomez Bustillo is doubtful), then Germany to Greece, Russia to Japan including China. Jacques Rigout has published precise distribution maps in France of this butterfly. The study was done by listing the data of the specimens preserved in the Paris Museum, those in the British Museum and the captures done by the French entomologists. The distribution since seems to be rather reduced (no more seen in Forêt de Mormal - North of France - the last 20 years where it was a relatively common species).

== Attraction ==
An uncommon method has been used to attract the butterfly in putting to the end of a pole a representation in paper of the butterfly. Walking this lure, several butterflies came to see this "colleague", including a female. This is a similar method experimented recently by Jamie Weir on a common butterfly.

== Conservation ==
The now rare Poplar Admiral is a protected species. The species is endangered primarily due to the clearing of forests containing the trees that they must feed on to survive. Conifer species are more interesting financially to exploit.

== Subspecies ==
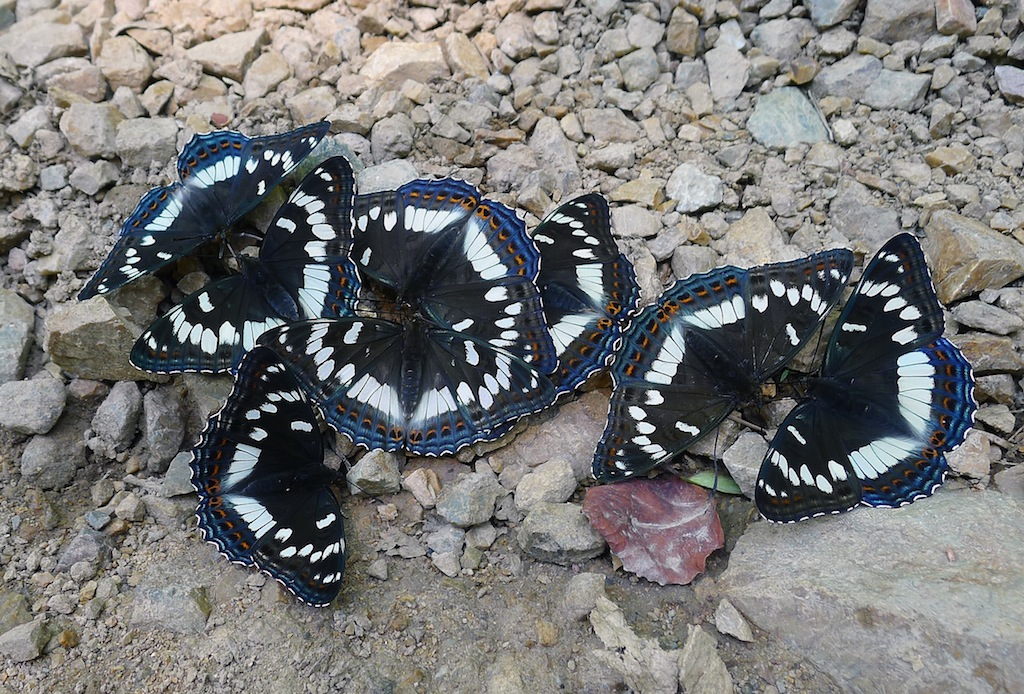
Limenitis populi ussuriensis

- Limenitis populi populi (Linnaeus), 1758. (Denmark, Sweden).
- Limenitis populi batangensis Huang, 2001 (Sichuan).
- Limenitis populi bucovinensis Hormuzaki, 1897 (Altai) (some authors say it is a bona species: Limenitis bucovinensis Hormuzaki)
- Limenitis populi enapius Fruhstorfer, 1908 (= eunemius Fruhstorfer, 1908, l.c.) (Siberia, Mongolia)
- Limenitis populi fruhstorferi Krulikowsky, 1909 (Ural, West Siberia)
- Limenitis populi halasiensis Huang & Murayama, 1992 (Xinjiang)
- Limenitis populi jezoensis Matsumura, 1919 (Japan)
- Limenitis populi rilocola Stichel, 1908- not Mitis - (South Europe, Greece)
- Limenitis populi szechwanica Murayama, 1981 (China)
- Limenitis populi tremulae Esper, 1798, with the forms belgiensis Cabeau, 1914 or diluta Spuler (Most of Europe).
- Limenitis populi ussuriensis Staudinger, 1887 (= liliputana Staudinger, 1887, l.c.) (Ussuri, Korea?)

Other names are for aberrations:

- defasciata Schutz, 1908 without the white bands at the hind wings.
- excelsior Reiss with the white bands very large.
- monochroma Mitis, 1891 with the upper face black with a shade of green.
- nigra Paux, 1901 (= monochroma Gilmer, 1909 (not Stichel) with the upper face entirely black.
- radiata Schutz, 1912 (not Fruhstofer, 1915) with the upper face black except two white spots.
- ruberrima Schutz, 1912 much more tawny.

Some very good photographs have been published in the journal Lambillionea.
