= Admiralty, Trafalgar Square =

Pub in London, United Kingdom

The Admiralty
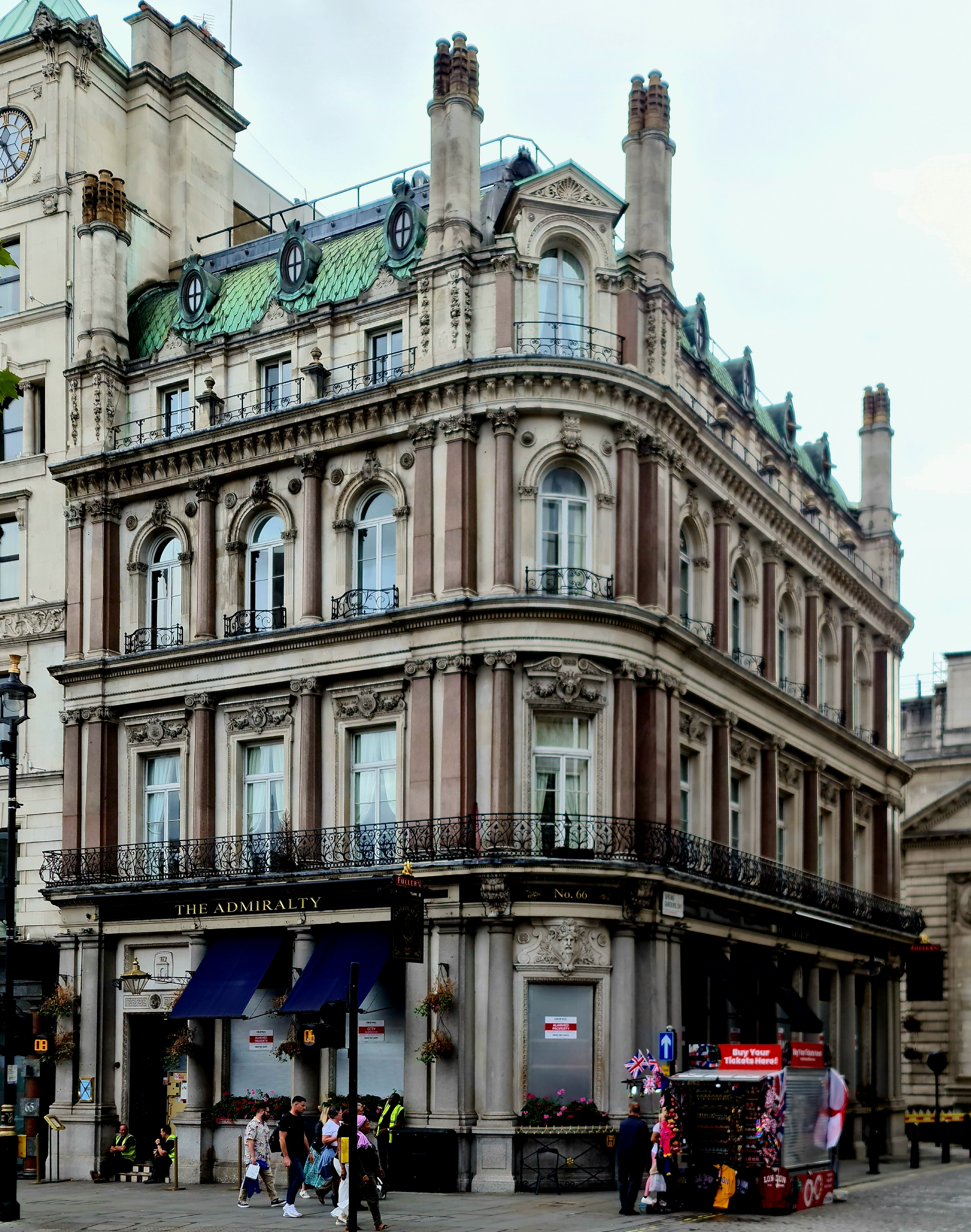
- Interactive map of The Admiralty

Restaurant information
- Established: 2014
- Location: 66 Trafalgar Square, London, WC2N 5DS, England
- Coordinates: 51.50744°N 0.128917°W
- Website: www.admiraltytrafalgar.co.uk

The Admiralty is a pub at 66 Trafalgar Square, London. It is the only pub situated on the square. The Italianate building was built in 1871 by the architect F. W. Porter for the Union Bank. It was listed at Grade II in 1987, by which time it was a branch of the National Westminster Bank.

In 2005, the building became Albannach (from the Gaelic for "Scot" or "Scottish"), a restaurant which specialised in Scottish food and whisky. It was founded by Niall Barnes, a Glasgow entrepreneur. To celebrate their first Burns night, the head chef, John Paul McLachlan, created a special haggis using a rare and expensive 50-year-old Balvenie malt whisky.

In 2014, the building was acquired by Fuller's Brewery. It re-opened as the Admiralty pub on 23 October of that year, two days after Trafalgar Day. The opening was performed by Admiral Lord West of Spithead, who had been First Sea Lord from 2002 to 2006, and by the brewery's chief executive Simon Emeny. During the opening a magnum of London Pride beer was ceremonially smashed on the pub's exterior. The pub's interior decor is inspired by HMS Victory, Nelson's flagship at the Battle of Trafalgar.

On 13 July 2022 a serious fire broke out in the basement of the Admiralty; over 100 firefighters and 20 fire engines were dispatched to tackle the fire.
