= Admiralty Bay =

Admiralty Bay is the name of several places:

- Admiralty Bay, Bequia, in Bequia, Saint Vincent and the Grenadines
- Admiralty Bay (New Zealand), in the Marlborough Sounds, South Island, New Zealand
- Admiralty Bay (South Shetland Islands), Antarctica
- Admiralty Bay (Washington), USA
- Admiralty Bay is a former name of Ganges Harbour, British Columbia, Canada
- Admiralty Bay is a former name of Yakutat Bay, Alaska, USA
