= Admiral (novel) =

Military science fiction novel

- US first edition cover
- Author: Sean Danker
- Audio read by: Johnathan McClain
- Language: English
- Genre: Military science fiction
- Publisher: Roc Books
- Publication date: May 3, 2016
- Publication place: United States
- Media type: Print (Hardcover); E-book; Audiobook
- Pages: 320
- ISBN: 978-0-451-47579-4
- Followed by: Free Space

Admiral is a military science fiction novel by Sean Danker, published by Roc Books on May 3, 2016. A mix of mystery, horror, and science fiction, the novel follows four strangers stranded on a mysterious planet who must work together to stay alive.

== Plot ==
Traveling in sleeper pods to their first assignment on the Imperial flagship, new recruits Deilani, Salmagard, and Nils wake to find themselves on a strange, dying ship. A fourth pod supposedly holds an Admiral, but the man they awaken does not seem like any military officer they have ever encountered before. As the danger of their predicament increases, they must put aside their varying degrees of mistrust for the mysterious Admiral if they want to survive.

== Narrative ==
Written from the first person point of view, Admiral combines military science fiction with elements of mystery and horror. Matt Stagg of Suvudu wrote, "With its warring empires and mix of aristocrat officers, fixers, scientists, and low-born grunts, Admiral reminded me of an earlier wave of science-fiction," citing authors like Larry Niven, Isaac Asimov, and Harry Harrison, as well as the role-playing game Traveller. Danker called the novel "science fiction with a throwback premise and modern execution". He added that though the story is told from the title character's perspective, "there are four principal characters, and four key junctures where four distinct worldviews manifest during the crisis ... Everyone has a role to play. Those roles aren't all equally glamorous, but they're all equally important." Writing for Nerd Much, Elizabeth Bernstein explained, "The tension mounts throughout the book as the characters continually solve one problem, only to be immediately faced with something more dire."

== Reception ==
Though noting that Admiral's "workmanlike quality shows skill", Publishers Weekly criticized the novel's lack of character development, calling it "flat and unremarkable". Kirkus Reviews described the novel as a "not-very-thrilling thriller dressed up in mediocre sci-fi clothing". Bernstein called it "a fun, atmospheric story" and "thrilling".

== Sequels ==
Admiral is the first novel in what Danker calls the "Evagardian series", which in May 2016 the author said had already been written in its entirety. A sequel, Free Space, was published in May 2017. The plot begins immediately after the events of Admiral. This was followed by The Glory of the Empress (2018), Innocence (2019), Snowblind (2020), Sons of Evagard (2020) and Highest Hopes (2021). Clear Sky (2022) is a sequel to Highest Hopes, featuring Tessa Salmagard. In 2020, Danker published Almayer Station, a standalone novel set in the same universe centering on Lieutenant Deilani and not featuring the Admiral, set between Admiral and Free Space.
