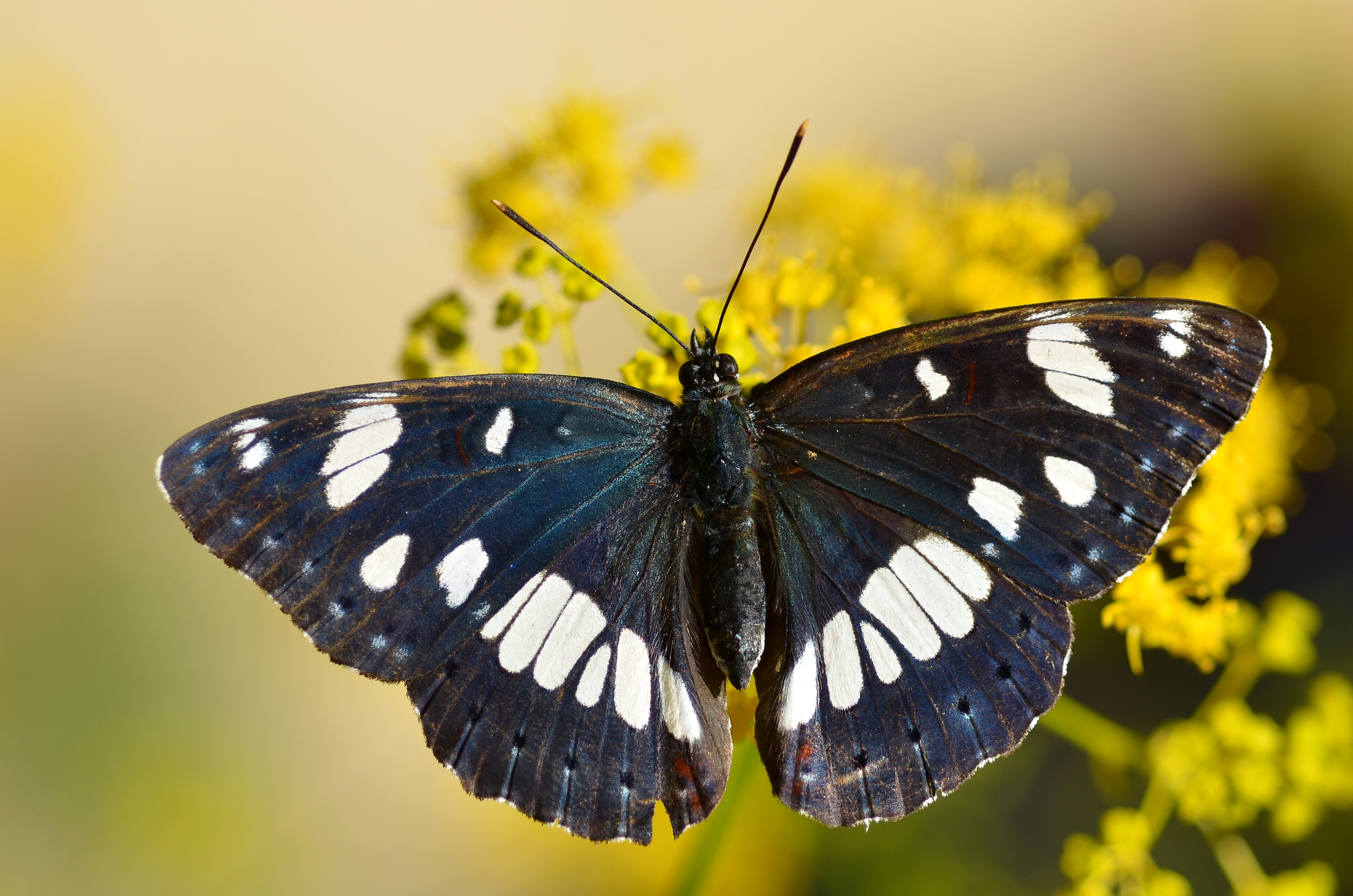
- Southern white admiral (L. reducta)

Scientific classification
- Kingdom: Animalia
- Phylum: Arthropoda
- Clade: Pancrustacea
- Class: Insecta
- Order: Lepidoptera
- Family: Nymphalidae
- Tribe: Limenitidini
- Genus: Limenitis; Fabricius, 1807

Species
- 25, see text

= Limenitis =

Genus of brush-footed butterflies

Limenitis is a genus of brush-footed butterflies, commonly called the admirals. The sister butterflies (Adelpha) and commander butterflies (Moduza) are sometimes included here.

The name Limenitis is Neo-Latin "of harbours", from Ancient Greek Λιμενιτις (from λιμήν, a harbour, haven).

== Species ==
Listed alphabetically within groups:

Species group Basilarchia (North America):

Image	Scientific name	Common name	Distribution
	Limenitis archippus (Cramer, [1776])	Viceroy	The Northwest Territories along the eastern edges of the Cascade Range and Sierra Nevada mountains, southwards into central Mexico
	Limenitis arthemis (Drury, [1773])	(American) white admiral or red-spotted purple	North America, ranging from New England and southern Great Lakes area all the way to various parts of Canada
	Limenitis lorquini Boisduval, 1852	Lorquin's admiral	Across the Upper Sonoran to the Canadian Zone, east to western Montana and Idaho.
	Limenitis weidemeyerii Edwards, 1861	Weidemeyer's admiral	Western Canada, the northern Great Plains (an outlying population), and the Western United States, from the Rocky Mountains westward to the Sierra Nevada and California.

Species group helmanni (eastern Asia):

Image	Scientific name	Common name	Distribution
	Limenitis helmanni Lederer, 1853		Eastern Kazakhstan, West Siberia, Transbaikalia, Amur, Ussuri, China, Korea
	Limenitis doerriesi Staudinger, 1892		Amur (Khabarovsk), Ussuri, Northeast China, Korea
	Limenitis homeyeri Tancré, 1881		East Palearctic

Unnamed species group (South-East Asia):

Image	Scientific name	Common name	Distribution
	Limenitis rileyi Tytler, 1940	Tiger-mimic Admiral	Arunachal Pradesh, India
	Limenitis staudingeri Ribbe, 1898		Seram, Indonesia

Ungrouped species (Asia and Europe):

Image	Scientific name	Common name	Distribution
	Limenitis albomaculata Leech, 1891		China, N.Sichuan
	Limenitis amphyssa Ménétriés, 1859		Amur, Ussuri, Korea, Central China
	Limenitis camilla (Linnaeus, 1764)	(Eurasian) white admiral	southern Britain and much of Europe; Eastern Asia, from Amur River extending as far east as Japan.
	Limenitis ciocolatina Poujade, 1885		Sichuan, China
	Limenitis cleophas Oberthür, 1893		China
	Limenitis dubernardi Oberthür, 1903		Tibet, China
	Limenitis glorifica Fruhstorfer, 1909	Honshu white admiral	island of Honshu, in Japan
	Limenitis lepechini Erschoff, 1874		Samarkand, Uzbekistan, Tadzhikistan
	Limenitis moltrechti Kardakov, 1928		Amur, Ussuri, Korea, Kyuojo, Kanhoku
	Limenitis populi (Linnaeus, 1758)	poplar admiral	widespread in continental Europe and many areas in Asia
	Limenitis reducta Staudinger, 1901	southern white admiral	central and southern Europe (northern Spain, southern and eastern France, Italy, the Balkans, and the Alps),[16] in Western Asia, in Syria, the Caucasus and Iran.
	Limenitis sydyi Lederer, 1853		Lower Bukhtarma R., E. Kazakhstan; West Altai in Russia; Eastern Transbaikalia, Amur, Ussuri, China, Korea.
	Limenitis trivena Moore, 1864	Indian white admiral	tropical and subtropical Asia.
