= Admirals (philately) =

British Commonwealth definitive stamp series

Admirals are a series of definitive stamps issued by three countries of the British Commonwealth that show King George V of Great Britain and the British Dominions. The stamps are referred to as the Admirals because King George is depicted in his Admiral of the Fleet uniform. The stamps were issued by Canada in 1911–1928 (Scott catalog numbers 104–134), New Zealand in 1926 (Scott 182–184), and Rhodesia in 1913–1924 (Scott 119–138).

== Canada 1911–1931 stamp issues ==
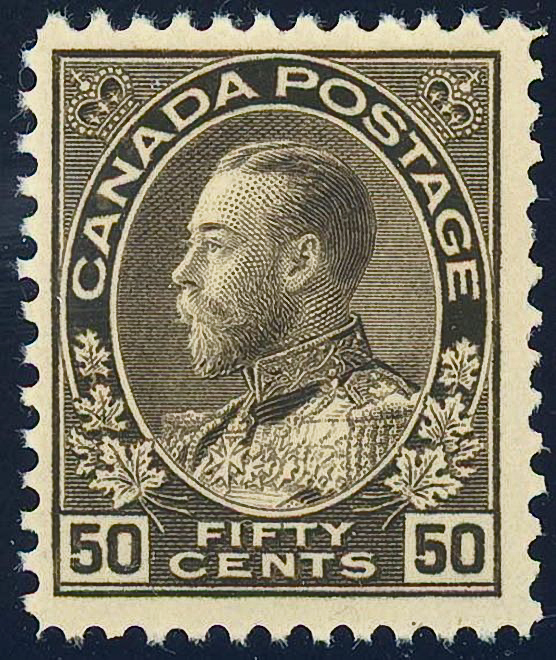
King George V stamp of 1912

Of the three countries that issued postage stamps portraying King George in his Admiral uniform, The Admirals, Canada by far, has issued the most examples, issuing several different series over a period of more than eighteen years.

George V succeeded Edward VII as King of England and the British Dominions on 6 May 1910; however, postage stamps bearing his image were not issued until late in 1911. The ensuing period, lasting until 1928, has become one of the most studied areas of Canadian philately which is somewhat unusual because only one basic stamp design was in use. There were several reasons for this, one of which was Canada's involvement in World War I from 1914 to 1918. This resulted in a scarcity of both engravers and the basic resources and materials needed to design and print postage stamps. Changes in currency exchange rates and international postal rates after World War One resulted in the Canadian Post Office issuing new denominations, as well as a change in the stamp's colors. The unusually long issuing period required new dies and several plates to be struck, resulting in a large range of flaws and other varieties for a stamp collector to study. Philatelists have also studied the Admirals in great depth due to the large numbers of varieties of the stamps.

On 22 December 1911, the first Canadian definitive stamps, the 1-cent and 2-cent denominations with a portrait of King George V, were issued and saw postal use for about 16 years, which was longer than any other definitives except for the Small Queens. The Admiral series is renowned for its multitude of re-entries and re-touches and like the Small Queen issue has the distinction of being one of the most extensively researched stamps issues by the Canadian government.

First series, 1911–1931

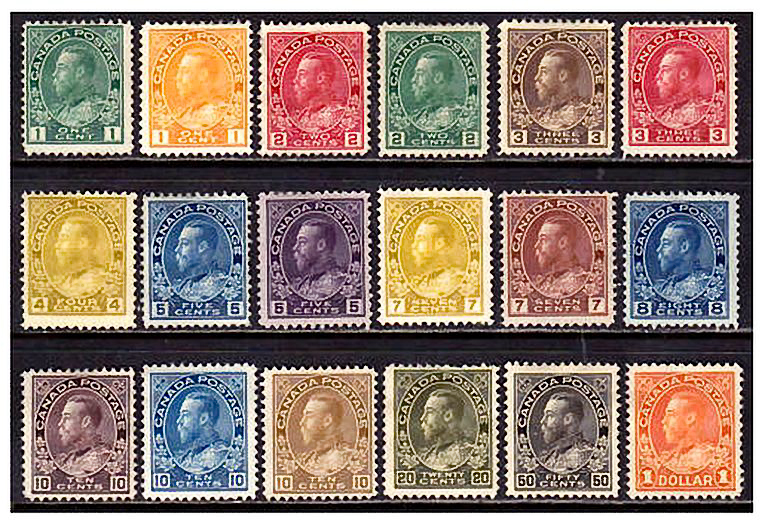
The King George 'Admirals' issues, 1911–1931

The first series of the King George V definitive stamp issues depict the monarch in profile, facing the viewers left, and were issued from 1911 to 1931 with 11 different denominations ranging from 1-cent to 1-dollar. The engraving of King George is modeled after two photographs by H. Walter Barnettby and the other by W. & D. Downey. The engraving was mastered by Robert Savage of the American Bank Note Company whose main base of operation was in New York but which also had printing facilities in Ottawa, Canada. These issues are perforated 12 x 12. The 1, 2, 3, 5, 7 and 10 cent denominations were reprinted at later dates with different colors. Every denomination of the King George V issue were printed in panes of 200 and 400 stamps and cut into and issued in sheets of 100 stamps, or in booklet form with pages of 4 or 6 stamps. They were also released in coil form with three different perforation varieties and were first released in November, 1912. The last stamp issue of this series to be released was the 2-cent carmine issue which had the unusual perforations of 12 x 8 and was issued on 24 June 1931.

War Tax stamp issues

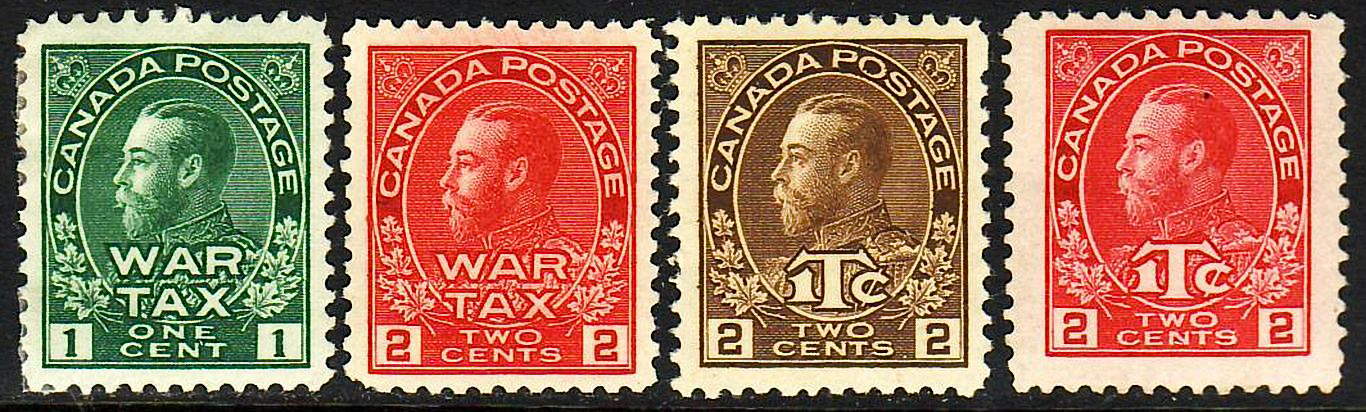
Canadian war tax stamps

During World War I, Canada enacted the War Revenue Act of 1915. The Act created a 1¢ increase on all postage in the hopes that it would generate $8,000,000 Dollars to help with Canada's war costs. The War Tax stamp issues were released between 15 April 1915, and December 1916, the last issue being released in coil form. During World War I Canada was the first country to employ the use of War Tax designations on its postage stamp issues and to this end the King George V postage issue, which was already in use at this time, was modified and printed with a War Tax designation, with two different engraved designations on the 1 and 2 cent issues. Like the regular Admiral issues, the war tax stamps were printed by the American Bank Note Company.

1915 Overprints

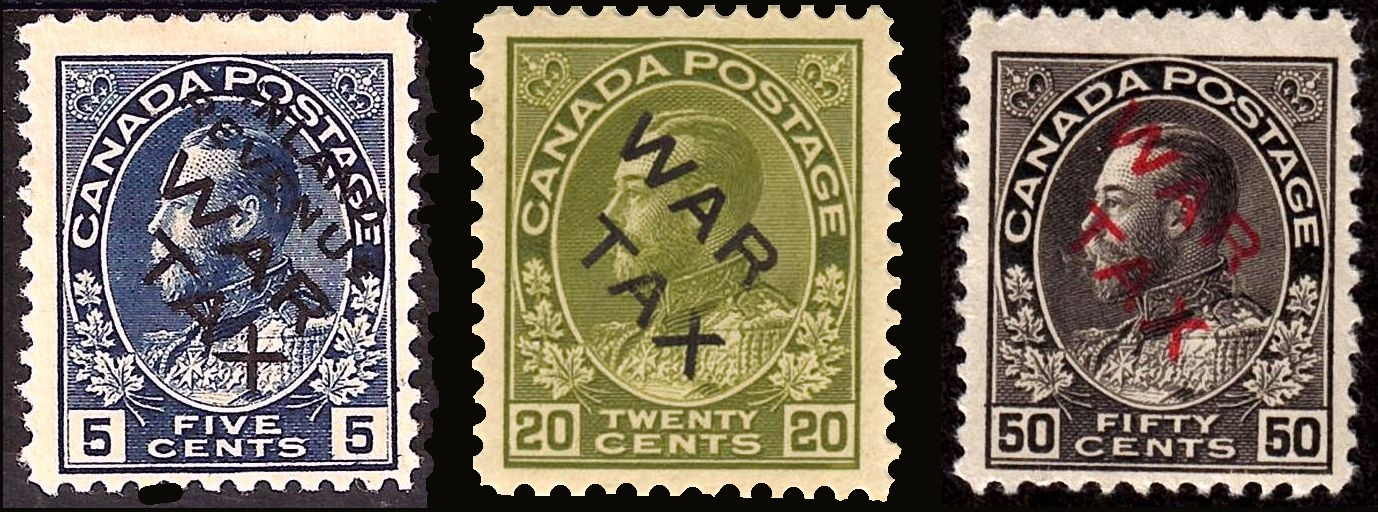
War tax overprints of 1915

Another type of War Tax stamp was issued with the a War Tax designation overprinted across the face of the stamp, in black or red ink. War Tax overprints were used in other capacities. War taxes were also placed on wine and spirits. To confirm the payment of this tax the Inland Revenue Department overprinted the blue 5¢ Admiral stamp with the inscription Inland Revenue WAR TAX, overprinted diagonally in black. The olive green 20¢ and the black 50¢ stamps were also printed with the same style overprint. The 50¢ KGV issue had the overprint in red. The creation of a war tax in April on medicine and perfume provided a use for all three denominations. The overprinted War Tax stamps were not issued to pay for postage but were meant to be used to pay the tax levied on money orders. However, because all the War Tax stamps did bear the inscription that read Postage they were showing up on mail in Post Offices across Canada. The problem with the overprints got so out of hand that the Canadian Post office terminated the use of the overprinted stamps on 20 May 1915.

The '2 cents' overprints

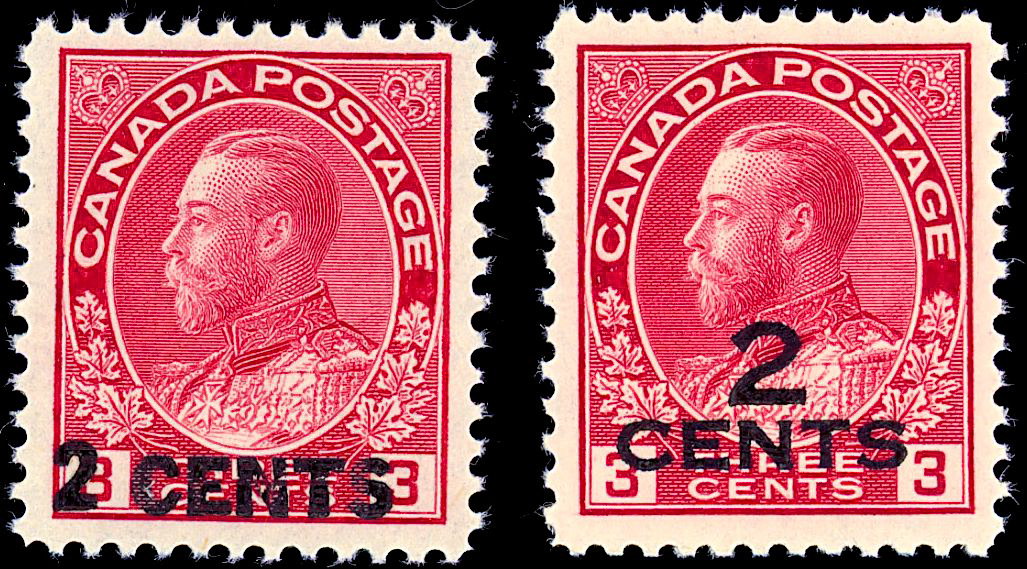
King George V overprints of 1926

On 1 July 1926 Canada's drop letter rate that had been in use since 1915 was reduced from 3¢ to 2¢. At this time the Canadian Post Offices still had large quantities of the red King George V 3¢ denomination in their existing inventory. To make use of this stock, which consisted of some 140,000 sheets of 100 stamps, the issues were overprinted with a designation that read 2 cents. There exist two basic varieties of these overprints with the 2 cents designation printed with one line of type while the other designation was overprinted with the numeral '2' over the word 'cents'. Other overprint varieties occurred when the contract to overprint these issues was given to The Canadian Bank Note Company. Some overprint varieties produced are rare and valuable and as such there are faked overprints of those varieties in existence.

Second Series 1928–1929

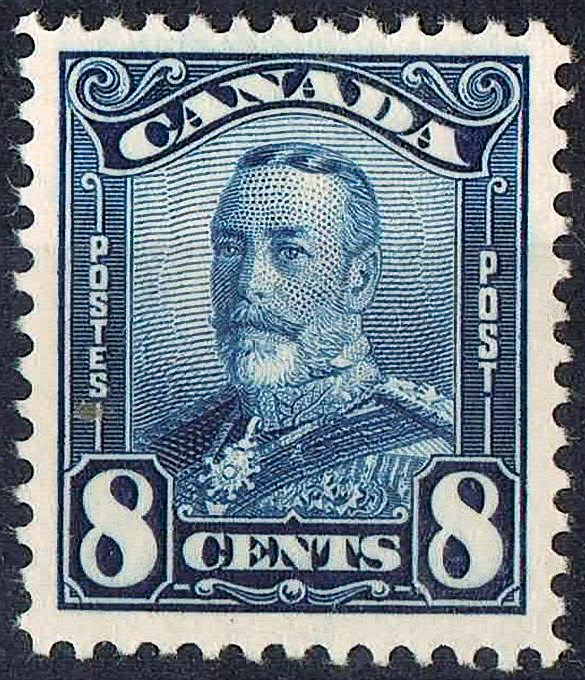
King George V stamp of 1928

The second series of the King George V Admirals stamps issued first started to appear in August 1928, as stocks of the first KGV 1915 issues were becoming exhausted. Rather than portraying the King in complete profile this series portrayed the King with his head at quarter turn, to the viewer's left. The series was issued in six denominations of 1, 2, 3, 4, 5 and 8 cents, with a different color for each denomination. The first stamp of this series to appear was the 4-cent issue, released 16 August 1928, while the 8 cent issue was the last of the series to appear, released on 21 December 1928. Stamps from this series that were also issued in coil form and include the 1, 2 and 5 cent denominations.

== Rhodesia 1913–1924 issues ==
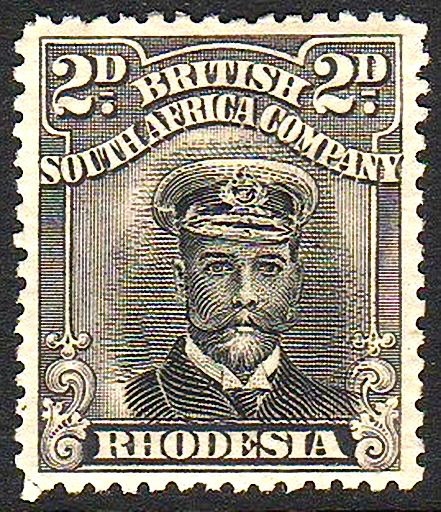
King George V stamp of 1926

The Admiral Issue 1913–1922

Proofs and specimens exist. The ½d, 1d, 1½d and 2½d were printed from a single working plate and the remainder were bi-coloured and printed from double plates. Three engraved dies for the head were used which can be identified from the shading on the King's ear and the shank of the anchor on his cap badge. Shades for these issues are numerous. These stamp issues were perforated with gauge 14 or 15. Because of this numerous color varieties and other factors correct identification can be difficult the collector. Many books on the subject are out of print and difficult to obtain as is other source information.

The Admirals of 1922–1924

The new issues were printed on white paper with clear gum. The texture of the paper is plainly evident and can be discerned easily. The 1923 issues, however, do not show the paper texture very clearly and the gum is smooth. The stamps were perforated 15 were never actually sent to Rhodesia, therefore genuinely postally used examples of these issues on mailed cover do not exist and any 'used' examples could only have been cancelled by request.

== New Zealand 1926 issues ==
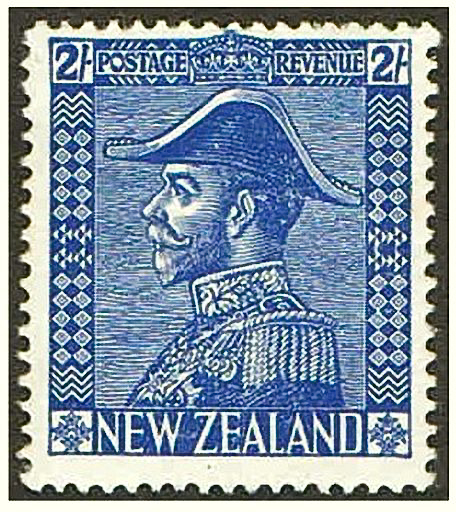
King George V stamp of 1926

In July 1926, two shilling and three shilling stamps were issued surface printed with King George V in the uniform of an Admiral of the Fleet. Waterlow and Sons engraved the dies and Bradbury Wilkinson produced the printing plates. The first printing of the 2/- and 3/- values of this series was on thin Jones paper in 1926. The 2/- was in deep blue and the 3/- in mauve. The engraved impressions are generally rather poor. In May 1927, the 2/- was issued on a thick Cowan paper and the 3/- was later issued in September 1927. The impressions on the Cowan paper are far better than those printed on the Jones. Initial printings of the 2/- value on Cowan paper can easily be distinguished from the earlier Jones paper as they are a much lighter and brighter blue. The colour became deeper in later printings. In November 1926 a 1d stamp was issued with George V in his uniform of a Field Marshal. The Admiral Stamp was only issued in 1926 for New Zealand and contains only three definitive stamp designs. Combined with the Canada and Rhodesia Admirals this makes for both a more comprehensive topical and/or historical study group of stamps.

== See also ==
- Postage stamps and postal history of Canada
- Postage stamps and postal history of New Zealand
