= Novo-Admiralteysky Bridge =

Novo-Admiralteysky Bridge< Ново-Адмиралтейский мост
- Coordinates: 59°55′50″N 30°16′32″E
- Carries: Automobile, foot
- Crosses: Bolshaya Neva
- Locale: Saint Petersburg, Russia

Characteristics
- Design: pending
- No. of spans: pending

History
- Designer: "Stroyproyekt" Institute
- Construction start: 2010
- Construction end: 2012 (planned)

The Novo-Admiralteysky Bridge (Russian: Но́во-Адмиралте́йский мост) is the planned bridge over the Bolshaya Neva River in Saint Petersburg, Russia. The bridge left-hand side leans against the New-Admiralty island (Admiralteysky District). In this place the quay of the Moyka River will be prolonged. The right side of the bridge leans against Vasilyevsky Island (Vasileostrovsky District). It is quay of Lieutenant Schmidt between 16-17th lines and 18-19th lines of Vasilyevsky Island.

== Construction ==
History of names
Originally (in 2008) the bridge it was planned to construct more low on a current and it was called "Bridge in an alignment of 22-23 lines of Vasilevsky island". Because of "a difficult hydrological picture" the bridge has been carry over. Since summer of 2009 local government and mass-media use this name.

In a project, height of flights will make about 6 metres, width — nearby 36, length — about 600 metres. The prospective total cost of the project will make approximately 7,9 billion rubles. Till 2009-07-15 should be submitted for consideration and the statement to the governor.
