= HMS Admiralty =

Two ships of the Royal Navy have borne the name HMS Admiralty, after the Admiralty, the body responsible for the administration of the navy:

- HMS Admiralty (1814) was a yacht launched in 1814. She was renamed HMS Plymouth in 1830, and used for harbour service from 1866, being renamed YC 1. She was sold in 1870.
- HMS Admiralty (1831) was a yacht launched in 1831, and renamed HMS Fanny in the same year.
