= USS Admiral =

Three ships of the United States Navy have been named Admiral.

- USS Admiral (1863), was the name of a Navy steamer before it was changed to USS Fort Morgan.
- USS Admiral (SP-541) A wooden-hulled motorboat built in 1913. She served with the Navy and Coast Guard until she was destroyed by a fire in 1920.
- USS Admiral (SP-967) A wooden hulled steam yacht, originally named Red Cross. She was taken over for the US Navy on 5 July 1917 and renamed USS Admiral (SP-967).
