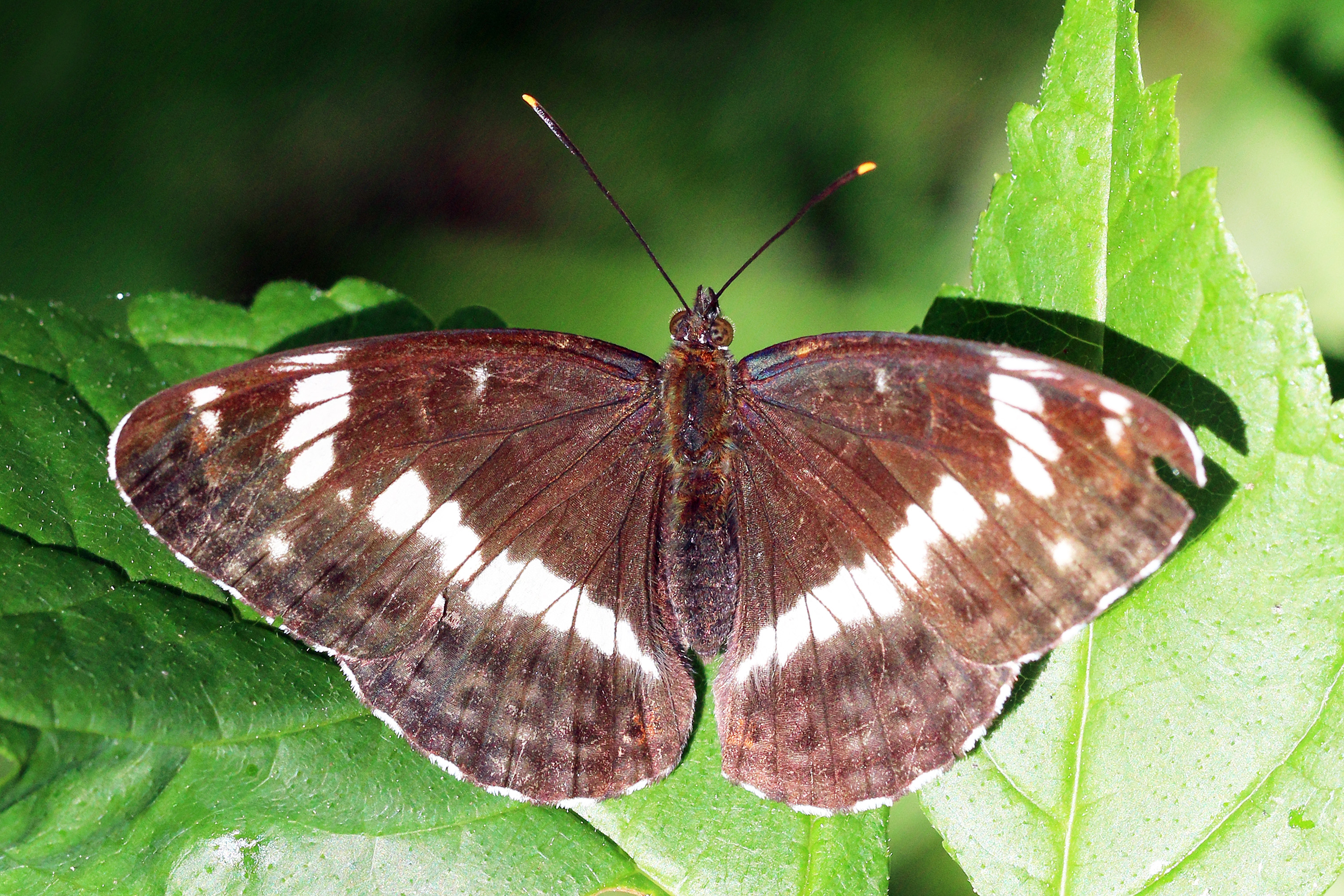

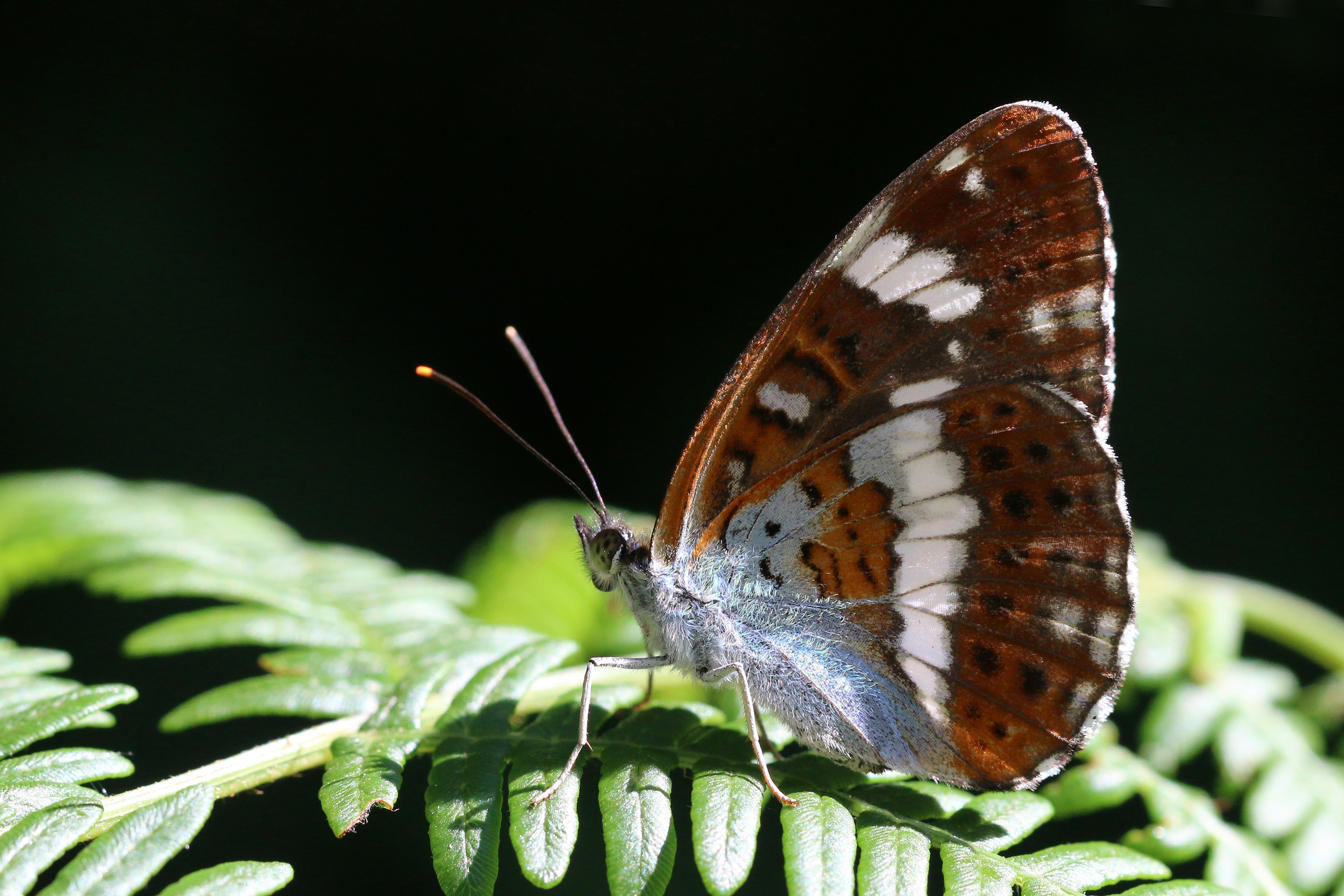
- Both, Oaken Wood, Surrey, England

Scientific classification
- Kingdom: Animalia
- Phylum: Arthropoda
- Clade: Pancrustacea
- Class: Insecta
- Order: Lepidoptera
- Family: Nymphalidae
- Genus: Limenitis
- Species: L. camilla

Binomial name
- Limenitis camilla (Linnaeus, 1764)

Subspecies
- L. c. camilla; L. c. japonica Ménétriés, 1857

Synonyms
- Papilio camilla Linnaeus, 1764; Papilio prorsa Linnaeus, 1764; Papilio sibilla Linnaeus, 1767; Limenitis sibylla var. stenotaenia Honrath, 1892; Limenitis sibilla puellula Fruhstorfer, 1909; Ladoga camilla

= Limenitis camilla =

White admiral

Species of butterfly

Limenitis camilla, the (Eurasian) white admiral, is a butterfly of the family Nymphalidae. It is found in woodland throughout southern Britain and much of temperate Eurasia and the Palearctic, extending as far east as Japan.

Adult white admirals have dark wings with white bands. The contrasting colours help to break up the outline of the wing, camouflaging it from predators. They have a wingspan of approximately 60–65 mm and have a distinctive, elegant flight consisting of short periods of wing beats, followed by long glides.

The white admiral is typically found in shady woodland areas, where it feeds on bramble blossom and honeydew and the female will lay its eggs singly on wisps of honeysuckle growing in dense woodland. The caterpillars are green with red-brown hairs and are camouflaged on a leaf by a mixture of their own droppings and silk. As autumn approaches it will form a tent-like structure made of leaf tissue known as a hibernaculum which it then secures to the stem with silk before hibernating. The caterpillar will then awaken the following spring and after a brief spell of feeding will moult, revealing a spiny green skin. It will then pupate during the summer, forming a green and gold chrysalis. After approximately two weeks the adult will emerge.

Larvae feed on Lonicera (L. japonica, L. xylosteum, L. tatarica, L. maackii, L. gibbiflora) and Weigela horstensis.

== Description in Seitz ==
L. Camilla L. (= sibilla L., aucl. cet.)(57a, b). Very similar to the preceding species [sydyi L. sydyi Led. (female 57a). Blackish brown, with white spots on the forewing and a strongly elbowed white band on the hindwing; at the apex of the forewing, especially in the female, some reddish brown smears. Underside for the most part brownish, the hindwing bluish at the base and abdominal margin, in the distal area with 2 rows of blackish spots, the spots of the outer row being lunate and forming the borders of a further row of whitish spots. The females have a less intense ground-colour, the whitish submarginal spots of the hindwing and the light and reddish patches in the cell of the forewing are more distinct.]; however, the position of the spots of the forewing is different and the band of the hindwing is but slightly curved, not elbowed; on the underside the black spots in the marginal area of the hindwing are all rounded, there being no band of light spots outside them as in sydyi[ Limenitis sydyi Kindermann, 1853 East Palearctic].

== Subspecies ==
Listed alphabetically:

- L. c. camilla – Europe, Caucasus, Transcaucasia
- L. c. japonica Ménétriés, 1857 – Amur, Ussuri, Korea, China
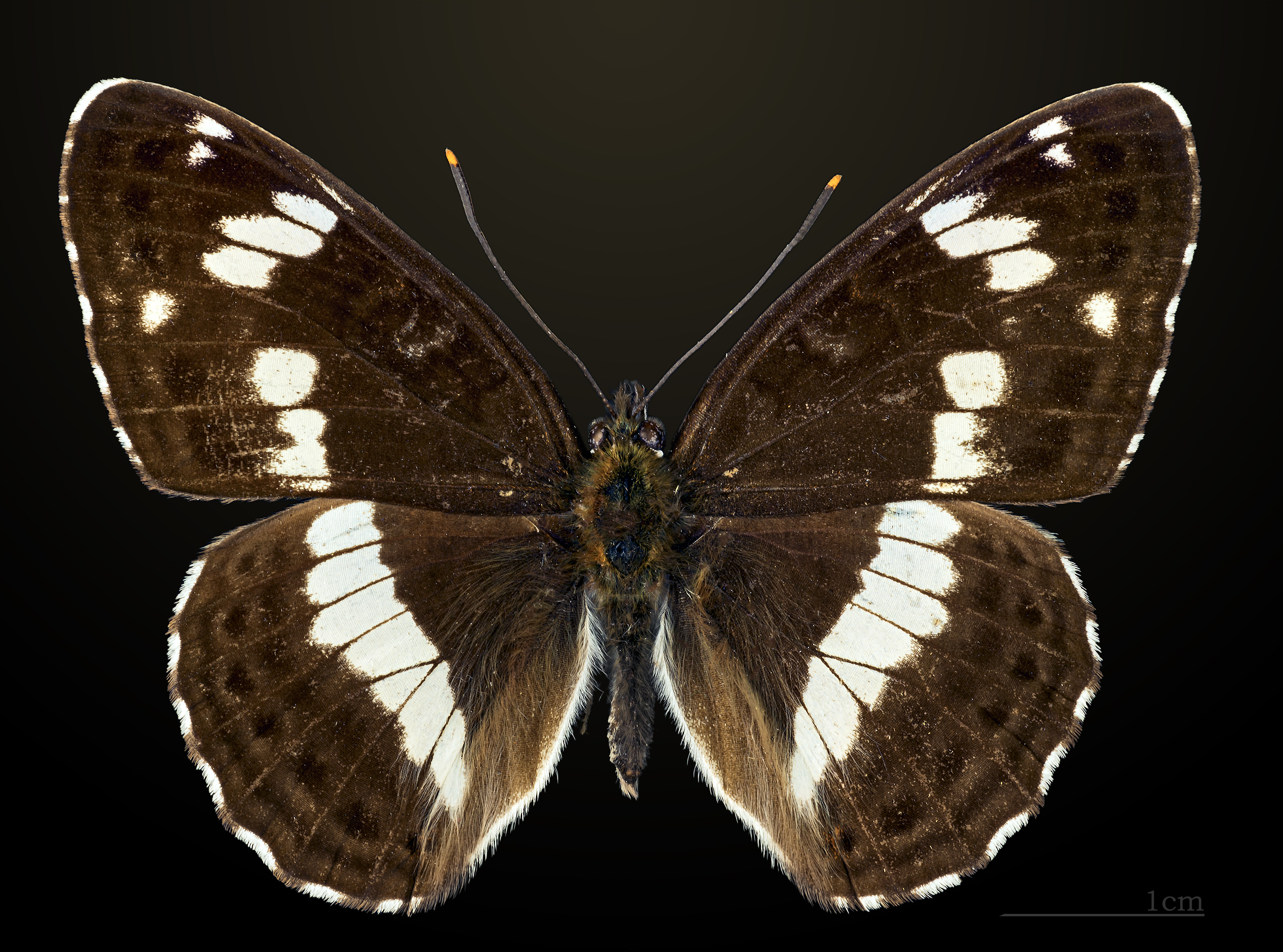
Dorsal side

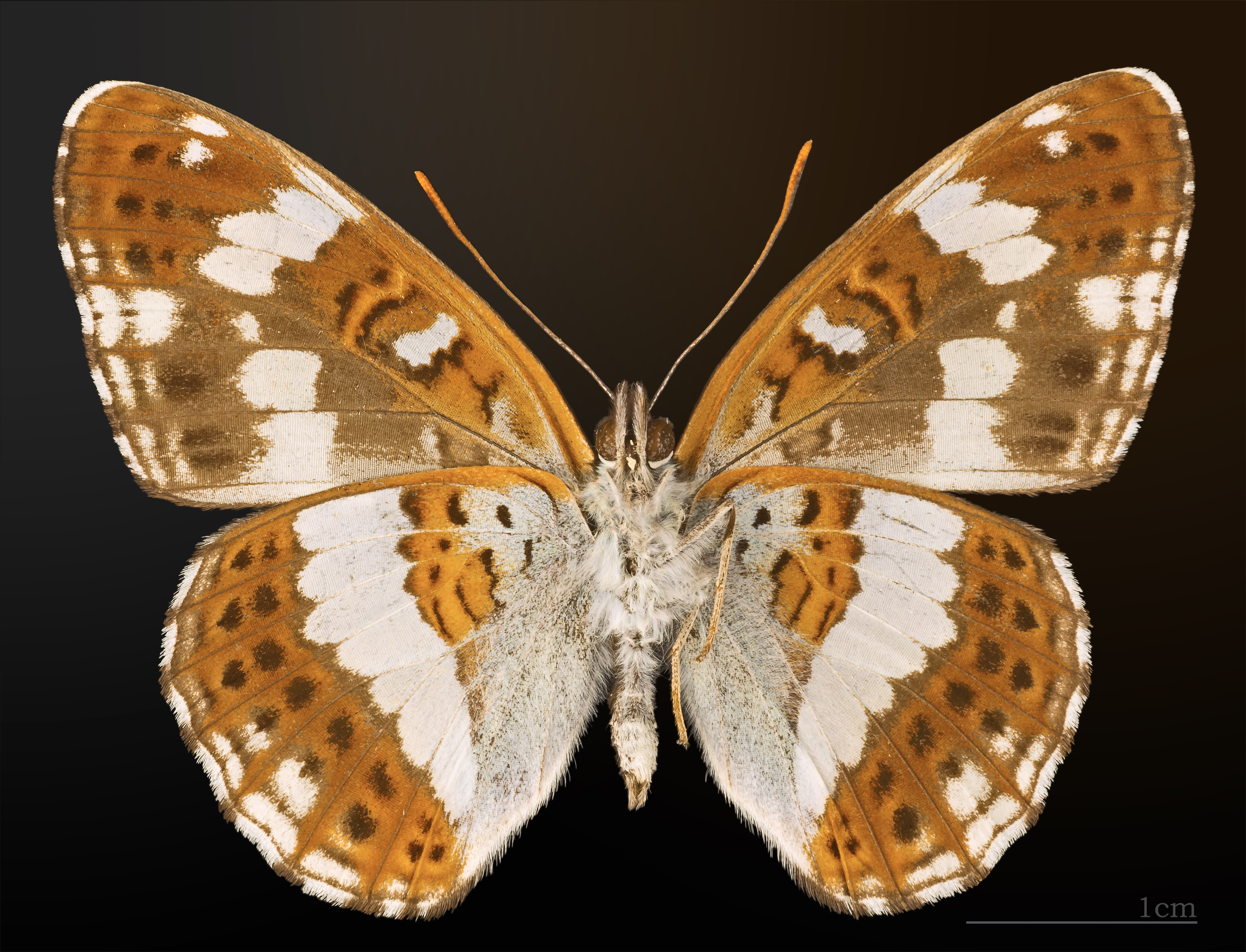
Ventral Side

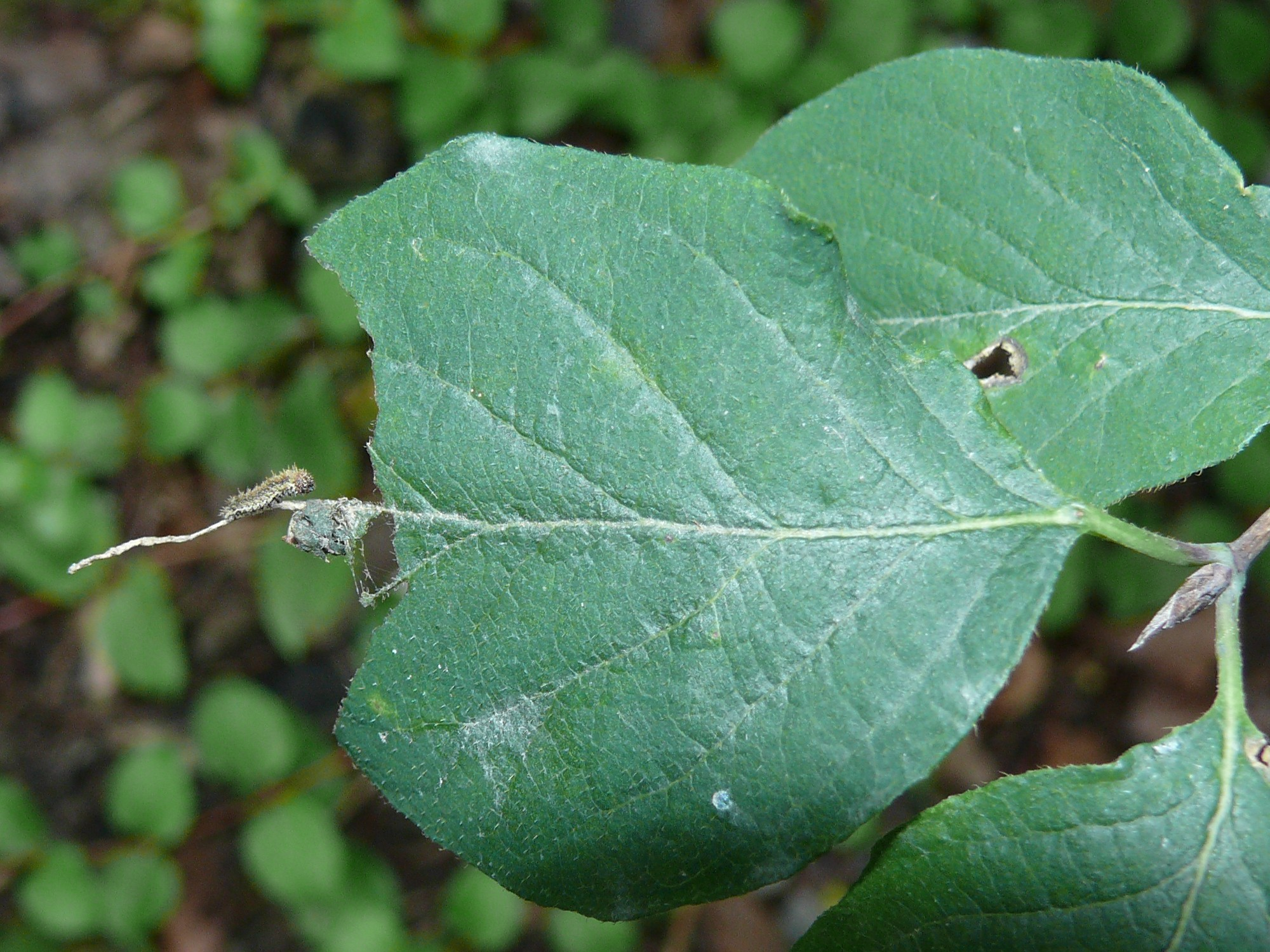
Young caterpillar

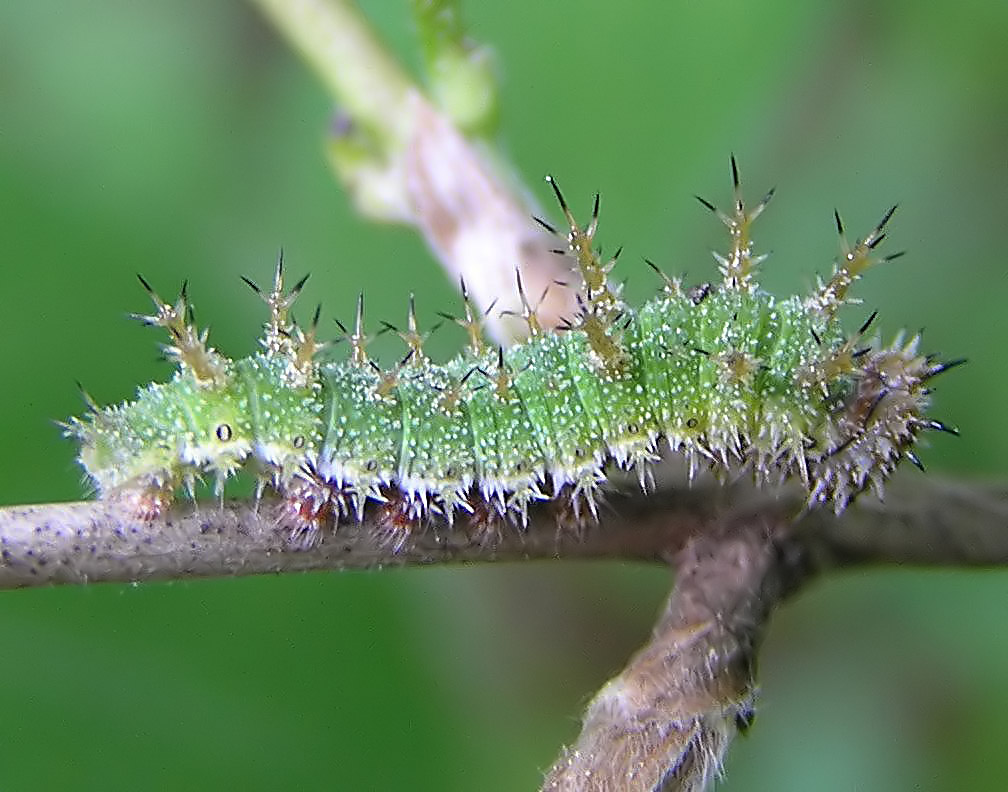
Caterpillar

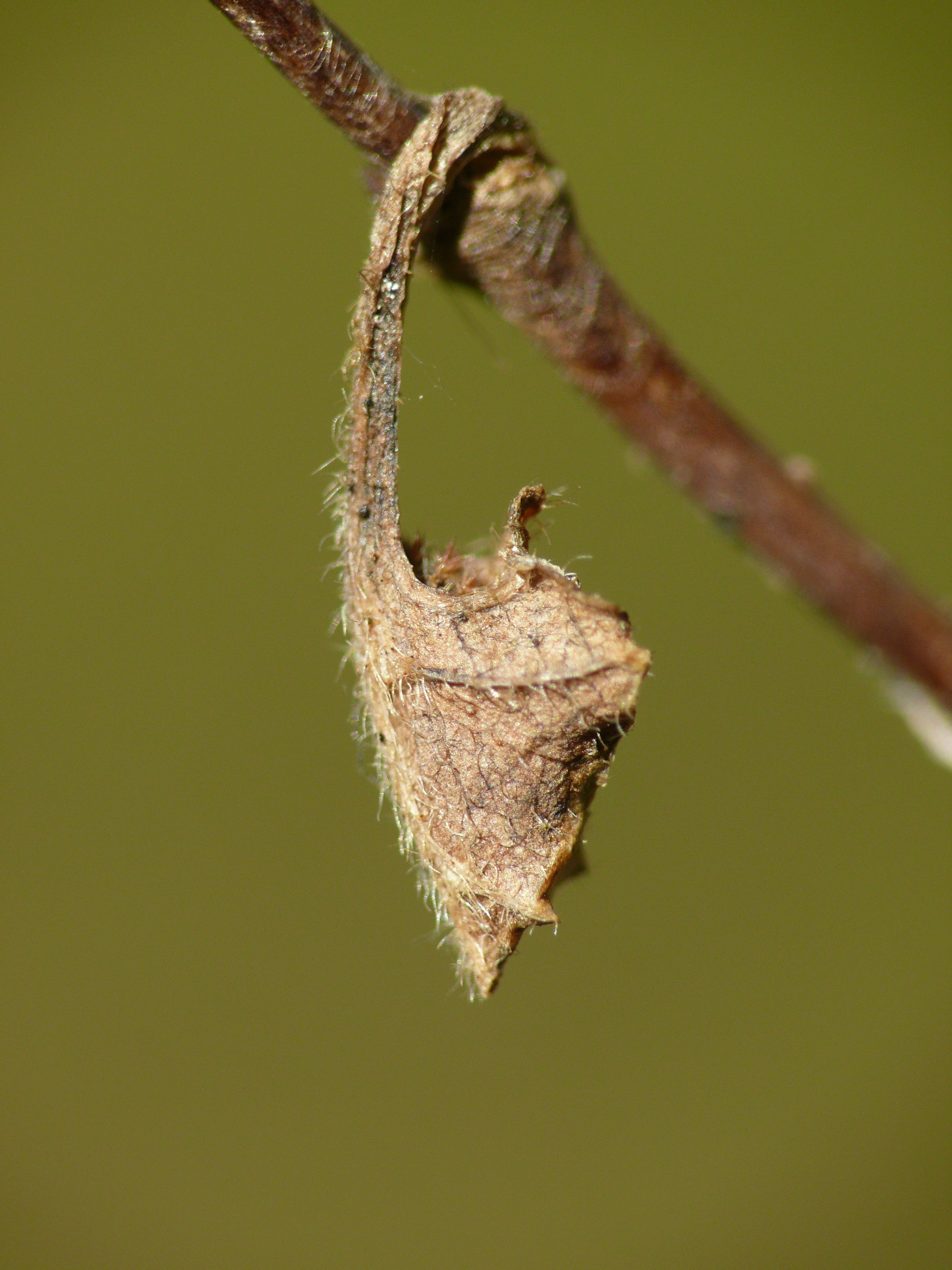
Larva in hibernaculum

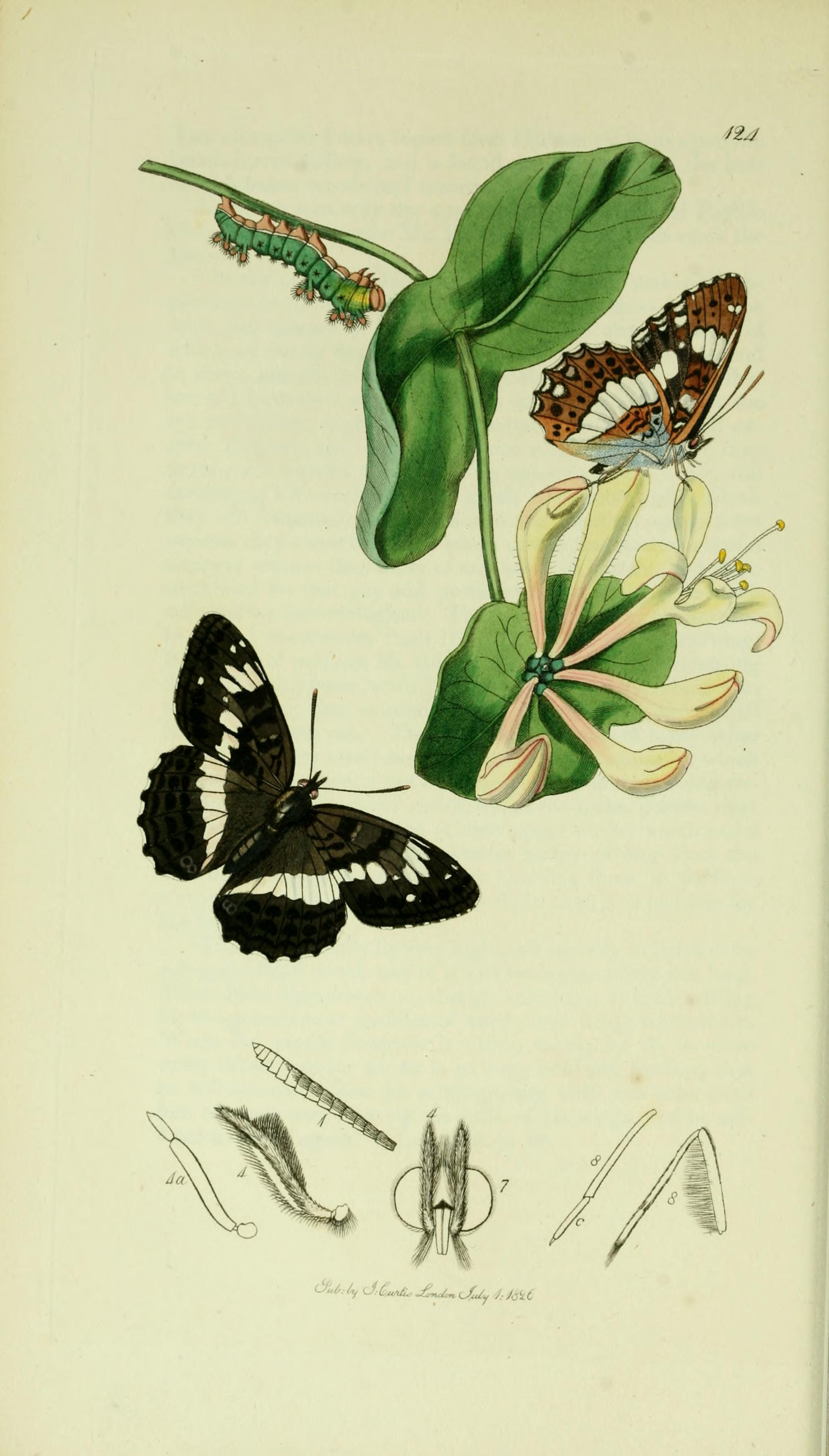
Illustration from John Curtis's British Entomology Volume 5

== Etymology ==
Named in the Classical tradition. Camilla in Greek mythology is an Amazon who died in the battle of the Rutuli with Aeneas.

== See also ==
- White admiral (disambiguation)
