= White admiral =

White admiral may refer to the following species of butterflies:

- Limenitis arthemis, in North America
- Limenitis camilla, in southern Britain and much of Europe and the Palearctic, extending as far east as Japan
- Limenitis trivena, in tropical and subtropical Asia

== See also ==
- Admiral of the White, a former senior rank of the Royal Navy
