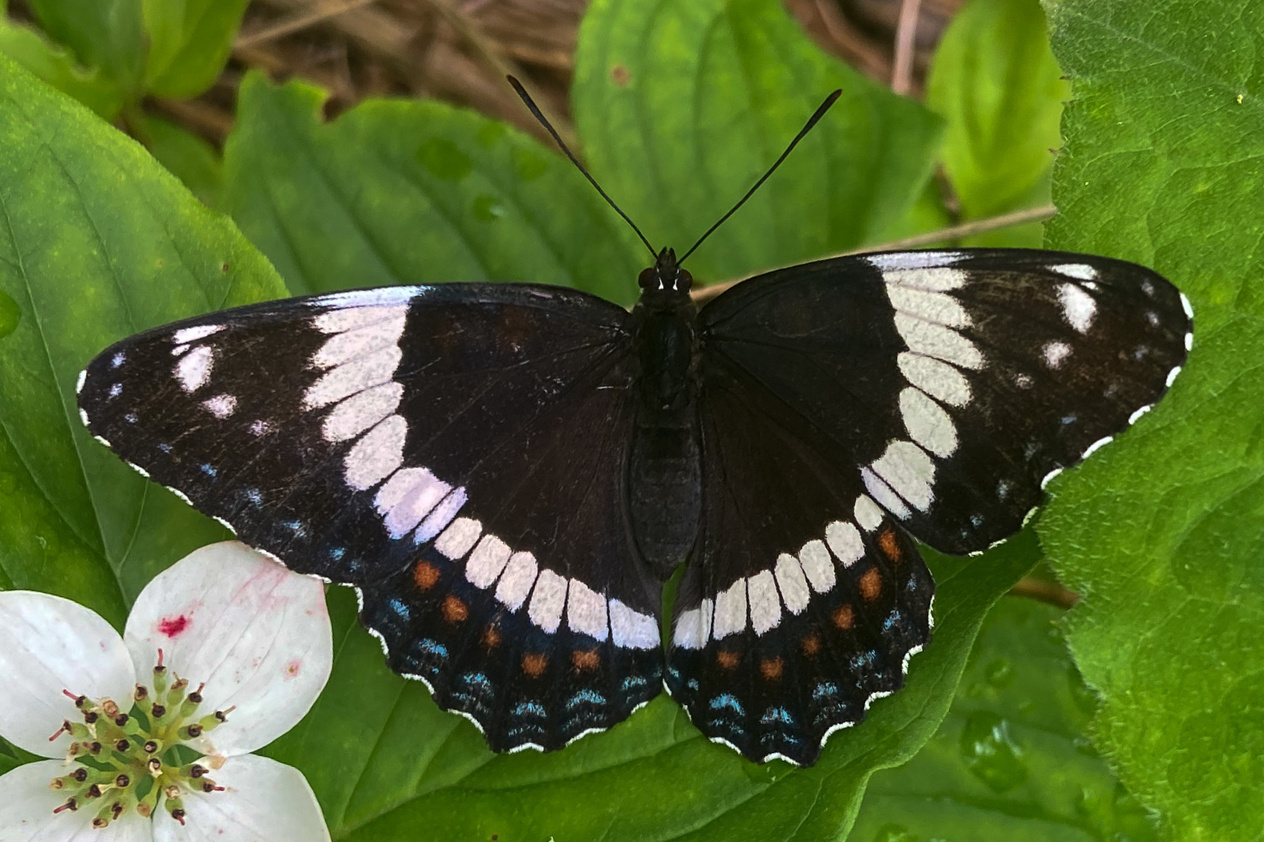
- Nominate subspecies L. a. arthemis

Conservation status
- Secure (NatureServe)

Scientific classification
- Kingdom: Animalia
- Phylum: Arthropoda
- Clade: Pancrustacea
- Class: Insecta
- Order: Lepidoptera
- Family: Nymphalidae
- Genus: Limenitis
- Species: L. arthemis

Binomial name
- Limenitis arthemis (Drury, 1773)
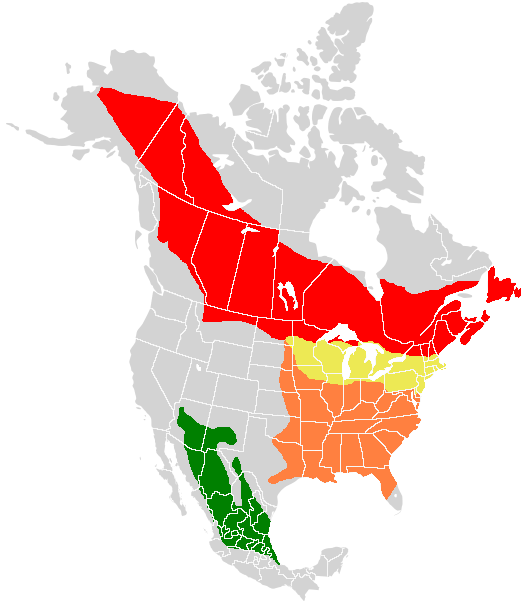
- Red: L. a. arthemis and L. a. rubrofasciata Orange: L. arthemis astyanax Yellow: Hybridization region between L. a. arthemis and L. a. astyanax Green: L. a. arizonensis

Synonyms
- Basilarchia arthemis Papilio arthemis Papilio lamina Limenitis proserpina

= Limenitis arthemis =

White admiral

Species of butterfly

Limenitis arthemis, the red-spotted purple or white admiral, is a North American butterfly species in the cosmopolitan genus Limenitis. It has been studied for its evolution of mimicry, and for the several stable hybrid wing patterns within this nominal species; it is one of the most dramatic examples of hybridization between non-mimetic and mimetic populations.

L. arthemis can be split into two major groups, mainly based on one physical characteristic: the presence of a white band along the wings. Individuals of the northern group, called white admirals, have a conspicuous white band that traverses both the dorsal and ventral surfaces of the wing, while those of the southern group, called red-spotted purples, lack that trait as they have evolved to mimic the poisonous pipevine swallowtail (Battus philenor). Due to overlap in distribution among the two major groups, intermediates are numerous as hybridization occurs frequently.

== Etymology ==
Limenitis (Neo-Latin "of harbours", from Ancient Greek Λιμενιτις (from λιμήν, a harbour, haven) – an epithet of Artemis, goddess of the hunt and the wild) – arthemis, from Artemis.

== Taxonomy and phylogenetics ==
Limenitis arthemis is a butterfly species in the tribe Limenitidini of the family Nymphalidae. The Limenitidini are a tribe of the better known "brush-footed butterflies", as they are known to perch on hindlegs, whereas the other two forelegs are positioned curled up. These two forelegs often have brush-like hairs, which is a key identifier of the Nymphalidae. The Limenitidini consist of 25 species grouped primarily by region. The Basilarchia species group, spread in North America, includes the American white admiral species, L. arthemis, as well as L. archippus, L. lorquini, and L. weidemeyerii.

== Subspecies ==
Dorsal	Ventral	Subspecies	Common name
		Limenitis arthemis arthemis	American white admiral
		Limenitis arthemis rubrofasciata	western American white admiral
		Limenitis arthemis astyanax	red-spotted purple, red-spotted admiral
		Limenitis arthemis arizonensis	Arizona red-spotted purple

- L. a. arthemis has the common appearance described in the description section of the white admiral.
- L. a. rubrofasciata has a brick-red band along the margins of the ventral hindwing, and are mainly found west of Lake Superior.
- L. a. astyanax has red spots on the underside of the wings, while the upperside has no white bands, but irridescent blue on the hindwings
- L. a. arizonensis has wings that appear similar to the L. a. astyanax, but pointier hindwings. This subspecies resides in the southwestern regions of the US.

=== Hybridization ===
Limenitis arthemis is one of the most dramatic examples of hybridization within a nominal species. The two major subspecies that dominate the hybridization are L. a. arthemis (white admiral) and L. a. astyanax (red-spotted purple). The white admiral is characterized by a bright, white band on its wings, while the red-spotted purple lacks the white band, but has cooler blue-green shades on its wings. Hybridization occurs in the area across New England, southern Ontario, and the Great Lakes, also known as the "suture region". It is at these regions that the subspecies were formed.

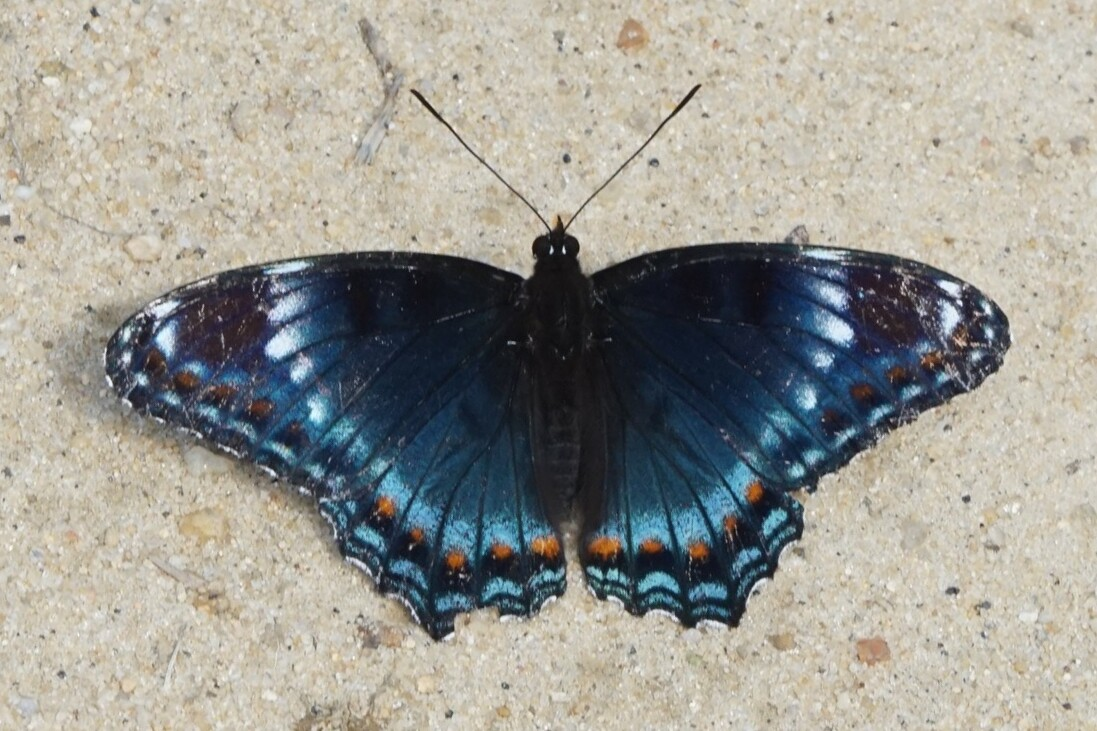
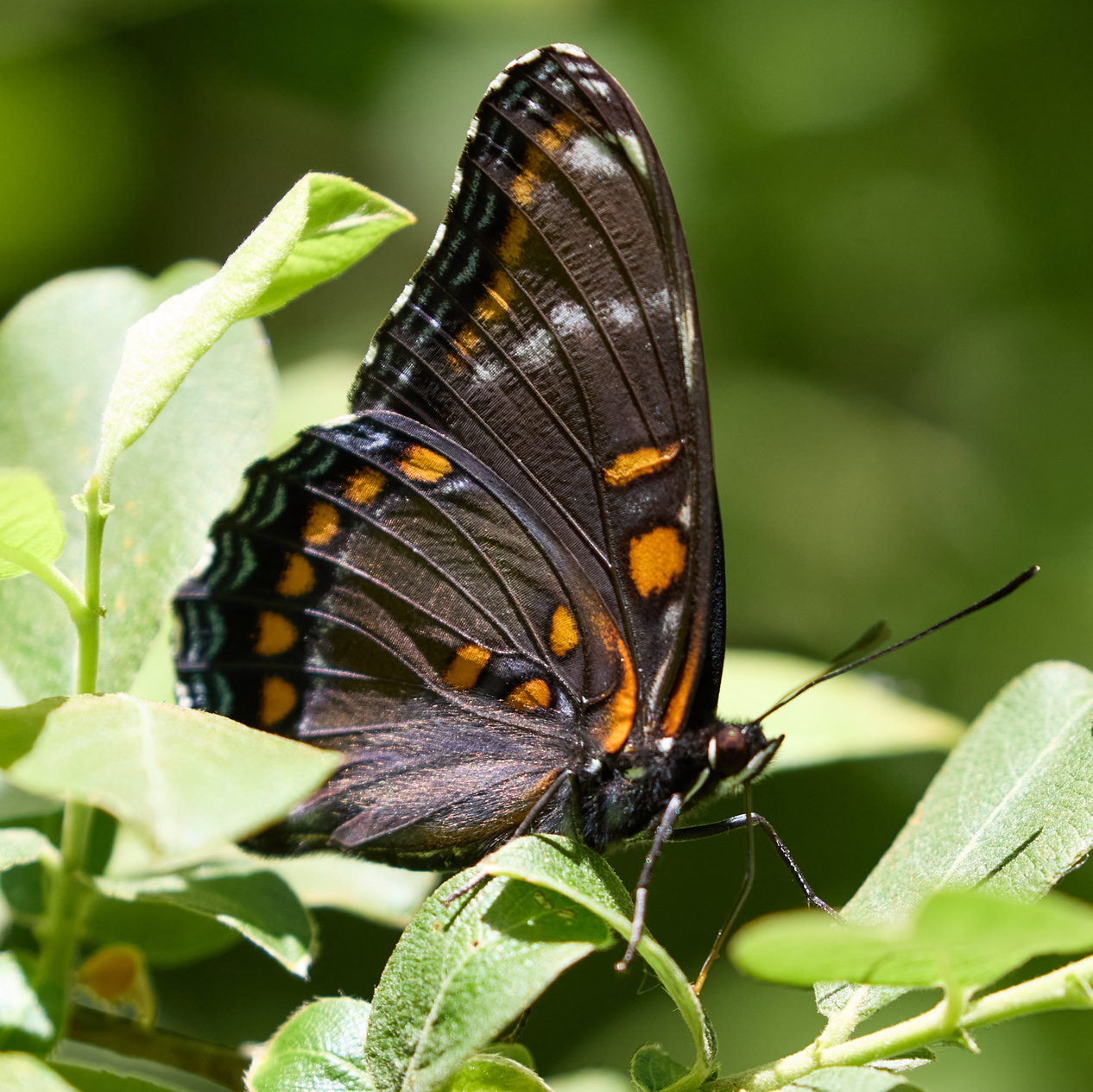
Hybrid L. a. arthemis × astyanax, in Massachusetts (left) and Ontario (right)

According to one study, these hybrid zones were of secondary origin, meaning that both the white admiral and the red-spotted purple are already genetically distinct and the two diverged lineages reconnect at this hybrid area. They were able to support their claim by examining various of mitochondria DNA of the population to determine the similarities and differences of the origins of the hybrid zones and the evolution of mimicry. Another study suggests that hybridization is highly frequent in this species because similar species mate together regardless of being the same butterfly or not. For instance, the L. arthemis was found to be mating with a L. archippus butterfly in New England.

== Description and identification ==
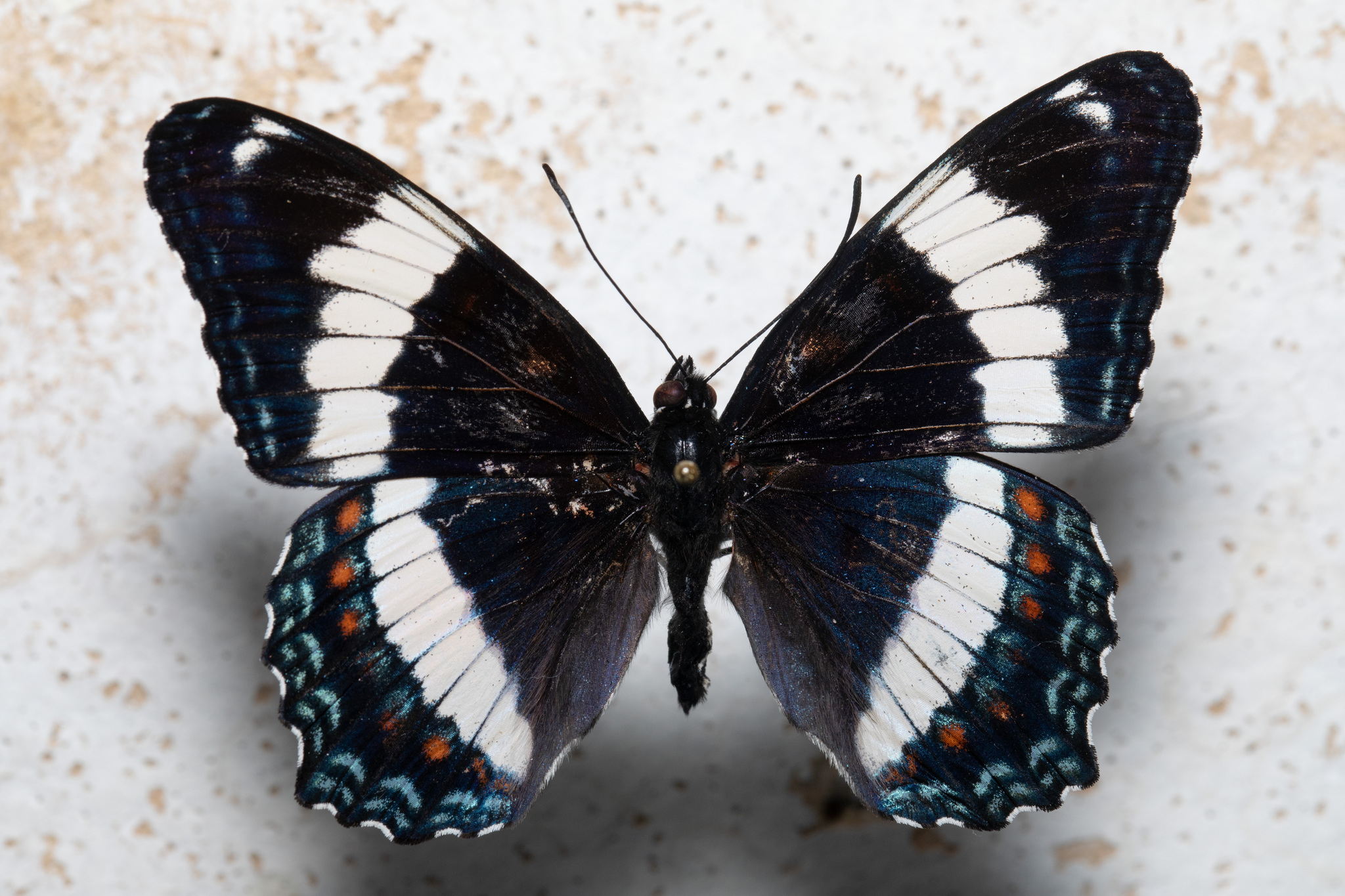
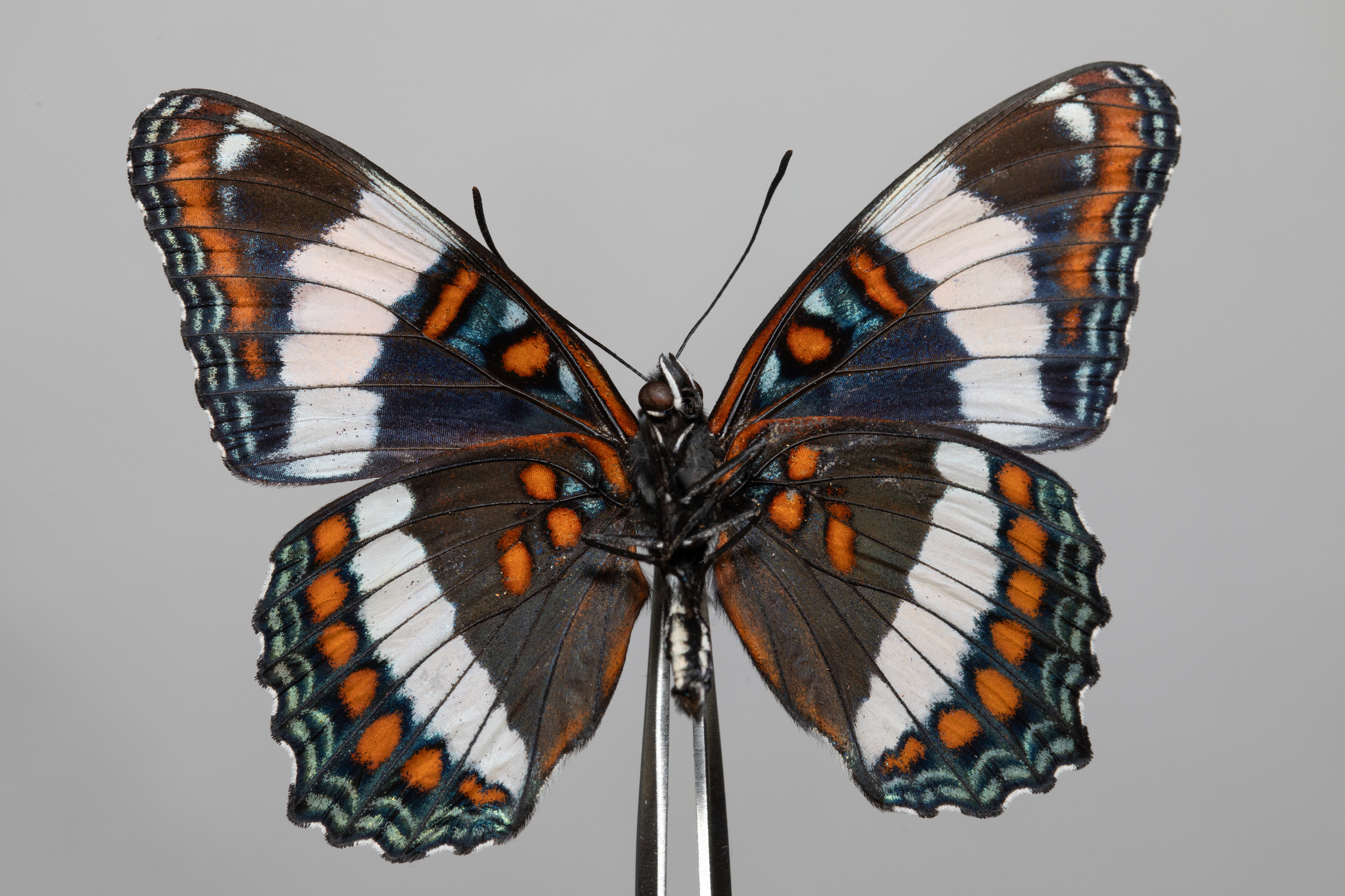
L. a. arthemis (nominate subspecies)

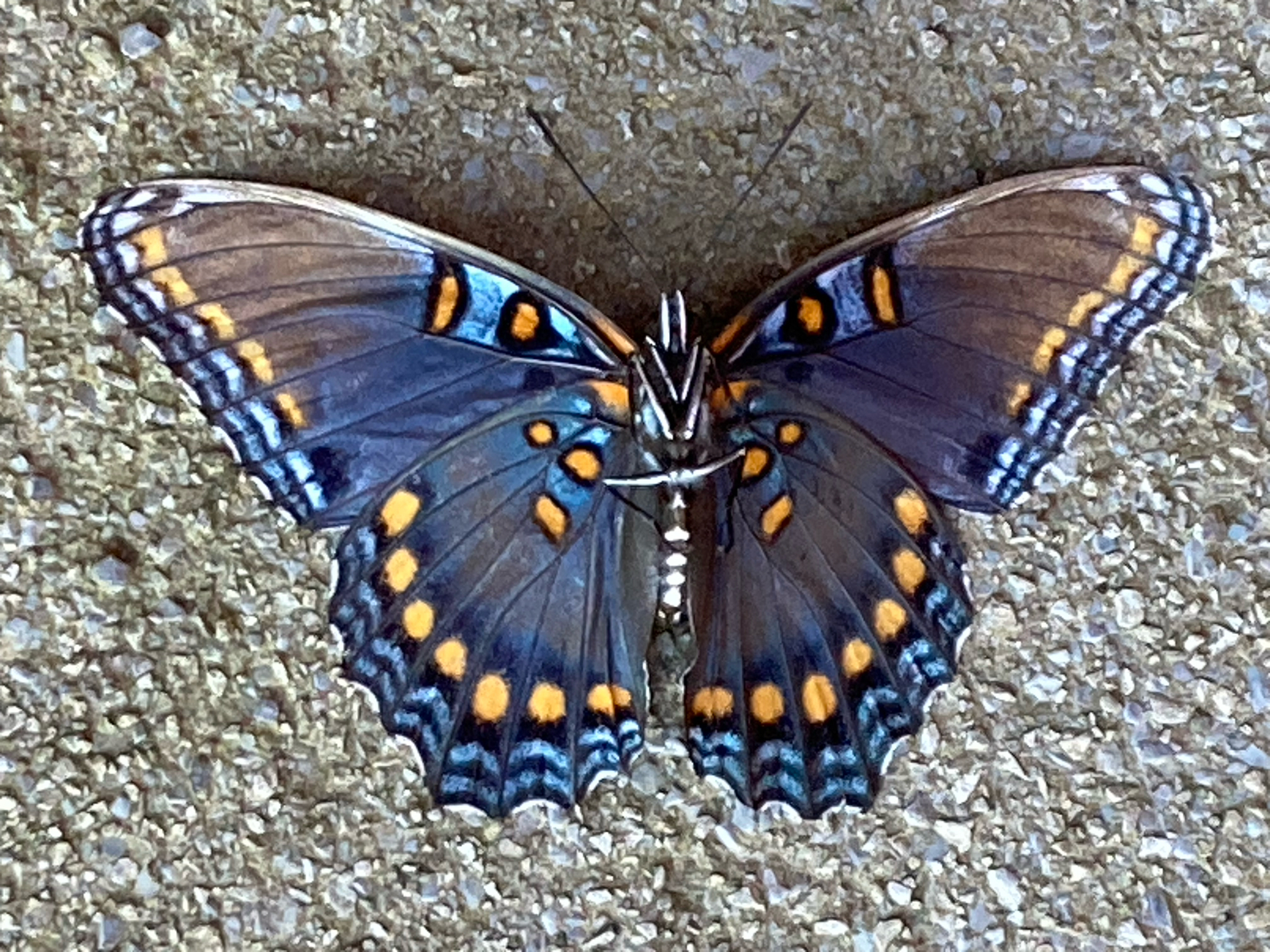
L. a. astyanax ventral view, Tennessee

Limenitis arthemis is described to be beautiful and highly active. The butterfly species themselves can be divided into two major groups simply from one main characteristic, the white band on the upper wings. However, besides the look of the butterfly, L. arthemis are in constant motion. Their flights are short in duration and at low altitudes, flying only about 2 to 3 feet off the ground. When not in flight, L. arthemis are constantly walking over leaves and folding their wings. They enjoy the sun as many are found to be resting at the highest points on trees. During the short period they are at rest, L. arthemis keep their wings closed, body at a 45 degree angle upwards, and antennae straight forward.

The two sexes of this species are identical except that the females are slightly larger than the males. The upperside of L. a. arthemis is mostly blackish-blue with white postmedian bands across both wings. Some individuals have a row of red submarginal spots, while others have this area being blue. The underside of the wings is a blackish color with a broad white post-median band. The basal area of both wings contains many red spots. The submarginal area may contain a row of red spots and the marginal area having bluish spots. However, sometimes the submarginal and marginal areas are just a reddish-brown color.

The upperside of L. a. astyanax is very much like L. a. arthemis except it lacks the broad white bands. The forewing submarginal area will sometimes have a row of red spots. The hindwings are either a bright iridescent blue or an iridescent bluish-green. The underside of the wings lacks the white band. The basal area has several red spots. It has a row of red submarginal spots and bluish marginal spots.

== Distribution and habitat ==
Limenitis arthemis are vastly spread out throughout North America. L. a. arthemis or the white admiral live on the far north side of the continent, ranging from New England and southern Great Lakes area all the way to various parts of Canada. L. a. astyanax are based further south from the New England and southern Great Lake boundary, and can be found as far south as Florida; the hybridization region is the overlapped region of New England and southern Great Lakes. These butterflies spend their days in deciduous woodlands, along the edges of the forest in shady areas, including roadsides.

== Batesian mimicry ==
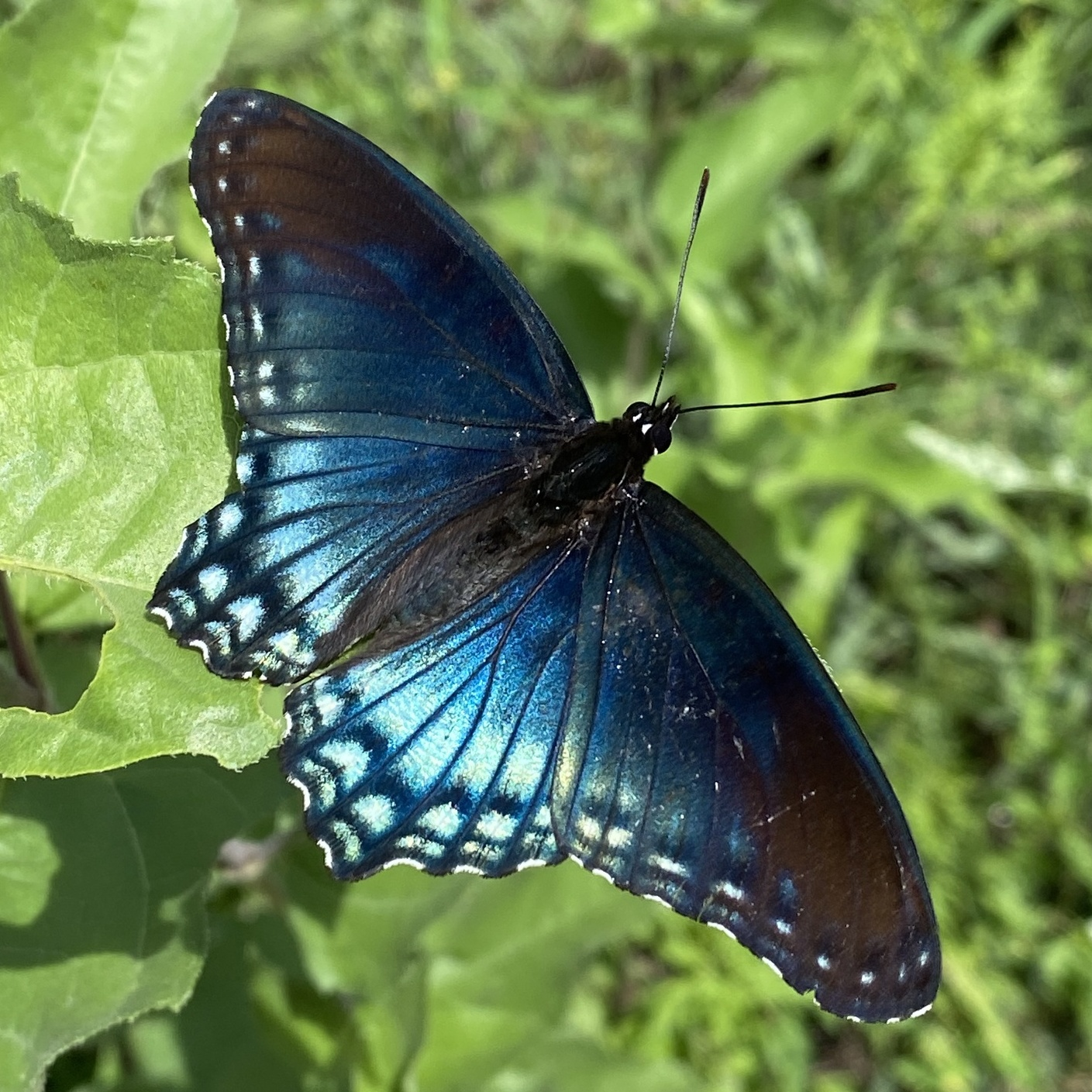
Red spotted purple (L. a. arizonensis)

This type of mimicry between species of the Limenitis arthemis is a prime example of convergent evolution, in which similar traits are developed among species in common niches or environment. Butterfly wing pattern is a trait often subjected to mimicry among species of different lineages because despite its diversity, the patterns are developed based upon a strict blueprint laid by preceding ground plans that were conserved throughout evolution. Though the exact mechanism by which the wing patterning developed remains unclear, there is evidence of genes associated with the eyespot patterning development. Yet, two conflicting ideas have been proposed to explain the mechanism involved: conserved homology or recent variability.

The red-spotted purple butterfly, also known as the subspecies L. arthemis astyanax, is a well known Batesian mimic. The palatable red-spotted purple mimics the unpalatable pipevine swallowtail (Battus philenor) with its overall dark wings with bright iridescent blue along the hind wings.

The two subspecies differ in the presence of a bright white band on both upper wings in the L. arthemis arthemis (non-mimic form).

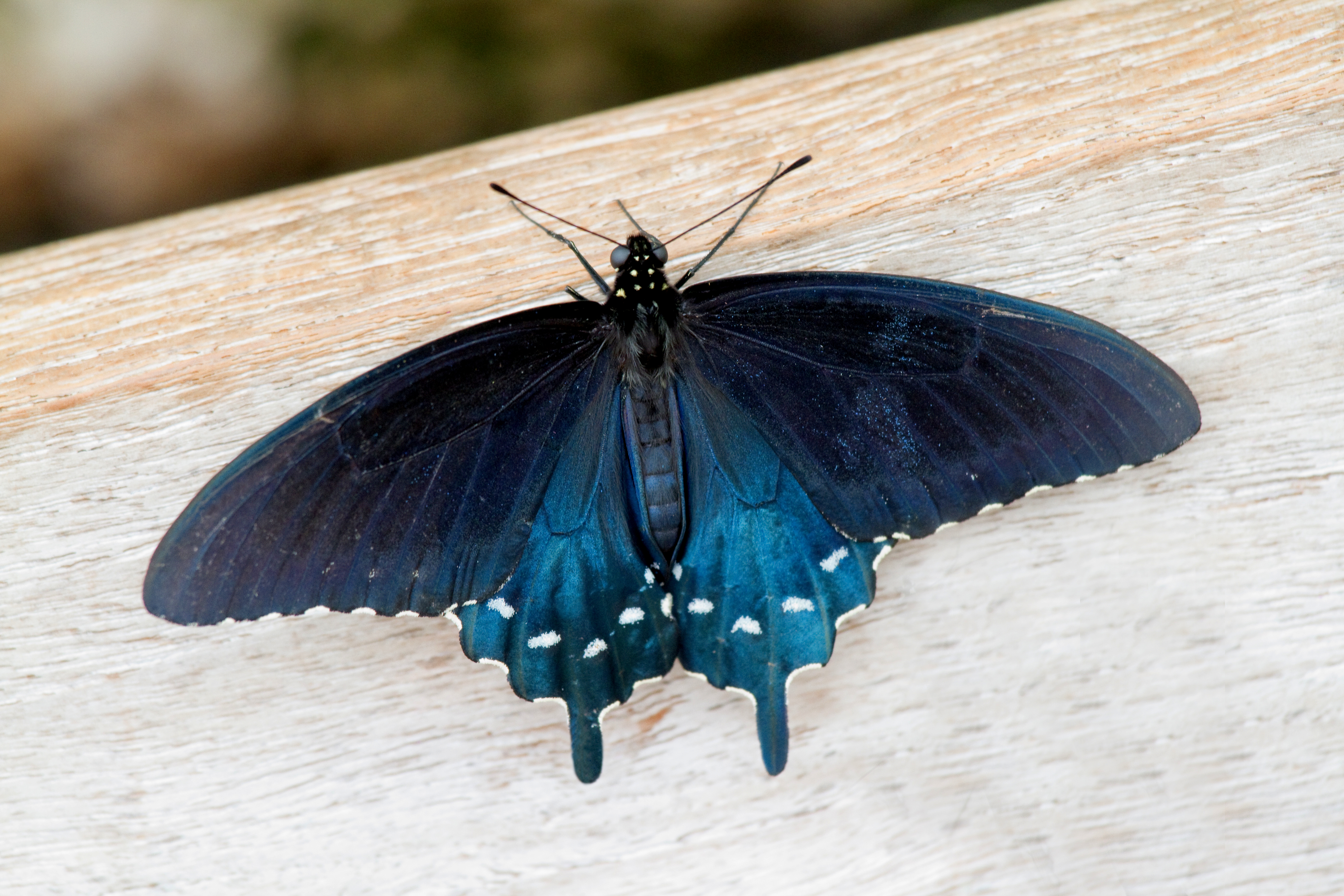
Pipevine swallowtail

A study hypothesized that the higher density of either model or mimic would cause a decrease in the effect of the mimicry in evading predators; however, this was not the case, since they showed that even with the lowest density of the model, the effectiveness of evading predators by the mimics did not decline.

A further study indicates that this phenomenon may be regulated by positionally orthologous nucleotide variants in the genome of these butterflies. Specifically, the gene WntA was found to be responsible for mimicry between L. arthemis and the pipevine swallowtail (Battus philenor), species that diverged more than 65 million years ago.

Another study ruled out a major hypothesis stating that the reappearance of the non-mimic form was due to the evolutionary loss of mimicry and a reversion to the ancestral phenotype. It showed that this hypothesis is most likely incorrect. These reasons included such significant levels of both contemporary and historical gene flow between the two phenotypic species that individual gene trees would not be accurate. In addition, past work on this hypothesis utilized mitochondrial DNA, which is an unreliable guide to phenotype.

Unlike previous studies which suggested that melanin pathway genes were responsible for variation in patterning and pigment expression, the WntA pathway is a crucial part of the early development of embryos and therefore highly conserved between species; thus making it the most likely candidate responsible for the evolution of mimicry in L. arthemis.

== Ecology ==
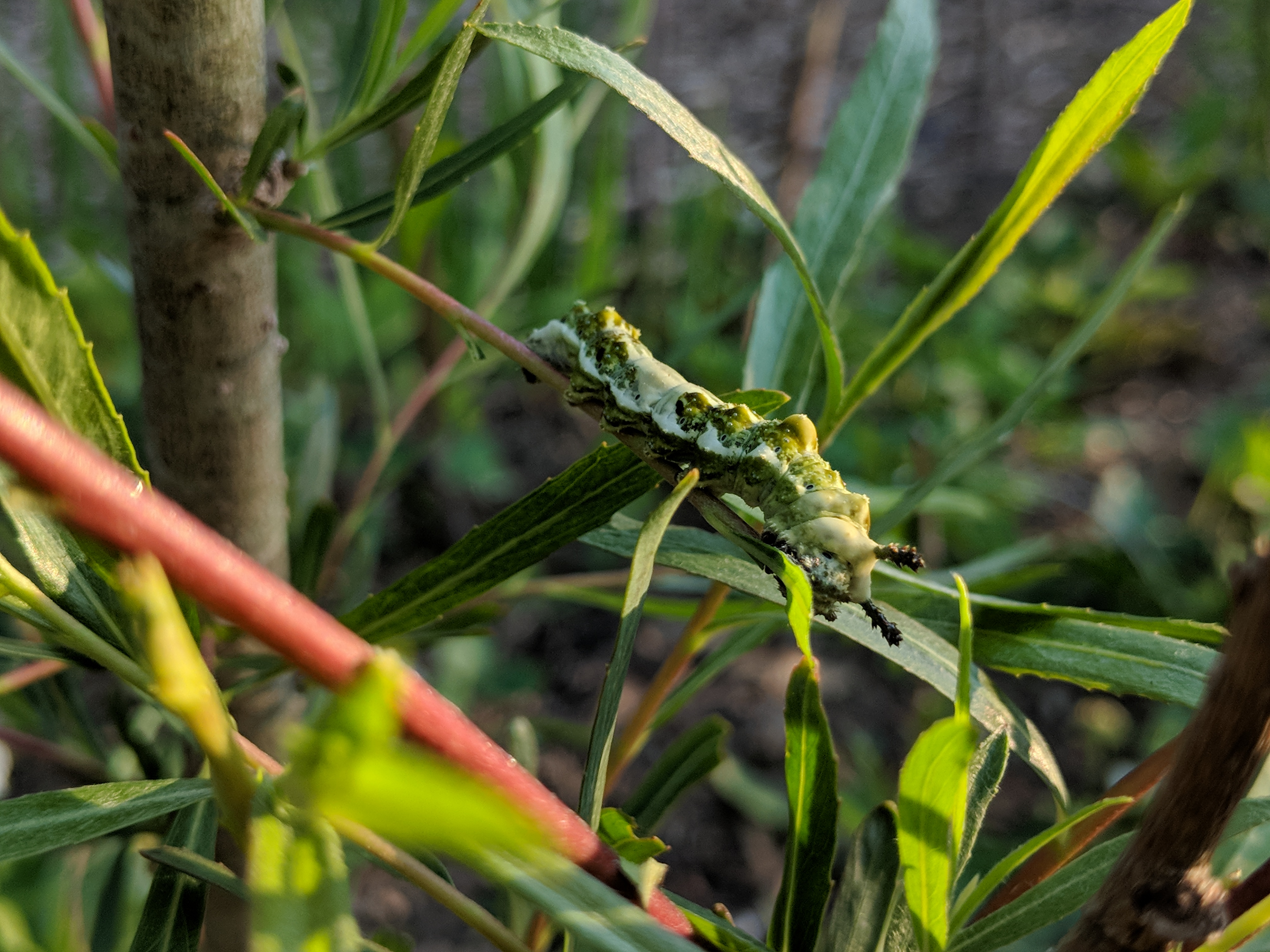
Caterpillar feeding on a willow tree

Preferred host plants: birches, including Betula lenta; Salicaceae, including Salix bebbiana and Populus tremuloides, and Prunus virginiana (Rosaceae).

Also but not as often: Crataegus, Amelanchier, Malus pumila, Prunus pensylvanica and Prunus serotina (Rosaceae), Populus deltoides, P. grandidentata and P. balsamifera (Salicaceae), Alnus rugosa, Betula alleghaniensis and Carpinus caroliniana (Betulaceae), Ulmus americana (Ulmaceae), Tilia americana (Malvaceae) and Fagus grandifolia (Fagaceae).

== Food resources ==
=== Caterpillars ===
Caterpillars of the hybrid region generally feed on tree species in the plant family Salicaceae, including aspen, poplar, and willow trees. Those of the northern region generally feed extensively on yellow birch trees, including Betula aleghaniensis and Betula lenta. Southern caterpillars feed on black cherry (Prunus serotina) and other members of the Rosaceae family.

=== Adults ===
The adult diet generally includes rotting fruit and nectar from small white flowers.

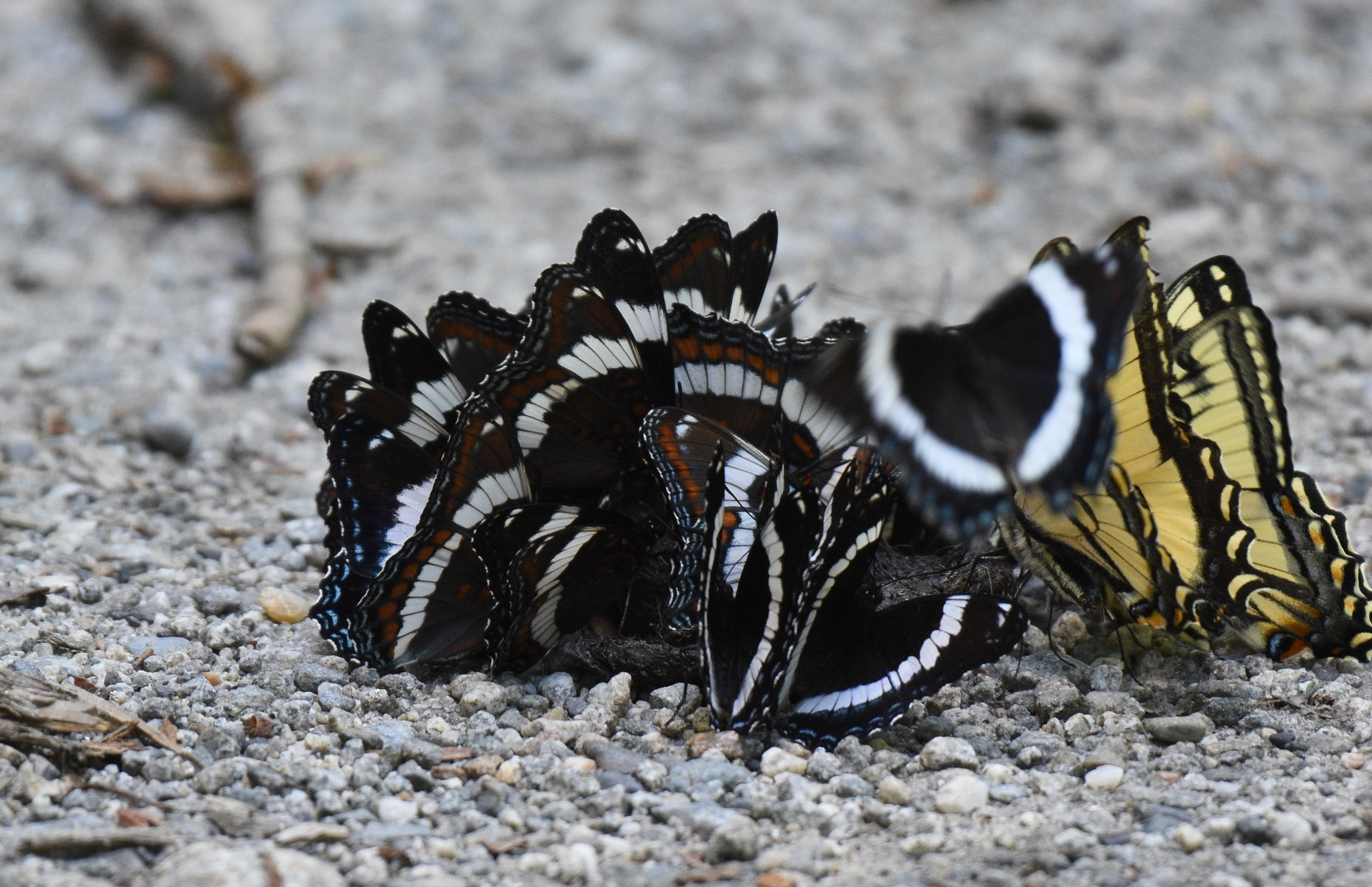
L. a. arthemis puddling on scat

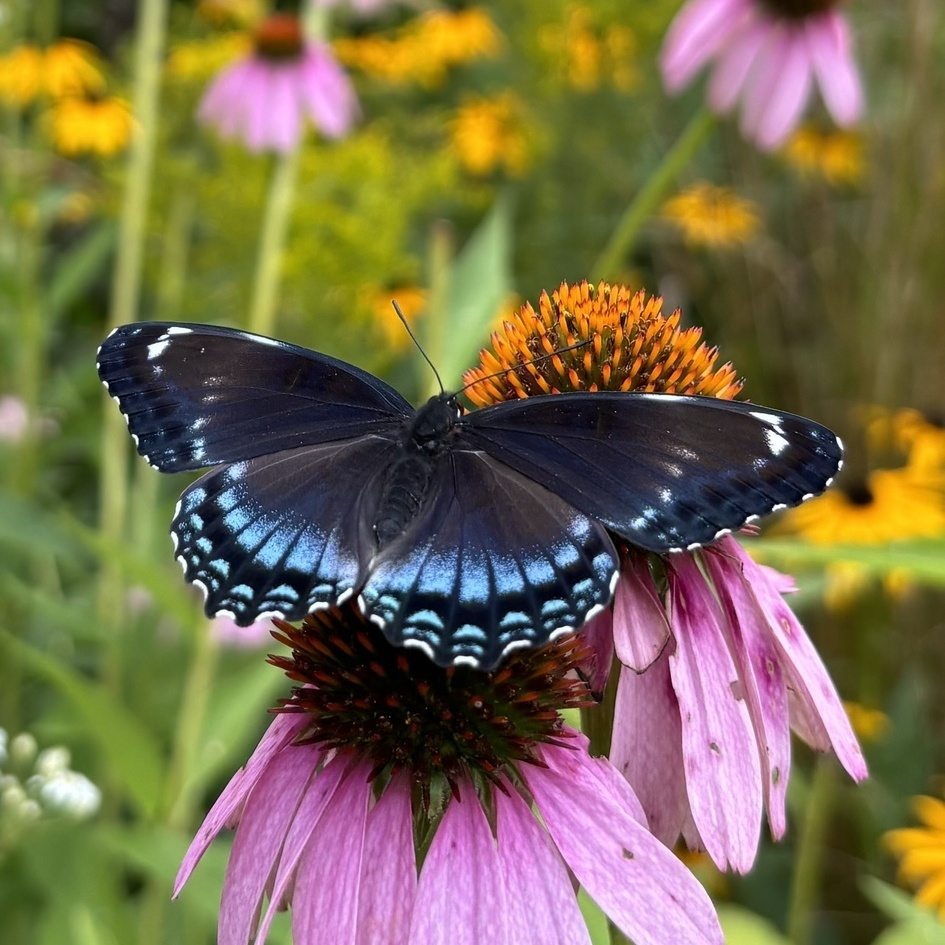
L. a. arthemis × astyanax feeding on Echinacea, in Maine

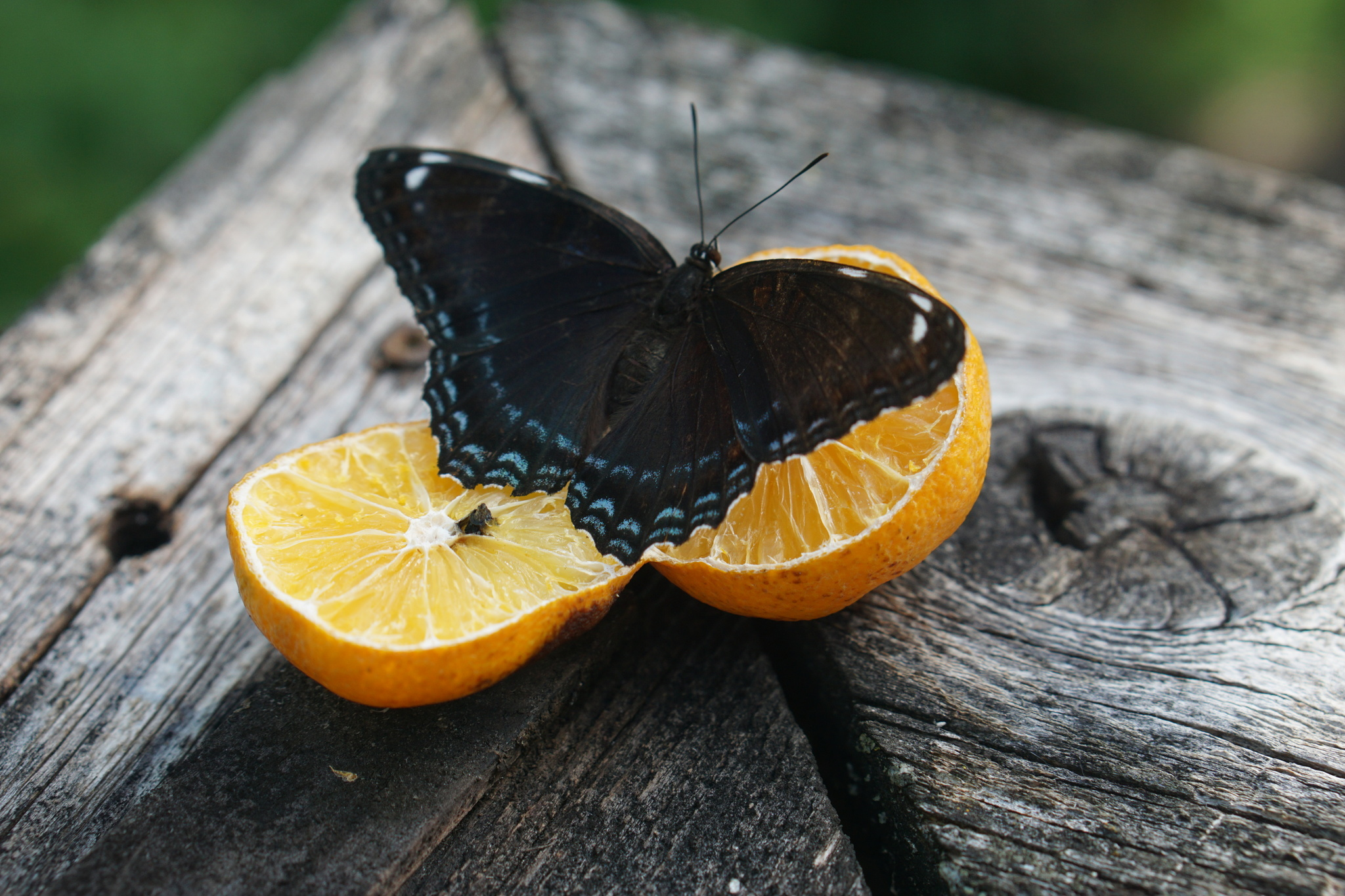
L. a. arthemis × astyanax feeding on an orange, in Minnesota

== Life history ==
=== Oviposition ===
Females lay eggs on leaves of food plants (see Food Resources for details), specifically at the very tips of these leaves, to the point where the width of the egg and that of the leaf are the same. These plants are about two to three feet off the ground. Mother undergoes labor for several weeks, laying only a few eggs per day; this is implied as more and more worn-out females are found.

=== Life cycle ===
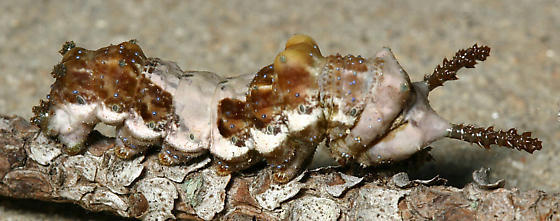
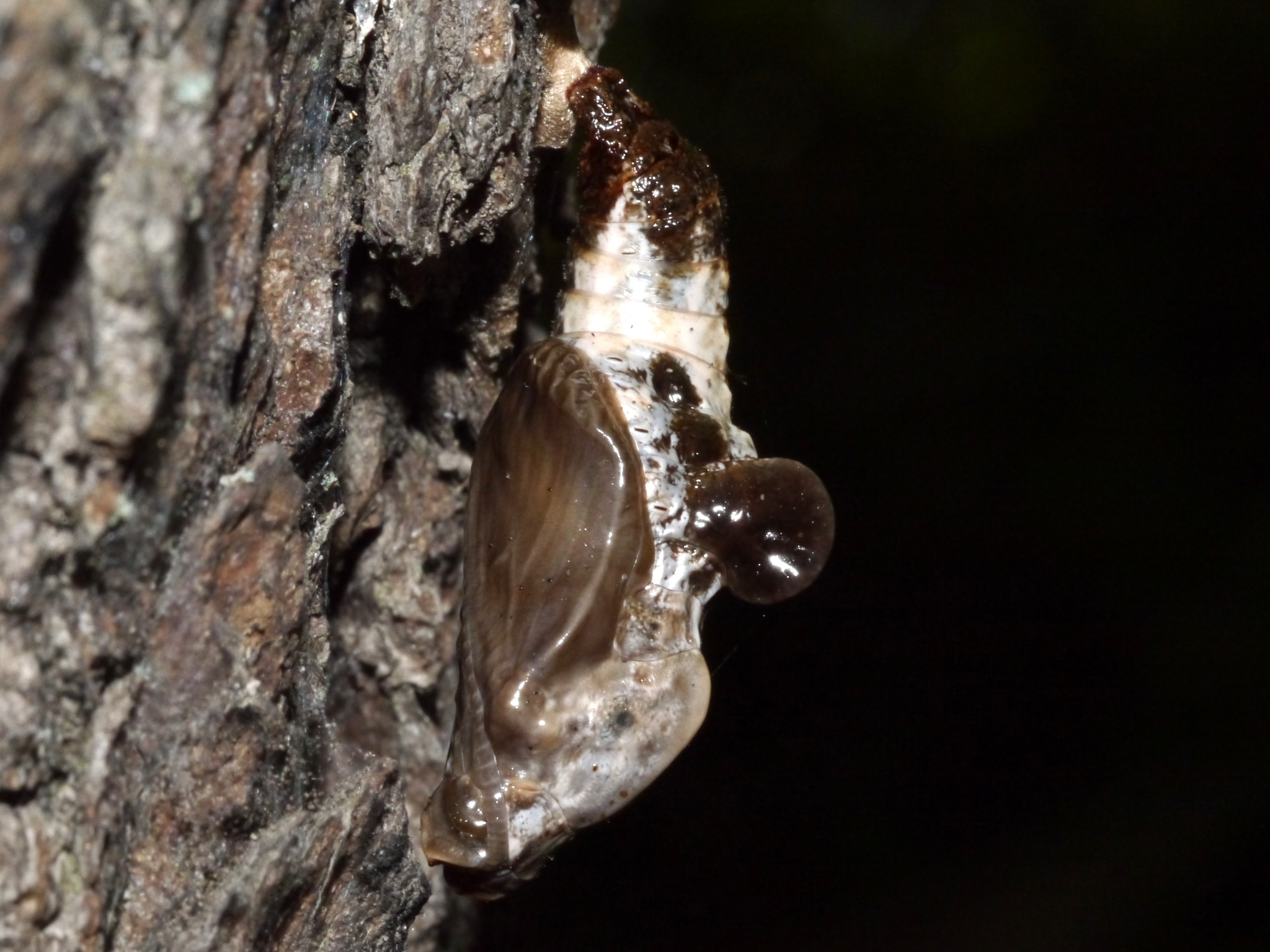
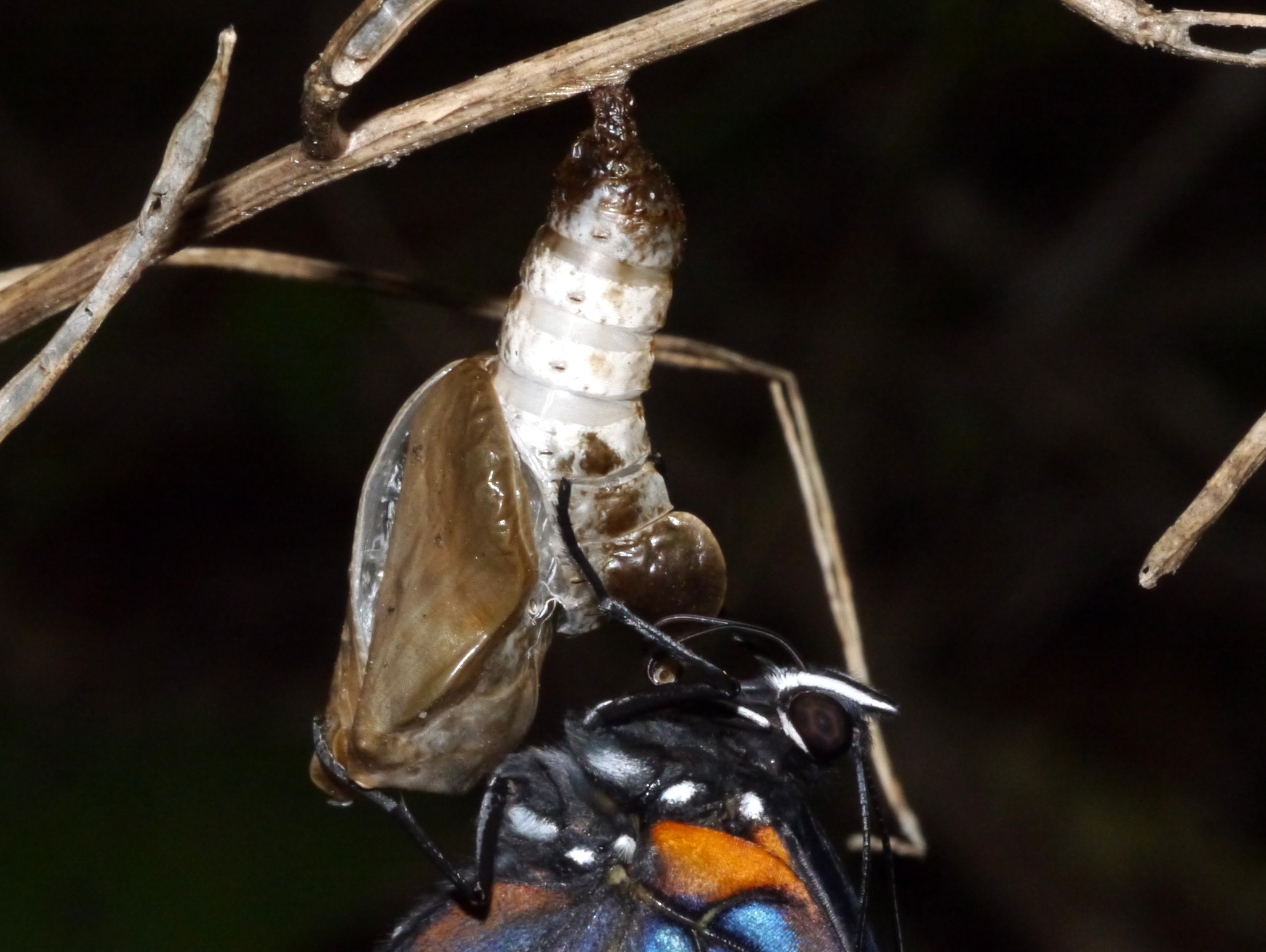
Larva (top), pupa (middle), emerging adult (bottom)

Limenitis arthemis have two broods lasting from April to October. Most of the first brood feed and grow until the caterpillar is half-grown. Then they form a hibernaculum and hibernate for the winter until the start of spring. However, some larvae are able to mature during the summer, so they emerge as the second brood early fall. The second brood also mate and lay eggs, but often these larvae are not yet mature enough to undergo hibernation. Ultimately, this could mean death for the larvae.

==== Egg ====
Lasting about seven days, the eggs have a grey-green color with kite-shaped cells surrounding a central circular structure.

==== Caterpillar ====
Lasting a couple of weeks after hatching, L. arthemis larvae have wood brown heads with dark brown and yellow bordered bodies. Mature larvae are deep brownish-olive color with faint white midsections on their dorsal sides. The legs and prolegs are red-brown. Third stage larvae undergo hibernation at start of winter.

==== Pupa ====
Pupa stage lasts approximately 10–14 days. The chrysalis varies in color from a creamy white to silvery gray.

==== Adult ====
Adult butterflies, if part of first brood, are usually flying by mid-June. Adults are diurnal, meaning they fly from the morning until soon after dusk. Life as an adult lasts approximately 6 to 14 days.

== Mating ==
When males are searching for mates, they generally try to defend areas that have high female visitation rates, regardless of the amount of resources. Male L. arthemis are known to be very aggressive when it comes down to defending an area bountiful of female mates. Male residents perch under the sun until another male comes into the vicinity; these engagements generally last approximately 1–5 minutes. Once conflicts comes to an end, males periodically patrol their territory for other outsiders tempted to take over the territory. Males also have high fidelity to the territory they are defending.

=== Mate searching behavior ===
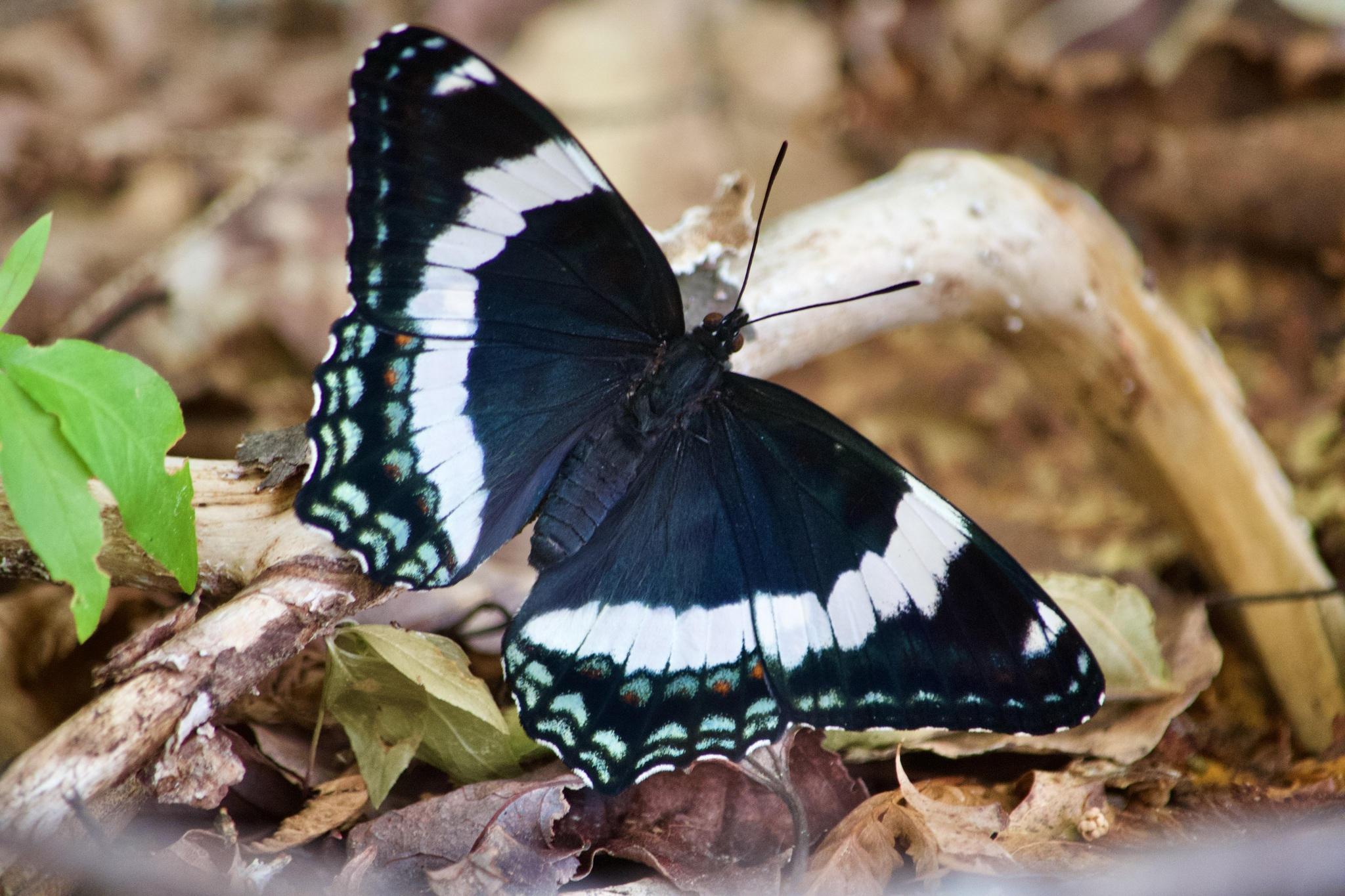
L. a. arthemis, New Hampshire

When males are searching for female mates, they tend to seek territories with plentiful visits from females. Mate-locating behaviors for males tended to start in the afternoon, between 11 am and 4 pm. Most males perched as a sign of defense of the territory. Males tend not to favor perching on host trees, but rather on various kinds of foliage like maple, elm trees, or raspberry bushes, generally about 1–2 meters off the ground. This particular mating behavior seems ironic because males should want to perch on host trees as females tend to seek mates in areas where resources like food or host trees are bountiful. Therefore, many times, males are defending areas that do not attract the most females.

=== Male-male behavior ===
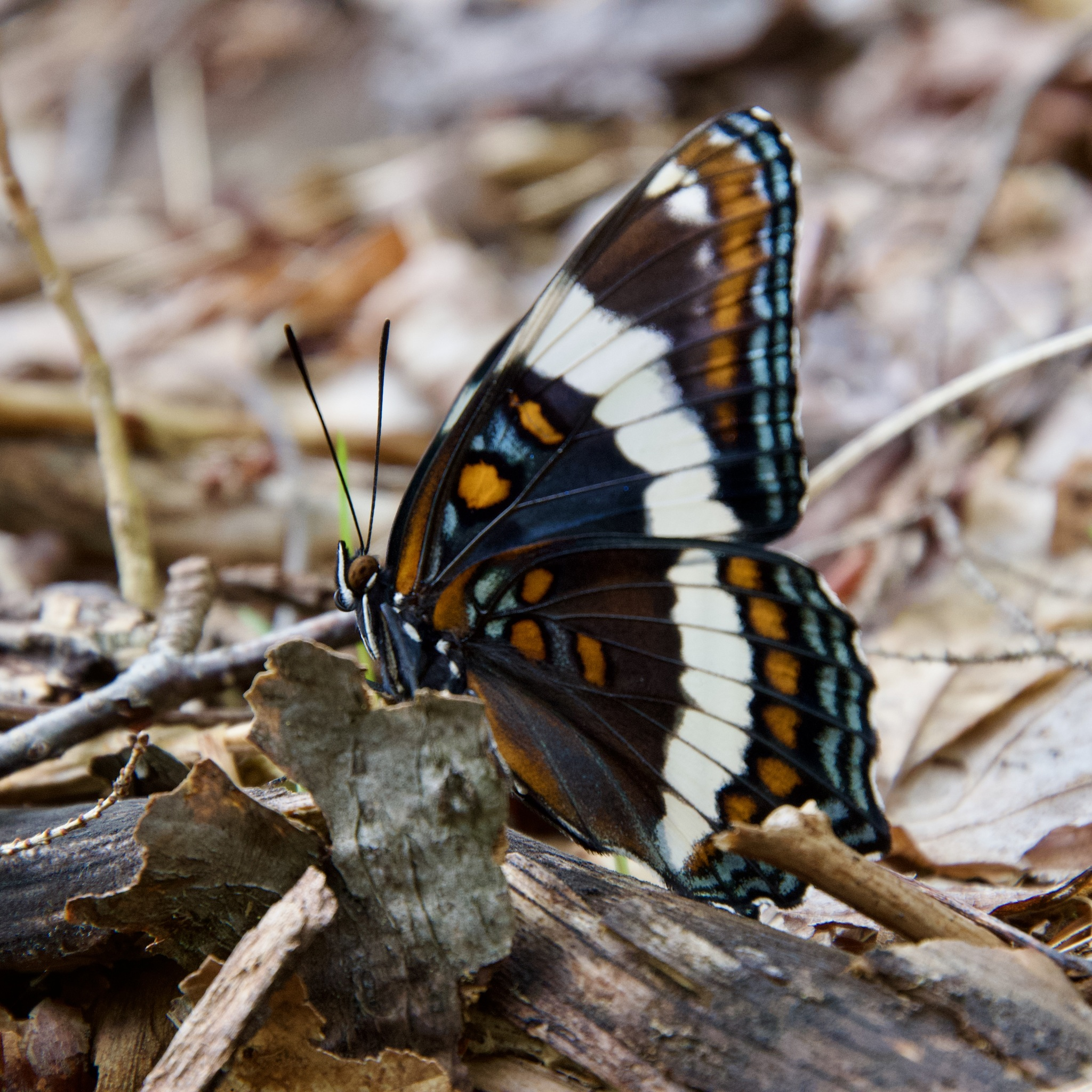
L. a. arthemis, New Hampshire

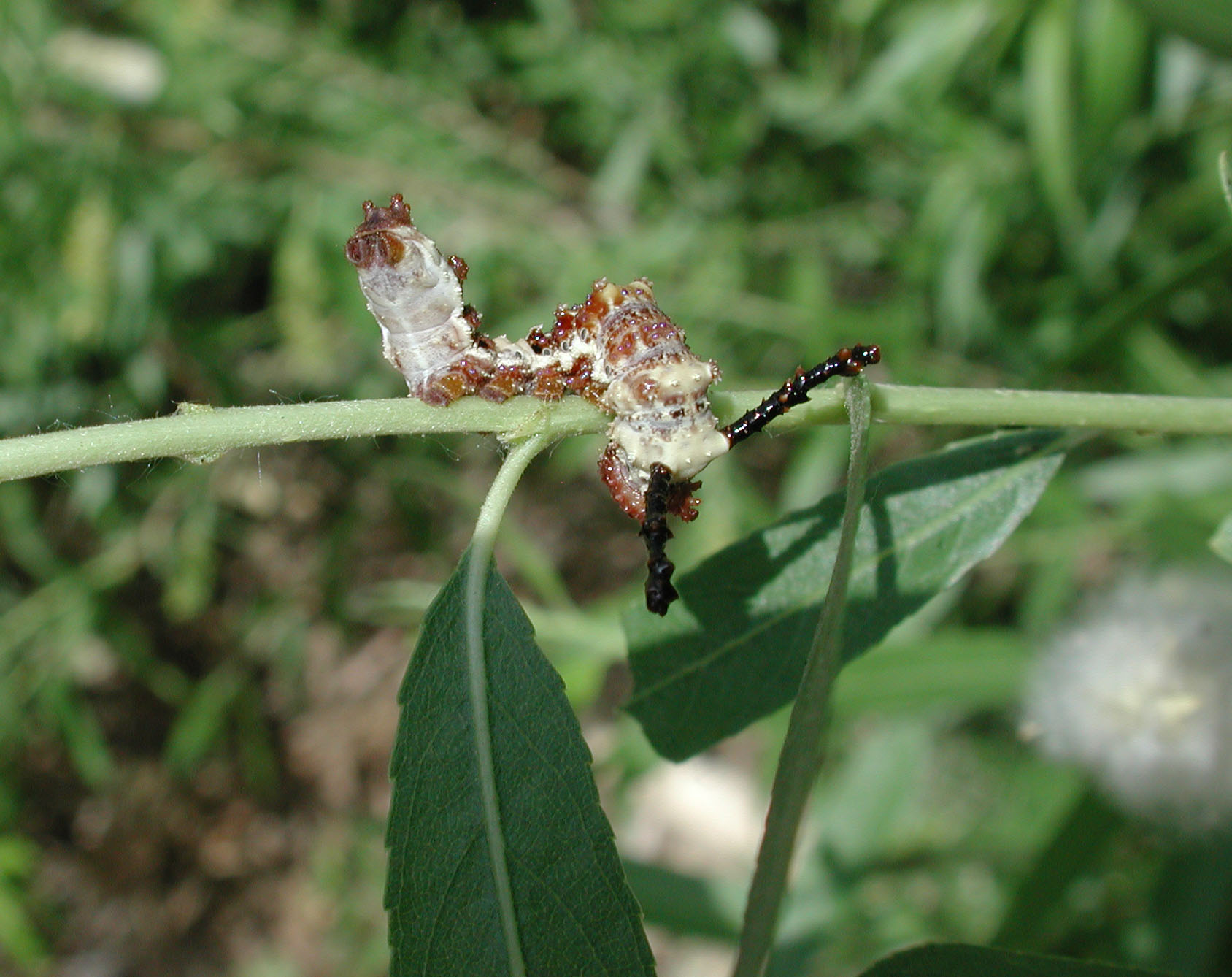
3rd instar larva of L. a. arizonensis

Males tend to display aggressive behavior with each other during territorial fights. Fights have been classified into two types: 1) jostling, which are contests over eclosed or eclosing females and 2) aerial maneuvers, which are fought over ownership of mating territories in a specific breeding ground. These fights are significant due to the ability of female butterflies to "double-mate" which introduce the idea of sperm precedence and competition to reproduce between males. A study showed that within female butterflies that "double-mate" a small percent of the progeny resulted from the mixing of sperm, which illustrate the individual fitness of the male. Therefore, there is an incentive for males to claim their mate prior to other males, which can also affect male mate-seeking strategies as well. Generally, the fights engaged by L. arthemis are aerial maneuvers which are initiated once a nonresident male files into his peripheral vision. After which a series of flight patterns such as circling flights, vertical and/or horizontal chases, and hovering flights ensue. It is established that the "competition" component of the fight is the circling flight, often followed by the horizontal chase in which the 'loser' is chased from the disputed territory. Territorial fights are not limited to mating, but it is a method to optimize their mate-seeking behavior.

=== Female-male behavior ===
Once a female lands on a leaf, the male lands behind her quite shortly after. If the female does not want to copulate, she closes her dorsal wings.

== In popular culture ==
The white admiral is the official state butterfly of New York. Limenitis arthemis arthemis is also considered by some to be the unofficial insect emblem of Quebec; a bill to officially recognize it received initial approval from the National Assembly of Quebec in early 2026, going on to further consideration.

== Gallery ==
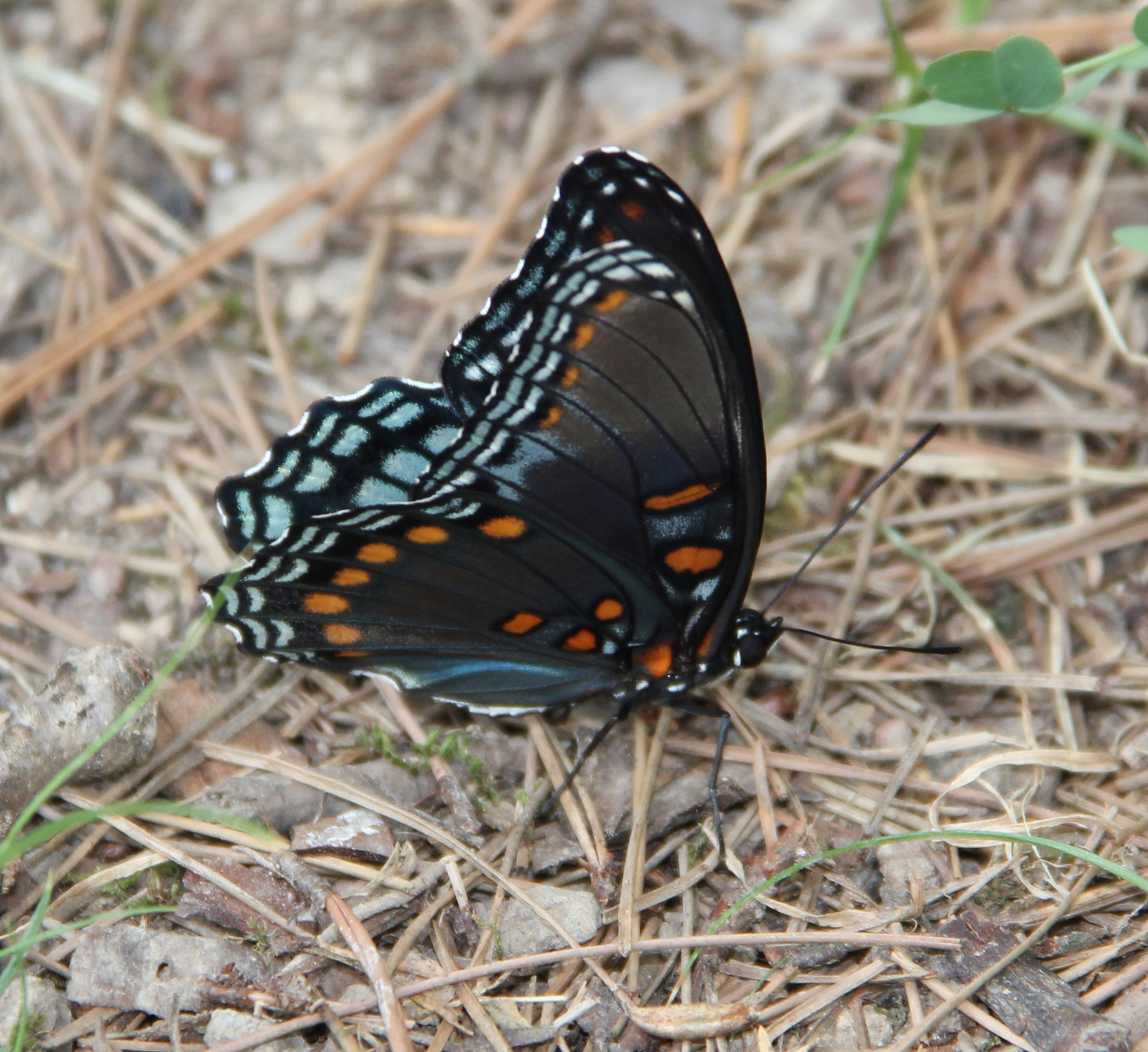
Side view of L. a. astyanax, Hot Springs National Park, Arkansas, United States

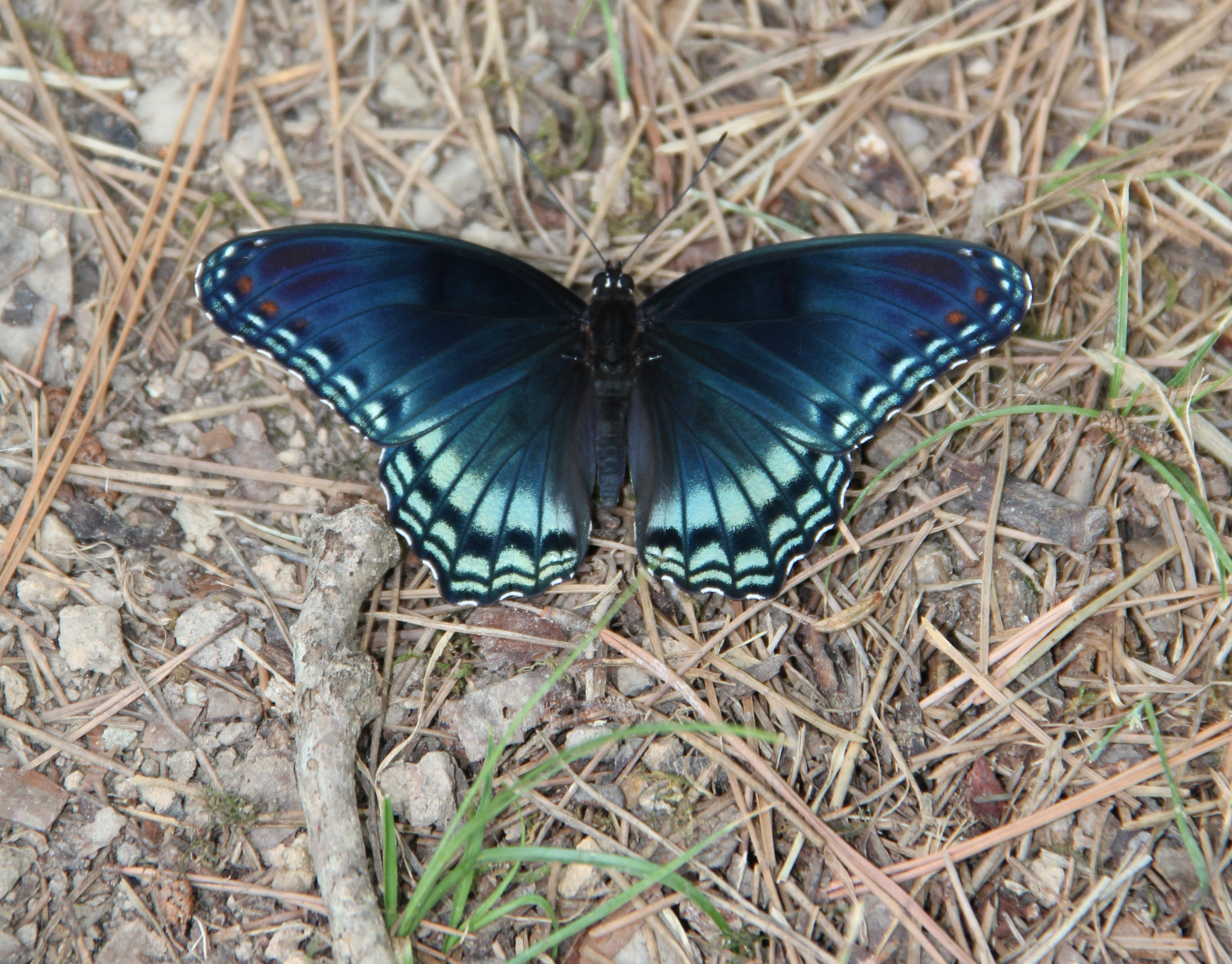
Back view of L. a. astyanax, Hot Springs National Park, Arkansas, United States

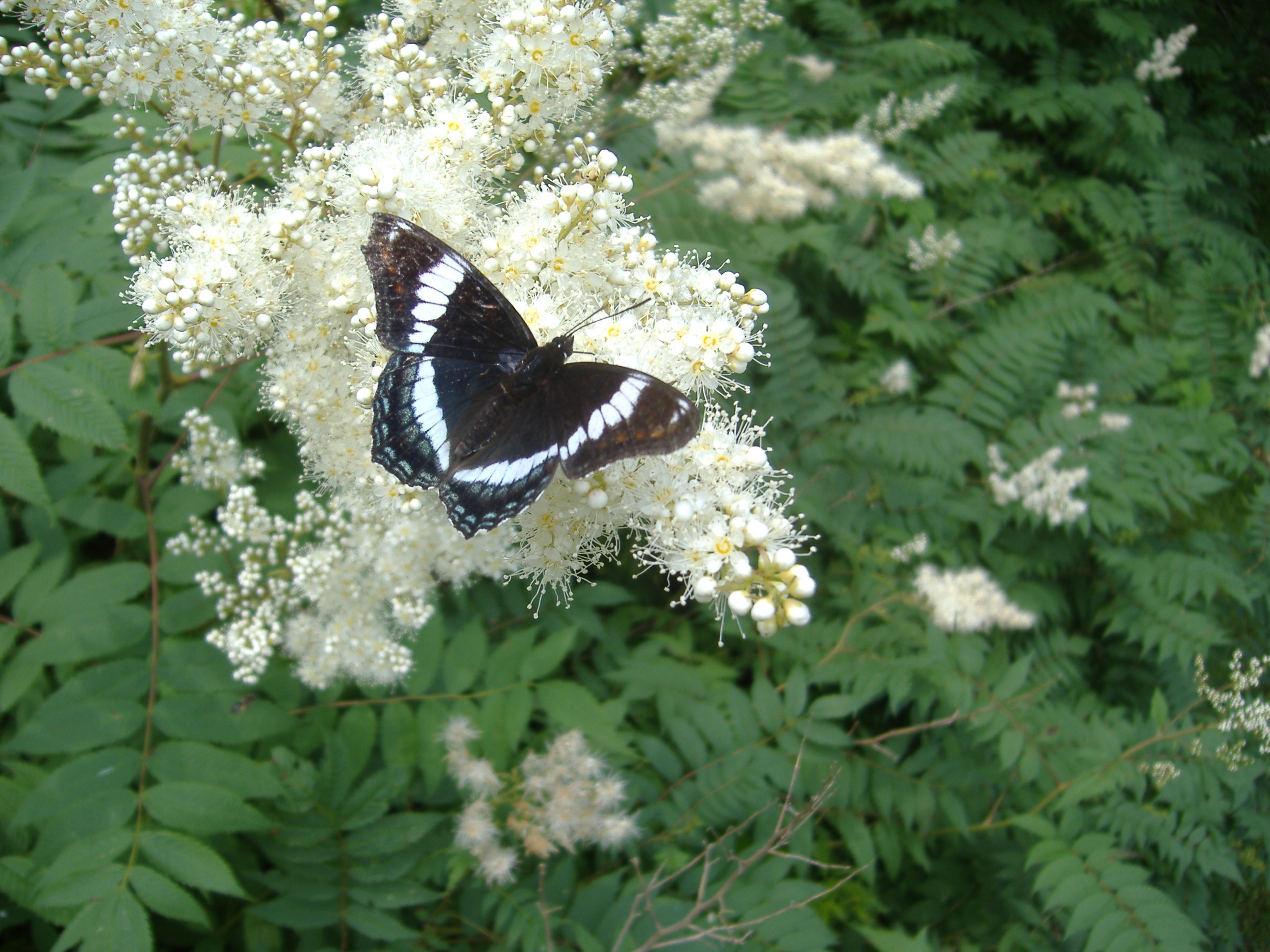
White admiral in southern Maine

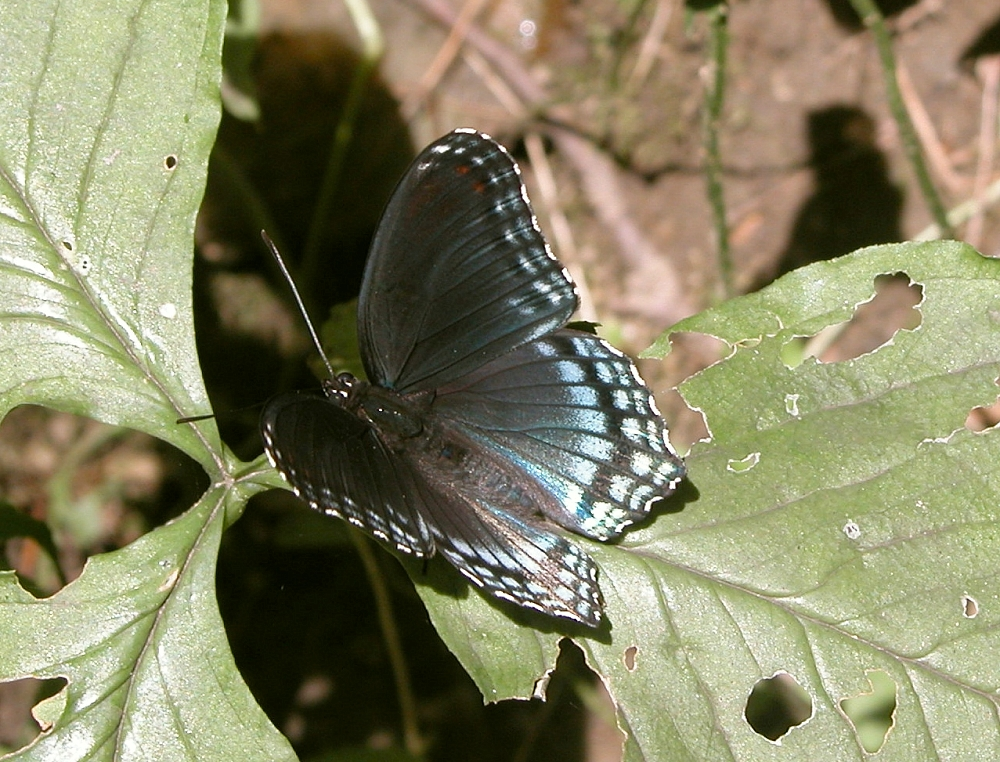
Red-spotted purple (L. a. astyanax), Baltimore, Maryland, United States

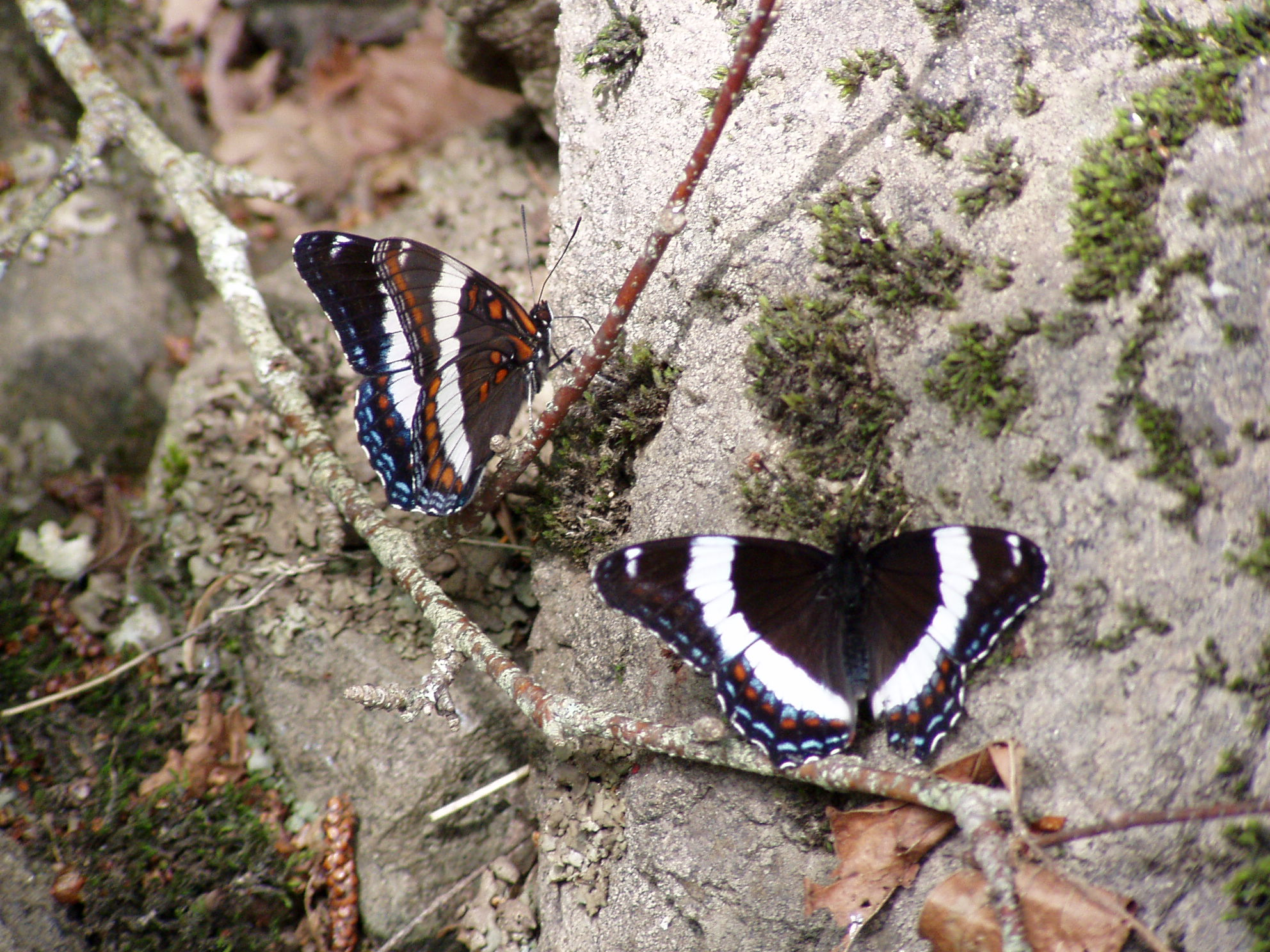
L. a. arthemis, New Brunswick, Canada

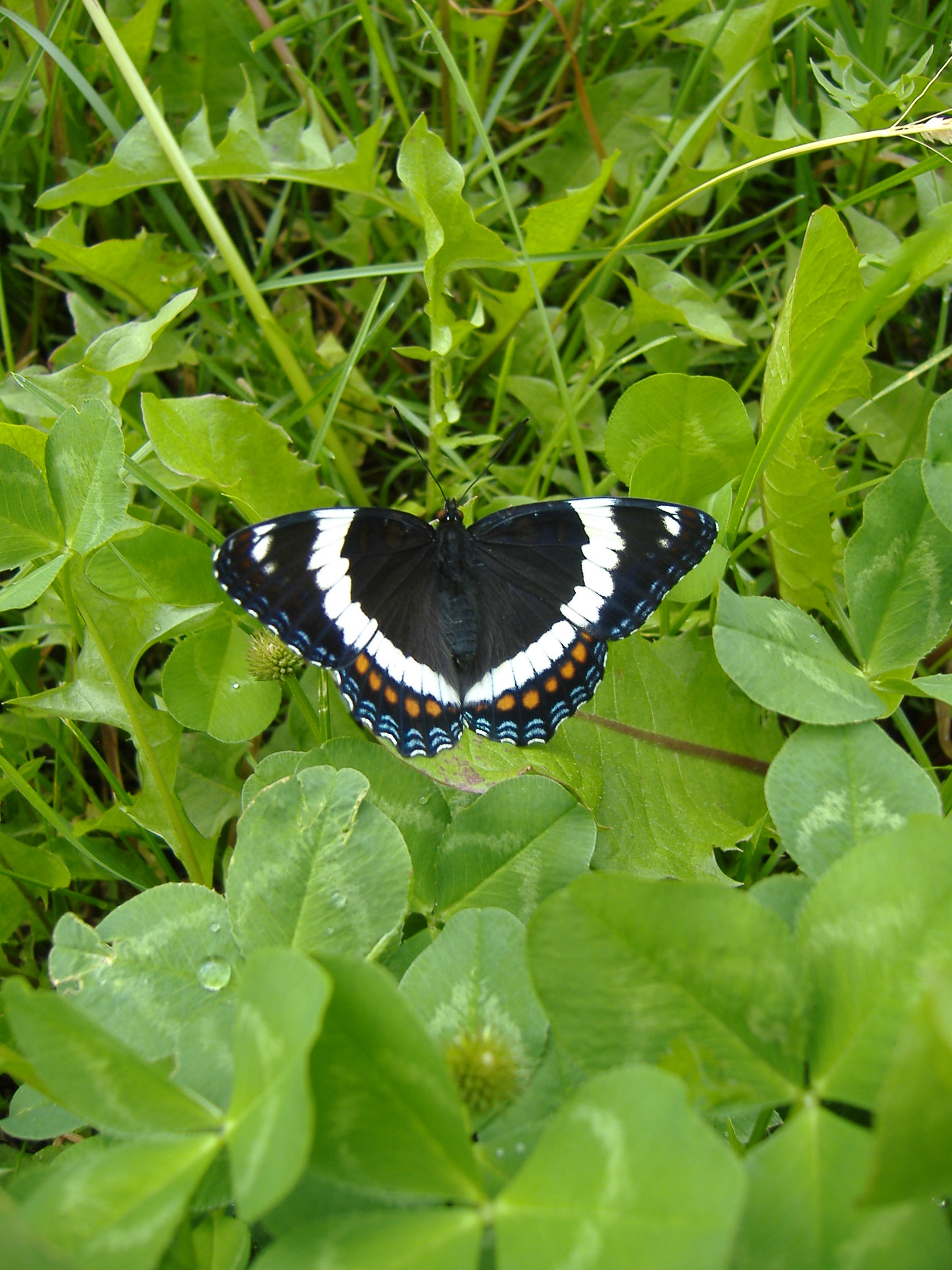
L. a. rubrofasciata in Saskatoon, Saskatchewan, Canada

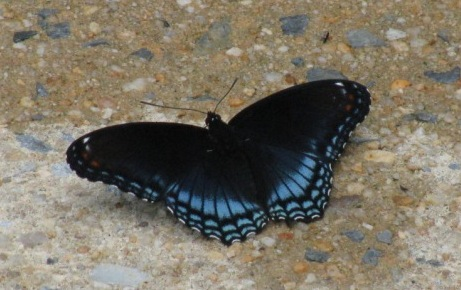
Red-spotted purple (L. a. astyanax), Pennsylvania, United States

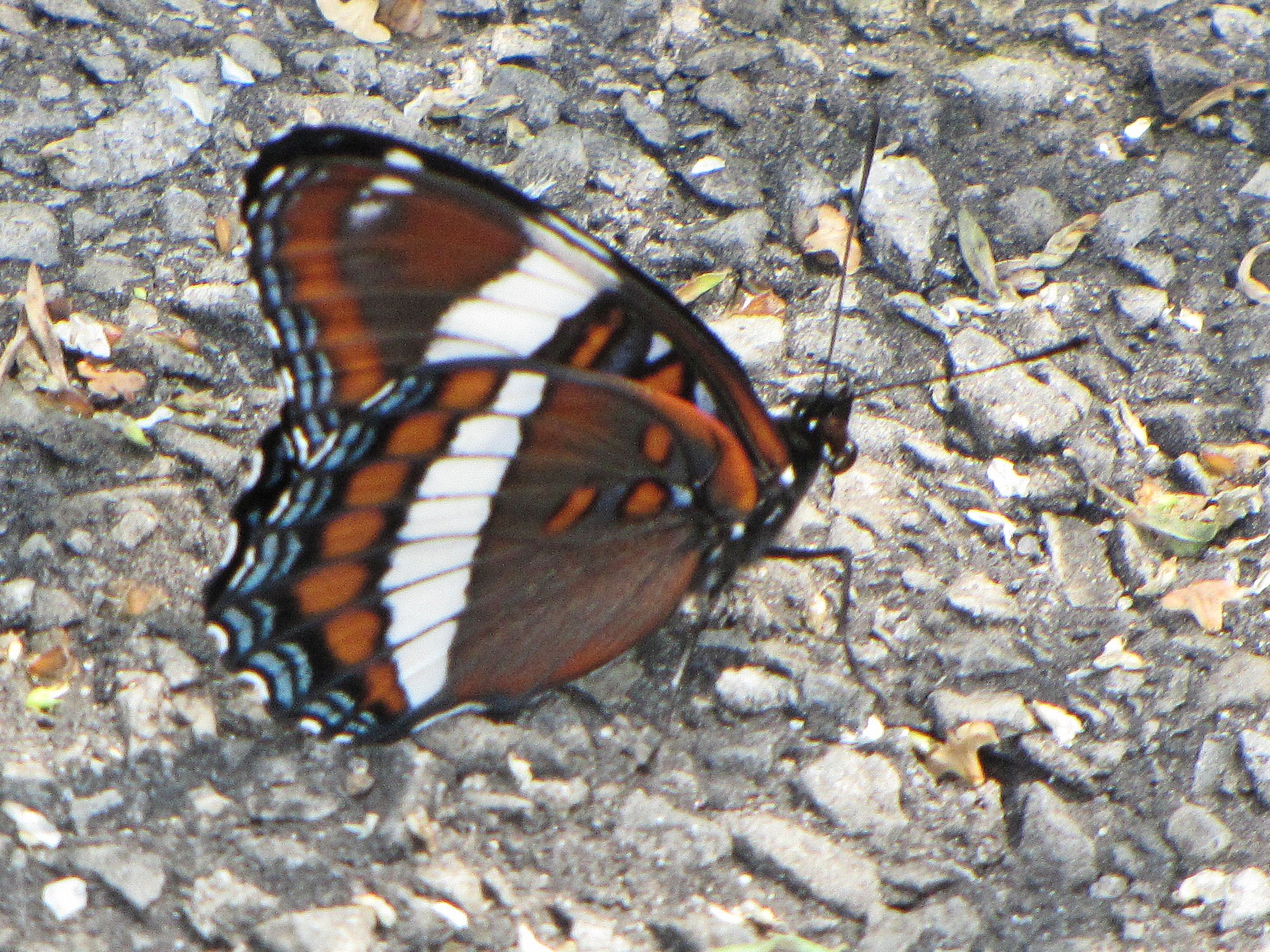
L. a. arthemis, ventral, Ottawa, Ontario

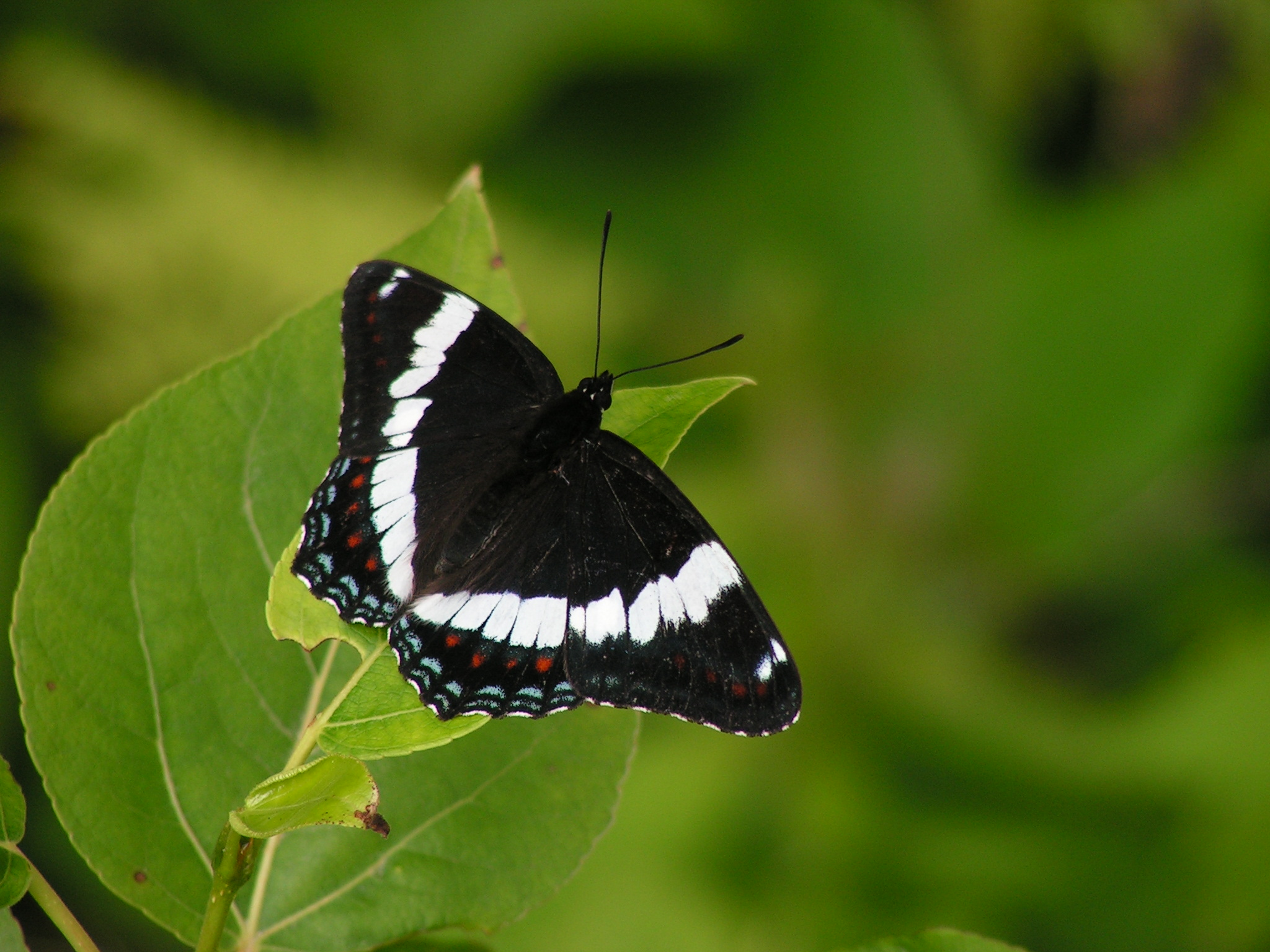
L. a. arthemis, Quebec

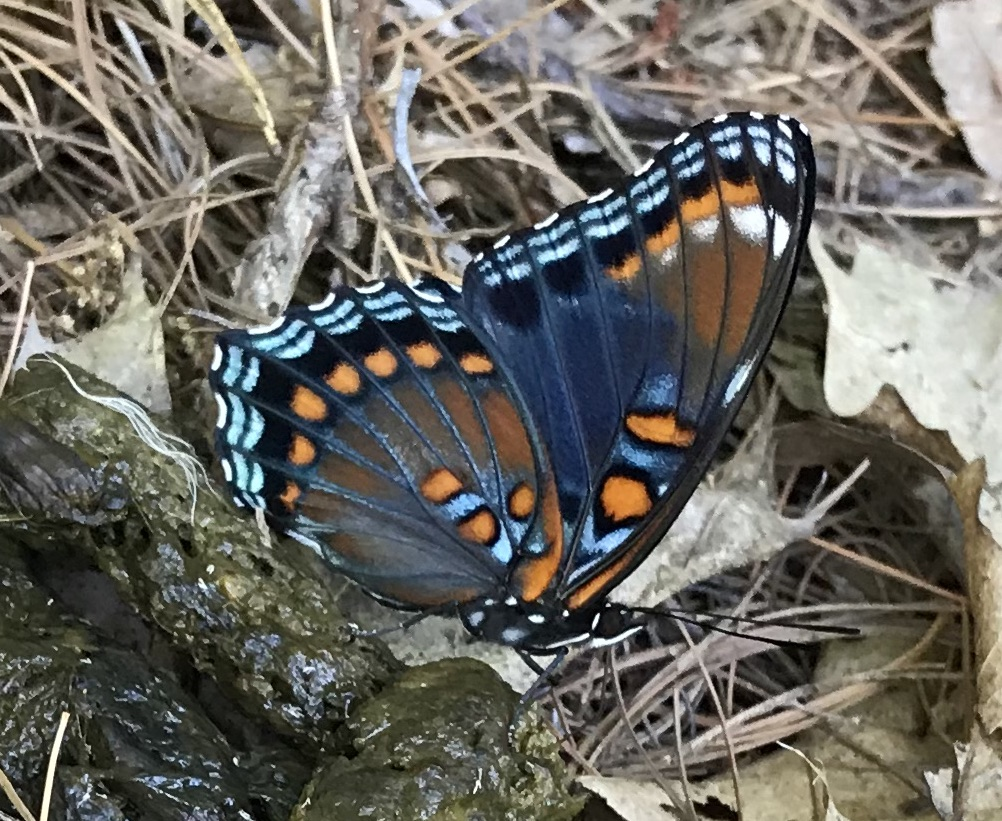
Red-spotted purple, Massachusetts, United States

== See also ==
- White admiral (disambiguation)
