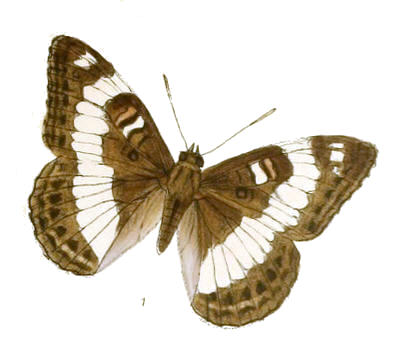

Scientific classification
- Domain: Eukaryota
- Kingdom: Animalia
- Phylum: Arthropoda
- Class: Insecta
- Order: Lepidoptera
- Family: Nymphalidae
- Genus: Limenitis
- Species: L. trivena

Binomial name
- Limenitis trivena (Moore, 1864)

= Limenitis trivena =

Indian white admiral

Species of butterfly

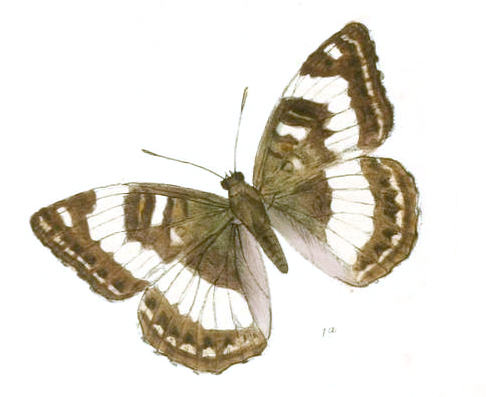

Limenitis trivena, the Indian white admiral, is a species of nymphalid butterfly found in tropical and subtropical Asia.

== See also ==
- White admiral (disambiguation)
