= List of casinos in the United States =

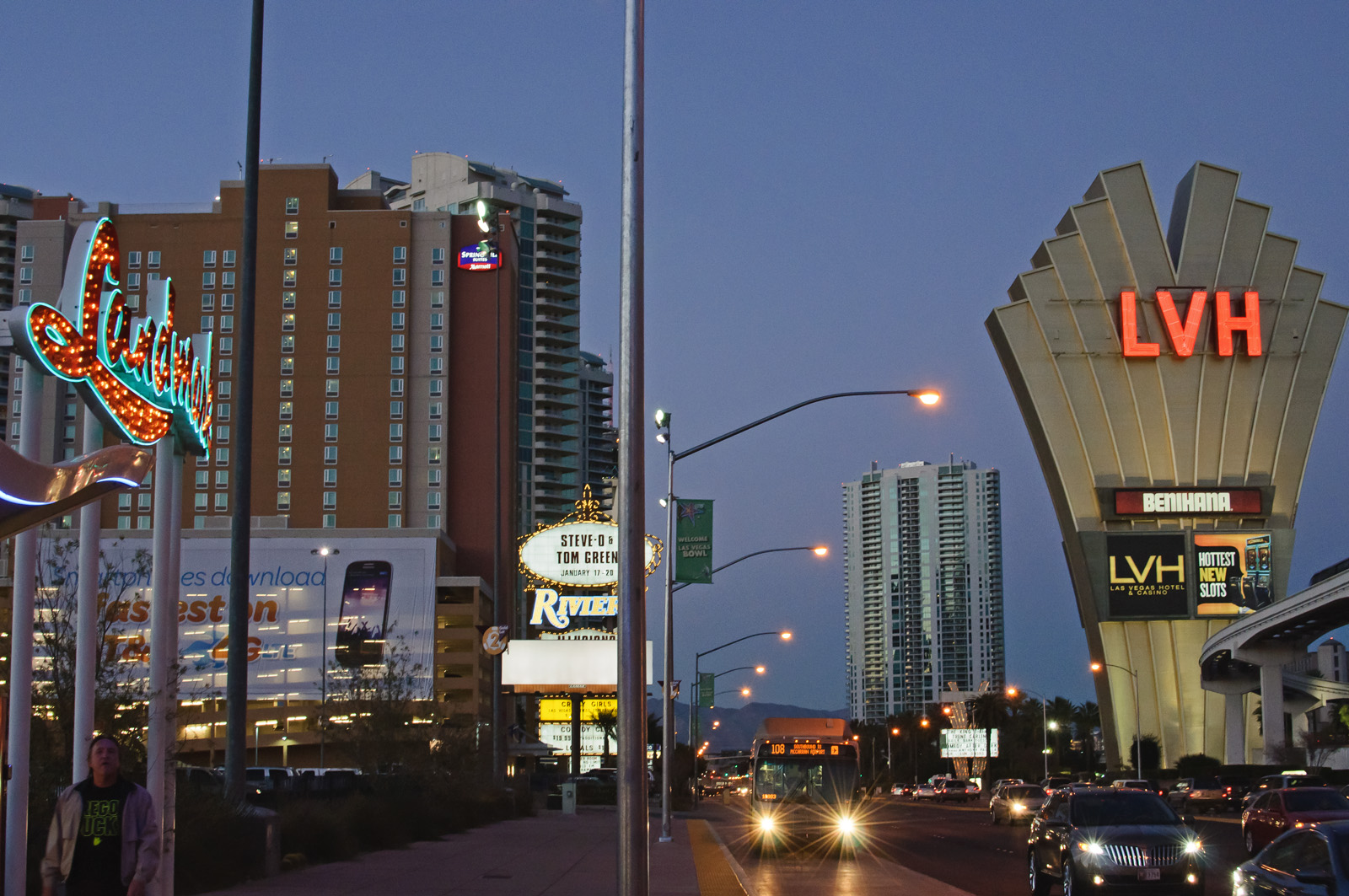
Casinos on Paradise Road in Winchester, Nevada in 2013

This is a list of casinos in the United States.

== Lists by locale ==
=== City ===
- List of Atlantic City casinos that never opened
- List of Las Vegas casinos that never opened

=== State ===
- List of casinos in Alabama
- List of casinos in Arizona
- List of casinos in Arkansas
- List of casinos in California
- List of casinos in Colorado
- List of casinos in Delaware
- List of casinos in Florida
- List of casinos in Idaho
- List of casinos in Illinois
- List of casinos in Indiana
- List of casinos in Iowa
- List of casinos in Kansas
- List of casinos in Louisiana
- List of casinos in Maine
- List of casinos in Maryland
- List of casinos in Massachusetts
- List of casinos in Michigan
- List of casinos in Minnesota
- List of casinos in Mississippi
- List of casinos in Missouri
- List of casinos in Nevada
- List of casinos in New Jersey
- List of casinos in New Mexico
- List of casinos in New York
- List of casinos in North Dakota
- List of casinos in Ohio
- List of casinos in Oklahoma
- List of casinos in Oregon
- List of casinos in Pennsylvania
- List of casinos in South Dakota
- List of casinos in Washington
- List of casinos in West Virginia
- List of casinos in Wisconsin
- List of casinos in Wyoming

=== Territory ===
- List of casinos in Puerto Rico
- List of casinos in the United States Virgin Islands

== List of casinos ==
=== Organized by state ===
Casino	City	County	State	District	Type	Comments
Victoryland	Shorter	Macon	Alabama		Land-based	Greyhound racing ended in 2011; no table games
Wind Creek Casino & Hotel Atmore	Atmore	Escambia	Alabama		Native American	Owned by the Poarch Band of Creek Indians; no table games
Wind Creek Casino & Hotel Montgomery	Montgomery	Montgomery	Alabama		Native American	Owned by the Poarch Band of Creek Indians; no table games
Wind Creek Casino & Hotel Wetumpka	Wetumpka	Elmore	Alabama		Native American	Owned by the Poarch Band of Creek Indians; no table games
Apache Gold Casino Resort	San Carlos	Gila	Arizona		Land-based	Owned by the San Carlos Apache
Apache Sky Casino	Dudleyville	Pinal	Arizona		Land-based	Owned by the San Carlos Apache
BlueWater Resort and Casino	Parker	La Paz	Arizona		Land-based	Owned by the Colorado River Indian Tribes; Wakeboard park located on premises
Bucky's Casino	Prescott	Yavapai	Arizona		Land-based	Owned by the Yavapai-Prescott Tribe
Casino Arizona	Scottsdale	Maricopa	Arizona		Land-based	Owned by the Salt River Pima–Maricopa
Casino del Sol	Tucson	Pima	Arizona		Land-based	Owned by the Pascua Yaqui Tribe
Casino of the Sun	Tucson	Pima	Arizona		Land-based	Owned by the Pascua Yaqui Tribe
Cliff Castle Casino	Camp Verde	Yavapai	Arizona		Land-based	Owned by the Yavapai–Apache Nation
Cocopah Resort Casino	Somerton	Yuma	Arizona		Land-based	Owned by the Cocopah Indian Tribe
Desert Diamond Casino	Why	Pima	Arizona	Hickiwan	Land-based	Owned by the Tohono Oʼodham Nation; formerly known as Golden Hassan Casino
Desert Diamond Casino, Sahuarita	Sahuarita	Pima	Arizona	San Xavier	Land-based	Owned by the Tohono Oʼodham Nation
Desert Diamond Casino–West Valley	Glendale	Maricopa	Arizona	San Lucy	Land-based	Owned by the Tohono Oʼodham Nation
Desert Diamond Casino–White Tanks	Waddell	Maricopa	Arizona		Land-based	Owned by the Tohono Oʼodham Nation
Desert Diamond Hotel & Casino	Tucson	Pima	Arizona	San Xavier	Land-based	Owned by the Tohono Oʼodham Nation
We-Ko-Pa Casino & Resort	Fountain Hills	Maricopa	Arizona		Land-based	Owned by the Fort McDowell Yavapai Nation
Harrah's Ak-Chin Casino	Maricopa	Pinal	Arizona		Land-based	Owned by the Ak-Chin Indian Community
Hon-Dah Resort Casino	Pinetop-Lakeside	Navajo	Arizona		Land-based	Owned by the White Mountain Apache Tribe
Lone Butte Casino	Chandler	Maricopa	Arizona		Land-based	Owned by the Gila River Indian Community; renovated in 2015
Mazatzal Casino	Payson	Gila	Arizona		Land-based	Owned by the Tonto Apache
Paradise Casino	Yuma	Yuma	Arizona		Land-based	Owned by the Quechan Tribe
Santan Mountain Hotel & Casino	Chandler	Maricopa	Arizona		Land-based	Owned by the Gila River Indian Community
Spirit Mountain Casino	Mohave Valley	Mohave	Arizona		Land-based	Owned by the Fort Mojave Indian Tribe; renovated in 2015
Talking Stick Resort	Scottsdale	Maricopa	Arizona		Land-based	Owned by the Salt River Pima–Maricopa Indian Community
Twin Arrows Navajo Casino Resort	Flagstaff	Coconino	Arizona		Land-based	Owned by the Navajo Nation
Vee Quiva Hotel & Casino	Laveen	Maricopa	Arizona		Land-based	Owned by the Gila River Indian Community; hotel opened in 2013
Wild Horse Pass Hotel & Casino	Chandler	Maricopa	Arizona		Land-based	Owned by the Gila River Indian Community; hotel opened in 2009
Yavapai Casino	Prescott	Yavapai	Arizona		Land-based	Owned by the Yavapai-Prescott Tribe
Oaklawn Racing Casino Resort	Hot Springs	Garland	Arkansas		Racino	Thoroughbred race track
Saracen Casino Resort	Pine Bluff	Jefferson	Arkansas		Land-based	Owned by the Quapaw
Southland Casino	West Memphis	Crittenden	Arkansas		Land-based	Ended greyhound races in 2022
Agua Caliente Casino Palm Springs	Palm Springs	Riverside	California		Native American	Owned by the Agua Caliente Band of Cahuilla Indians
Agua Caliente Casino Rancho Mirage	Rancho Mirage	Riverside	California		Native American	Owned by the Agua Caliente Band of Cahuilla Indians
Agua Caliente Casino Cathedral City	Cathedral City	Riverside	California		Native American	Owned by the Agua Caliente Band of Cahuilla Indians
Augustine Casino	Rancho Mirage	Riverside	California		Native American	Owned by the Augustine Band of Cahuilla Indians
Barona Casino	Lakeside	San Diego	California		Native American	Owned by the Barona Group of Capitan Grande Band of Mission Indians
Bear River Casino	Loleta	Humboldt	California		Native American	Owned by the Bear River Band of the Rohnerville Rancheria
Black Oak Casino	Tuolumne	Tuolumne	California		Native American	Owned by the Tuolumne Band of Me-Wuk Indians
Blue Lake Casino	Blue Lake	Humboldt	California		Native American	Owned by the Blue Lake Rancheria
Cache Creek Casino Resort	Brooks	Yolo	California		Native American	Owned by the Yocha Dehe Wintun Nation
Cahuilla Casino	Anza	Riverside	California		Native American	Owned by the Cahuilla Band of Indians
Casino Pauma	Pauma Valley	San Diego	California		Native American	Owned by Pauma Band of Luiseno Mission Indians
Cher-Ae Heights Bingo and Casino	Trinidad	Humboldt	California		Native American	Owned by the Cher-Ae Heights Indian Community of the Trinidad Rancheria
Chicken Ranch Bingo and Casino	Jamestown	Tuolumne	California		Native American	Owned by the Chicken Ranch Rancheria of Me-Wuk Indians of California
Chukchansi Gold Resort & Casino	Coarsegold	Madera	California		Native American	Owned by the Picayune Rancheria of Chukchansi Indians
Chumash Casino Resort	Santa Ynez	Santa Barbara	California		Native American	Owned by the Santa Ynez Band of Chumash Mission Indians
Colusa Casino Resort	Colusa	Colusa	California		Native American	Owned by the Colusa Indian Community
Coyote Valley Casino	Redwood Valley	Mendocino	California		Native American	Owned by the Coyote Valley Band of Pomo Indians – formerly known as Shodakai Casino
Desert Rose Casino	Alturas	Modoc	California		Native American	Owned by the Alturas Indian Rancheria
Diamond Mountain Casino	Susanville	Lassen	California		Native American	Owned by the Susanville Indian Rancheria
Eagle Mountain Casino	Porterville	Tulare	California		Native American	Owned by the Tule River Indian Tribe of the Tule River Reservation
Elk Valley Casino	Crescent City	Del Norte	California		Native American	Owned by the Elk Valley Rancheria
Fantasy Springs Resort and Casino	Indio	Riverside	California		Native American	Owned by the Cabazon Band of Cahuilla Indians
Feather Falls Casino	Oroville	Butte	California		Native American	Owned by the Mooretown Rancheria of Maidu Indians
Gold Country Casino and Hotel	Oroville	Butte	California		Native American	Owned by the Berry Creek Rancheria of Maidu Indians of California
Golden Acorn Casino	Campo	San Diego	California		Native American	Owned by the Campo Kumeyaay Nation
Graton Resort & Casino	Rohnert Park	Sonoma	California		Native American	Owned by the Federated Indians of Graton Rancheria
Hard Rock Hotel & Casino Sacramento at Fire Mountain	Wheatland	Yuba	California		Native American	Owned by the Estom Yumeka Maidu Tribe of the Enterprise Rancheria
Harrah's Northern California	Ione	Amador	California		Native American	Owned by the Buena Vista Rancheria of Me-Wuk Indians of California
Harrah's Resort Southern California	Valley Center	San Diego	California		Native American	Owned by the Rincon Band of Luiseño Indians
Havasu Landing Resort and Casino	Havasu Lake	San Bernardino	California		Native American	Owned by the Chemehuevi Indian Tribe of the Chemehuevi Reservation
Jackson Rancheria Casino	Jackson	Amador	California		Native American	Owned by the Jackson Band of Miwuk Indians
Jamul Casino	Jamul	San Diego	California		Native American	Owned by the Jamul Indian Village
Konocti Vista Casino and Bingo	Finley	Lake	California		Native American	Owned by the Big Valley Band of Pomo Indians of the Big Valley Rancheria
La Jolla Slot Arcade	Pauma Valley	San Diego	California		Native American	Defunct – formerly owned by the La Jolla Band of Luiseño Indians; closed in August 2004
La Posta Casino	Boulevard	San Diego	California		Native American	Defunct – formerly owned by the La Posta Band of Diegueño Mission Indians
Lucky 7 Casino	Smith River	Del Norte	California		Native American	Owned by the Tolowa Dee-niʼ Nation
Lucky Bear Casino	Hoopa	Humboldt	California		Native American	Owned by the Hoopa Valley Tribe
Mono Wind Casino	Auberry	Fresno	California		Native American	Owned by the Big Sandy Rancheria of Western Mono Indians
Morongo Casino, Resort & Spa	Cabazon	Riverside	California		Native American	Owned by the Morongo Band of Mission Indians
Pala Casino Resort and Spa	Pala	San Diego	California		Native American	Owned by the Pala Band of Mission Indians
Pechanga Resort and Casino	Temecula	Riverside	California		Native American	Owned by the Pechanga Band of Indians
Pit River Casino	Burney	Shasta	California		Native American	Owned by the Pit River Tribe
Quechan Resort Casino	Winterhaven	Imperial	California		Native American	Owned by the Quechan Tribe of the Fort Yuma Indian Reservation
Rain Rock Casino	Yreka	Siskiyou	California		Native American	Owned by the Karuk Tribe
Red Earth Casino	Salton City	Imperial	California		Native American	Owned by the Torres Martinez Desert Cahuilla Indians
Red Fox Casino	Laytonville	Mendocino	California		Native American	Owned by the Cahto Indian Tribe of the Laytonville Rancheria
Redhawk Casino	Shingle Springs	El Dorado	California		Native American	Owned by the Shingle Springs Band of Miwok Indians
River Rock Casino	Geyserville	Sonoma	California		Native American	Owned by the Dry Creek Rancheria Band of Pomo Indians
Robinson Rancheria Resort and Casino	Nice	Lake	California		Native American	Owned by the Robinson Rancheria of Pomo Indians of California
Rolling Hills Casino	Corning	Tehama	California		Native American	Owned by the Paskenta Band of Nomlaki Indians
San Pablo Lytton Casino	San Pablo	Contra Costa	California		Native American	Owned by the Lytton Band of Pomo Indians
Santa Ysabel Resort and Casino	Santa Ysabel	San Diego	California		Native American	Defunct – formerly owned by the Iipay Nation of Santa Ysabel
Sherwood Valley Rancheria Casino	Willits	Mendocino	California		Native American	Owned by the Sherwood Valley Rancheria of Pomo Indians of California – formerly known as Black Bart Casino
Sho-Ka-Wah Casino	Hopland	Mendocino	California		Native American	Defunct – formerly owned by the Hopland Band of Pomo Indians of the Hopland Rancheria
Sky River Casino	Elk Grove	Sacramento	California		Native American	Owned by the Wilton Rancheria
Soboba Casino Resort	San Jacinto	Riverside	California		Native American	Owned by the Soboba Band of Luiseño Indians
Spotlight 29 Casino	Coachella	Riverside	California		Native American	Owned by the Twenty-Nine Palms Band of Mission Indians of California
Sycuan Resort & Casino	El Cajon	San Diego	California		Native American	Owned by the Sycuan Band of the Kumeyaay Nation
Table Mountain Casino	Friant	Fresno	California		Native American	Owned by the Table Mountain Rancheria
Tachi Palace Hotel and Casino	Lemoore	Kings	California		Native American	Owned by the Santa Rosa Indian Community of the Santa Rosa Rancheria
Thunder Valley Casino Resort	Lincoln	Placer	California		Native American	Owned by the United Auburn Indian Community
Tortoise Rock Casino	Twentynine Palms	San Bernardino	California		Native American	Owned by the Twenty-Nine Palms Band of Mission Indians of California
Twin Pine Casino	Middletown	Lake	California		Native American	Owned by the Middletown Rancheria of Pomo Indians of California
Valley View Casino	Valley Center	San Diego	California		Native American	Owned by the San Pasqual Band of Mission Indians
Viejas Casino	Alpine	San Diego	California		Native American	Owned by the Viejas Band of Kumeyaay Indians
Wanaaha Casino	Bishop	Inyo	California		Native American	Owned by the Bishop Paiute Tribe – formerly known as Paiute Palace Casino
Win-River Casino	Redding	Shasta	California		Native American	Owned by the Redding Rancheria
Yaamava' Resort & Casino	Highland	San Bernardino	California		Native American	Owned by the Yuhaaviatam of San Manuel Nation
Ameristar Black Hawk	Black Hawk	Gilpin	Colorado		Land-based	State licensed casino
Bally's Black Hawk East	Black Hawk	Gilpin	Colorado		Land-based	State licensed casino; formerly Golden Gates Casino
Bally's Black Hawk North ()	Black Hawk	Gilpin	Colorado		Land-based	State licensed casino; formerly Mardi Gras Casino
Bally's Black Hawk West	Black Hawk	Gilpin	Colorado		Land-based	State licensed casino; formerly Golden Gulch Casino
Brass Ass Casino	Cripple Creek	Teller	Colorado		Land-based	State licensed casino
Bronco Billy's Casino	Cripple Creek	Teller	Colorado		Land-based	State licensed casino
Bull Durham Saloon and Casino	Black Hawk	Gilpin	Colorado		Land-based	State licensed casino
Century Casino & Hotel Central City	Central City	Gilpin	Colorado		Land-based	State licensed casino
Century Casino Cripple Creek	Cripple Creek	Teller	Colorado		Land-based	State licensed casino
Colorado Grande Casino	Cripple Creek	Teller	Colorado		Land-based	State licensed casino
Dostal Alley Brewpub & Casino	Central City	Gilpin	Colorado		Land-based	State licensed casino
Double Eagle Hotel & Casino	Cripple Creek	Teller	Colorado		Land-based	State licensed casino
Dragon Tiger Casino	Central City	Gilpin	Colorado		Land-based	State licensed casino
Easy Street Casino	Central City	Gilpin	Colorado		Land-based	State licensed casino
Famous Bonanza	Central City	Gilpin	Colorado		Land-based	State licensed casino
Gilpin Casino	Black Hawk	Gilpin	Colorado		Land-based	State licensed casino
Golden Nugget Cripple Creek	Cripple Creek	Teller	Colorado		Land-based	State licensed casino; formerly Wildwood Hotel & Casino
Grand Z Casino Hotel	Central City	Gilpin	Colorado		Land-based	State licensed casino
Horseshoe Black Hawk	Black Hawk	Gilpin	Colorado		Land-based	State licensed casino; formerly Isle of Capri
Johnny Nolon's Casino	Cripple Creek	Teller	Colorado		Land-based	State licensed casino
Lady Luck Hotel & Casino	Black Hawk	Gilpin	Colorado		Land-based	State licensed casino; formerly Colorado Central Station Casino
Lodge Casino	Black Hawk	Gilpin	Colorado		Land-based	State licensed casino
McGills Hotel & Casino	Cripple Creek	Teller	Colorado		Land-based	State licensed casino
Midnight Rose Hotel & Casino	Cripple Creek	Teller	Colorado		Land-based	State licensed casino
Monarch Casino Resort Spa	Black Hawk	Gilpin	Colorado		Land-based	State licensed casino; formerly Riviera Casino
Red Dolly Casino	Black Hawk	Gilpin	Colorado		Land-based	State licensed casino
Saratoga Casino	Black Hawk	Gilpin	Colorado		Land-based	State licensed casino; formerly Fitzgerald's Casino
Sasquatch Casino	Black Hawk	Gilpin	Colorado		Land-based	State licensed casino
Sky Ute Casino Resort	Ignacio	La Plata	Colorado		Native American	Owned by the Southern Ute Indian Tribe
Ute Mountain Casino Hotel	Towaoc	Montezuma	Colorado		Native American	Owned by the Ute Mountain Ute Tribe
Wild Card Casino & Saloon	Black Hawk	Gilpin	Colorado		Land-based	State licensed casino; first casino in Colorado
Z Casino	Black Hawk	Gilpin	Colorado		Land-based	State licensed casino; formerly Bullwhacker's Casino
Foxwoods Resort Casino	Mashantucket	New London	Connecticut		Native American	Owned by the Mashantucket Pequot Tribe
Mohegan Sun	Montville	New London	Connecticut		Native American	Owned by the Mohegan Tribe
Bally's Dover Casino Resort	Dover	Kent	Delaware		Racino	
Casino at Delaware Park	Newark	New Castle	Delaware		Racino	
Harrington Raceway & Casino	Harrington	Kent	Delaware		Racino	
Big Easy Casino	Hallandale Beach	Broward	Florida		Racino	
Calder Casino & Race Course	Miami Gardens	Miami-Dade	Florida		Racino	
Casino Miami Jai-Alai	Miami	Miami-Dade	Florida		Racino	
Creek Entertainment Gretna	Gretna	Gadsden	Florida		Racino	
Dania Jai-Alai	Dania Beach	Broward	Florida		Racino	
Daytona Beach Racing and Card Club	Daytona Beach	Volusia	Florida		Racino	
Derby Lane	St. Petersburg	Pinellas	Florida		Racino	
Ebro Greyhound Track	Ebro	Washington	Florida		Racino	
Flagler Dog Track and Magic City Casino	Miami	Miami-Dade	Florida		Racino	
Fort Pierce Jai-Alai & Poker	Fort Pierce	St. Lucie County	Florida		Racino	
Gulfstream Park Racing and Casino	Hallandale Beach	Broward	Florida		Racino	
Harrah's Pompano Beach	Pompano Beach	Broward	Florida		Racino	
Hialeah Park Race Track	Hialeah	Miami-Dade	Florida		Racino	
Best Bet Jacksonville	Jacksonville	Duval	Florida		Racino	
Jefferson County Kennel Club	Monticello	Jefferson	Florida		Racino	Closed in 2014
Magic City Casino	Miami	Miami-Dade	Florida		Racino	
Melbourne Greyhound Park	Melbourne	Brevard	Florida		Racino	
Miccosukee Resort and Gaming Center	Miami	Miami-Dade	Florida		Native American	Owned by the Miccosukee Tribe of Indians
Naples/Fort Myers Greyhound Track	Bonita Springs	Lee	Florida		Racino	
Ocala Poker & Jai-Alai (later Ocala Gainesville Poker)	Orange Lake	Marion	Florida		Racino	Closed in October 2023
Best Bet Orange Park	Orange Park	Clay	Florida		Racino	
Orange City Racing and Card Club	Orange City	Volusia	Florida		Racino	
Oxford Downs	Summerfield	Marion	Florida		Racino	
Palm Beach Kennel Club	West Palm Beach	Palm Beach	Florida		Racino	
Pensacola Greyhound Track	Pensacola	Escambia	Florida		Racino	
Sarasota Kennel Club	Sarasota	Sarasota	Florida		Racino	
Seminole Casino Big Cypress	Clewiston	Hendry	Florida		Native American	Defunct – formally owned by the Seminole Tribe of Florida
Seminole Casino Brighton	Okeechobee	Okeechobee	Florida		Native American	Owned by the Seminole Tribe of Florida
Seminole Casino Hotel Immokalee	Immokalee	Collier	Florida		Native American	Owned by the Seminole Tribe of Florida
Seminole Casino Coconut Creek	Coconut Creek	Broward	Florida		Native American	Owned by the Seminole Tribe of Florida
Seminole Hard Rock Hotel and Casino Hollywood	Hollywood	Broward	Florida		Native American	Owned by the Seminole Tribe of Florida
Seminole Hard Rock Hotel and Casino Tampa	Tampa	Hillsborough	Florida		Native American	Owned by the Seminole Tribe of Florida
Seminole Classic Casino	Hollywood	Broward	Florida		Native American	Owned by the Seminole Tribe of Florida
Tampa Bay Downs	Tampa	Hillsborough	Florida		Racino	
Tampa Greyhound Track	Tampa	Hillsborough	Florida		Racino	
Best Bet St. Augustine	St. Augustine	Flagler	Florida		Racino	
Coeur d'Alene Casino	Worley	Kootenai	Idaho		Native American	Coeur d'Alene Tribe
Clearwater Casino	Lewiston	Nez Perce	Idaho		Native American	Nez Perce Tribe
Fort Hall Casino	Fort Hall	Fort Hall	Idaho		Native American	Shoshone-Bannock Tribes
It'se Ye Ye Casino	Kamiah	Lewis	Idaho		Native American	Nez Perce Tribe
Kootenai River Inn and Casino	Bonners Ferry	Boundary	Idaho		Native American	Kootenai Tribe of Idaho
American Place	Waukegan	Lake	Illinois			Temporary casino open; permanent casino planned to open in 2026.
Argosy Casino Alton	Alton	Madison	Illinois			
Bally's Chicago	Chicago	Cook	Illinois			Under development, planned to open in 2026.
Bally's Quad Cities	Rock Island	Rock Island	Illinois			
DraftKings at Casino Queen	East St. Louis	St. Clair	Illinois			
FanDuel Sportsbook and Racing	Collinsville	Madison	Illinois		Racino	
Golden Nugget Danville	Danville	Vermilion	Illinois			
Grand Victoria Casino Elgin	Elgin	Kane	Illinois			
Hard Rock Casino Rockford	Rockford	Winnebago	Illinois			
Harrah's Joliet	Joliet	Will	Illinois			
Harrah's Metropolis	Metropolis	Massac	Illinois			
Hollywood Casino Aurora	Aurora	Kane	Illinois			
Hollywood Casino Joliet	Joliet	Will	Illinois			
Par-A-Dice Casino	East Peoria	Tazewell	Illinois			
Rivers Casino	Des Plaines	Cook	Illinois			
Walker's Bluff Casino Resort	Carterville	Williamson	Illinois			
Wind Creek Chicago Southland	East Hazel Crest	Cook	Illinois			Opened in November of 2024.
Ameristar Casino East Chicago	East Chicago	Lake	Indiana	Lake Michigan	Riverboat	Formerly Resorts, Harrahs, and Showboat Mardi Gras
Bally's Evansville	Evansville	Vanderburgh	Indiana	Ohio River	Land-based	Formerly Casino Aztar and Tropicana
Belterra Casino Resort & Spa	Florence	Switzerland	Indiana	Ohio River	Riverboat	
Blue Chip Casino	Michigan City	LaPorte	Indiana	Lake Michigan	Riverboat	
Caesars Southern Indiana	Elizabeth	Harrison	Indiana	Ohio River	Land-based	Formerly Horseshoe
Four Winds South Bend	South Bend	St. Joseph	Indiana		Native American	
Hard Rock Casino Northern Indiana	Gary	Lake	Indiana	Lake Michigan	Land-based	
French Lick Resort Casino	French Lick	Orange	Indiana		Land-based	
Hollywood Casino Lawrenceburg	Lawrenceburg	Dearborn	Indiana	Ohio River	Riverboat	Formerly Argosy Casino
Hoosier Park	Anderson	Madison	Indiana		Racino	
Horseshoe Hammond	Hammond	Lake	Indiana	Lake Michigan	Riverboat	Formerly Empress Casino
Horseshoe Indianapolis	Shelbyville	Shelby	Indiana		Racino	Formerly Indiana Live! and Indiana Grand
Rising Star Casino Resort	Rising Sun	Ohio	Indiana	Ohio River	Riverboat	Formerly Grand Victoria Casino & Resort
Terre Haute Casino Resort	Terre Haute	Vigo	Indiana	Ohio River	Land-based	Opened in 2024
Majestic Star Casino	Gary	Lake	Indiana	Lake Michigan	Riverboat	Closed in 2021.
Majestic Star II	Gary	Lake	Indiana	Lake Michigan	Riverboat	Previously Trump Casino. Closed in 2021.
Ameristar Casino Council Bluffs	Council Bluffs	Pottawattamie	Iowa		Riverboat	
Argosy Casino Sioux City	Sioux City	Woodbury	Iowa		Riverboat	Closed July 30, 2014
Blackbird Bend Casino	Onawa	Monona	Iowa		Native American	Owned by the Omaha Tribe of Nebraska
Casino Queen Marquette	Marquette	Clayton	Iowa		Riverboat	
Catfish Bend Casino	Burlington	Des Moines	Iowa		Land-based	
Diamond Jo Dubuque	Dubuque	Dubuque	Iowa		Land-based	
Diamond Jo Worth	Northwood	Worth	Iowa		Land-based	
Grand Falls Casino	Larchwood	Lyon	Iowa		Land-based	
Hard Rock Sioux City	Sioux City	Woodbury	Iowa		Land-based	
Harrah's Council Bluffs	Council Bluffs	Pottawattamie	Iowa		Land-based	
Horseshoe Council Bluffs	Council Bluffs	Pottawattamie	Iowa		Land-based	
Isle Casino Bettendorf	Bettendorf	Scott	Iowa		Land-based	
Isle Casino Waterloo	Waterloo	Black Hawk	Iowa		Land-based	
Lakeside Hotel & Casino	Osceola	Clarke	Iowa		Riverboat	
Meskwaki Casino	Tama	Tama	Iowa		Native American	Owned by the Sac and Fox Tribe of the Mississippi in Iowa
Prairie Flower Casino	Carter Lake	Pottawattamie	Iowa		Native American	Owned by the Ponca Tribe of Nebraska
Prairie Meadows	Altoona	Polk	Iowa		Racino	
Q Casino	Dubuque	Dubuque	Iowa		Land-based	
Rhythm City Casino Resort	Davenport	Scott	Iowa		Land-based	
Riverside Casino & Golf Resort	Riverside	Washington	Iowa		Land-based	
Wild Rose Casino and Resort	Clinton	Clinton	Iowa		Land-based	
Wild Rose Casino and Resort	Emmetsburg	Palo Alto	Iowa		Land-based	
Wild Rose Casino and Resort	Jefferson	Greene	Iowa		Land-based	
WinnaVegas Casino Resort	Sloan	Woodbury	Iowa		Native American	Owned by the Winnebago Tribe of Nebraska
7th Street Casino	Kansas City	Wyandotte	Kansas		Native American	Owned by the Wyandotte Nation
Boot Hill Casino	Dodge City	Ford	Kansas		Land-based	Opened December 2009
Casino White Cloud	White Cloud	Doniphan	Kansas		Native American	Owned by the Iowa Tribe of Kansas and Nebraska
CrossWinds Casino	Park City	Sedgwick	Kansas		Native American	Owned by the Wyandotte Nation
Golden Eagle Casino	Horton	Brown	Kansas		Native American	Owned by the Kickapoo Tribe in Kansas
Hollywood Casino at Kansas Speedway	Kansas City	Wyandotte	Kansas		Land-based	Opened February 2012
Kansas Crossing Casino and Hotel	Pittsburg	Crawford	Kansas		Land-based	Opened March 2017
Kansas Star Casino	Mulvane	Sumner	Kansas		Land-based	Opened on Dec. 26, 2011
Prairie Band Casino & Resort	Mayetta	Jackson	Kansas		Native American	Owned by the Prairie Band Potawatomi Nation
Sac and Fox Casino	Powhattan	Brown	Kansas		Native American	Owned by the Sac and Fox Nation of Missouri in Kansas and Nebraska
Amelia Belle	Amelia	St. Mary	Louisiana		Riverboat	Formerly Bally's, Belle of Orleans.
Bally's Baton Rouge	Baton Rouge	East Baton Rouge	Louisiana		Riverboat	Formerly Argosy Casino, Belle of Baton Rouge
Bally's Shreveport	Shreveport	Caddo	Louisiana		Riverboat	Formerly Hollywood Casino, Eldorado Casino
Boomtown Bossier City	Bossier City	Bossier	Louisiana		Riverboat	Formerly Casino Magic.
Boomtown New Orleans	Harvey	Jefferson	Louisiana		Riverboat	
Coushatta Casino Resort	Kinder	Allen	Louisiana		Native American	Formerly Grand Casino Coushatta.
Cypress Bayou Casino	Charenton	St. Mary	Louisiana		Native American	
Delta Downs	Vinton	Calcasieu	Louisiana		Racino	
Diamond Jacks Casino Bossier City	Bossier City	Bossier	Louisiana		Riverboat	Formerly Isle of Capri. Closed; Re-opening 2024.
Evangeline Downs	Opelousas	St. Landry	Louisiana		Racino	
Fair Grounds Race Course	New Orleans	Orleans	Louisiana		Racino	
Flamingo Casino New Orleans	New Orleans	Orleans	Louisiana		Riverboat	Closed 1997.
Golden Nugget Lake Charles	Lake Charles	Calcasieu	Louisiana		Riverboat	
Harrah's Lake Charles	Lake Charles	Calcasieu	Louisiana		Riverboat	Closed 2005. Formerly Players Island.
Caesars New Orleans	New Orleans	Orleans	Louisiana		Land-based	
Horseshoe Bossier City	Bossier City	Bossier	Louisiana		Riverboat	
Horseshoe Lake Charles	Westlake	Calcasieu	Louisiana		Riverboat	
Jena Choctaw Pines Casino	Dry Prong	Grant	Louisiana		Native American	
L'Auberge Casino Resort Lake Charles	Lake Charles	Calcasieu	Louisiana		Riverboat	
L'Auberge Casino Baton Rouge	Baton Rouge	East Baton Rouge	Louisiana		Riverboat	
Louisiana Downs	Bossier City	Bossier	Louisiana		Racino	
Margaritaville Resort Casino	Bossier City	Bossier	Louisiana		Riverboat	
Paragon Casino Resort	Marksville	Avoyelles	Louisiana		Native American	Formerly Grand Casino Avoyelles.
The Queen Baton Rouge	Baton Rouge	East Baton Rouge	Louisiana		Riverboat	Formerly Hollywood Casino Baton Rouge.
River City Casino	New Orleans	Orleans	Louisiana		Riverboat	Closed 1995.
Sam's Town Shreveport	Shreveport	Caddo	Louisiana		Riverboat	Formerly Harrah's.
Showboat Star Casino	New Orleans	Orleans	Louisiana		Riverboat	Closed 1995.
Treasure Chest Casino	Kenner	Jefferson	Louisiana		Riverboat	
Hollywood Casino Hotel & Raceway Bangor	Bangor	Penobscot	Maine		Racino	
Oxford Casino	Oxford	Oxford	Maine		Land-based	
Hollywood Casino Perryville	Perryville	Cecil	Maryland		Land-based	
Horseshoe Casino Baltimore	Baltimore	Baltimore	Maryland		Land-based	
Live! Casino & Hotel	Hanover	Anne Arundel	Maryland		Land-based	
MGM National Harbor	Oxon Hill	Prince George's	Maryland		Land-based	
Ocean Downs	Berlin	Worcester	Maryland		Racino	
Rocky Gap Casino Resort	Flintstone	Allegany	Maryland		Land-based	
MGM Springfield	Springfield	Hampden	Massachusetts		Land-based	State licensed casino
Plainridge Park Casino	Plainville	Norfolk	Massachusetts		Racino	Harness race track; no table games
Encore Boston Harbor	Everett	Middlesex	Massachusetts		Land-based	State licensed casino
Bay Mills Resort & Casino	Brimley	Chippewa	Michigan		Native American	Owned by the Bay Mills Indian Community
FireKeepers Casino Hotel	Battle Creek	Calhoun	Michigan		Native American	Owned by the Nottawaseppi Huron Band of Potawatomi
Four Winds New Buffalo	New Buffalo	Berrien	Michigan		Native American	Owned by the Pokagon Band of Potawatomi Indians
Four Winds Hartford	Hartford	Van Buren	Michigan		Native American	Owned by the Pokagon Band of Potawatomi Indians
Four Winds Dowagiac	Dowagiac	Cass	Michigan		Native American	Owned by the Pokagon Band of Potawatomi Indians
Gun Lake Casino	Wayland	Allegan	Michigan		Native American	Owned by the Match-e-be-nash-she-wish Band of Pottawatomi Indians of Michigan
Hollywood Casino at Greektown	Detroit	Wayne	Michigan		Land-based	
Island Resort & Casino	Bark River	Menominee	Michigan		Native American	Owned by the Hannahville Indian Community
Kewadin Casino - Christmas	Christmas	Alger	Michigan		Native American	Owned by the Sault Tribe of Chippewa Indians
Kewadin Casino - Hessel	Hessel	Mackinac	Michigan		Native American	Owned by the Sault Tribe of Chippewa Indians
Kewadin Casino - Manistique	Manistique	Schoolcraft	Michigan		Native American	Owned by the Sault Tribe of Chippewa Indians
Kewadin Casino, Hotel and Convention Center	Sault Sainte Marie	Chippewa	Michigan		Native American	Owned by the Sault Tribe of Chippewa Indians
Kewadin Shores Casino - St. Ignace	St Ignace	Mackinac	Michigan		Native American	Owned by the Sault Tribe of Chippewa Indians
Kings Club Casino	Brimley	Chippewa	Michigan		Native American	Owned by the Bay Mills Indian Community
Leelanau Sands Casino	Suttons Bay	Leelanau	Michigan		Native American	Owned by the Grand Traverse Band of Ottawa and Chippewa Indians
Little River Casino and Resort	Manistee	Manistee	Michigan		Native American	Owned by the Little River Band of Ottawa Indians
MGM Grand Detroit	Detroit	Wayne	Michigan		Land-based	
MotorCity Casino Hotel	Detroit	Wayne	Michigan		Land-based	
Northern Waters Casino Resort	Watersmeet	Gogebic	Michigan		Native American	Owned by the Lac Vieux Desert Band of Lake Superior Chippewa
Odawa Casino Mackinaw	Mackinaw City	Cheboygan	Michigan		Native American	Owned by the Little Traverse Bay Bands of Odawa Indians
Odawa Casino Resort	Petoskey	Emmet	Michigan		Native American	Owned by the Little Traverse Bay Bands of Odawa Indians
Ojibwa Casino - Marquette	Marquette	Marquette	Michigan		Native American	Owned by the Keweenaw Bay Indian Community
Ojibwa Casino Resort - Baraga	Baraga	Baraga	Michigan		Native American	Owned by the Keweenaw Bay Indian Community
Saganing Eagles Landing Casino	Standish	Arenac	Michigan		Native American	Owned by the Saginaw Chippewa Tribal Nation
Soaring Eagle Casino & Resort	Mt. Pleasant	Isabella	Michigan		Native American	Owned by the Saginaw Chippewa Tribal Nation
Turtle Creek Casino and Hotel	Williamsburg	Grand Traverse	Michigan		Native American	Owned by the Grand Traverse Band of Ottawa and Chippewa Indians
Black Bear Casino Resort	Carlton	Carlton	Minnesota		Native American	Owned by the Fond du Lac Band of Lake Superior Chippewa
Canterbury Park	Shakopee	Scott	Minnesota		Racino	Thoroughbred race track
Fond-du-Luth Casino	Duluth	St. Louis	Minnesota		Native American	Owned by the Fond du Lac Band of Lake Superior Chippewa
Fortune Bay Resort Casino	Tower	St. Louis	Minnesota		Native American	Owned by the Bois Forte Band of Chippewa
Grand Casino Hinckley	Hinckley	Pine	Minnesota		Native American	Owned by the Mille Lacs Band of Ojibwe
Grand Casino Mille Lacs	Onamia	Mille Lacs	Minnesota		Native American	Owned by the Mille Lacs Band of Ojibwe
Grand Portage Lodge & Casino	Grand Portage	Cook	Minnesota		Native American	Owned by the Grand Portage Band of Lake Superior Chippewa
Jackpot Junction Casino Hotel	Morton	Redwood	Minnesota		Native American	Owned by the Lower Sioux Indian Community
Little Six Casino	Prior Lake	Scott	Minnesota		Native American	Owned by the Shakopee Mdewakanton Sioux Community
Mystic Lake Casino Hotel	Prior Lake	Scott	Minnesota		Native American	Owned by the Shakopee Mdewakanton Sioux Community
Northern Lights Casino & Hotel	Walker	Cass	Minnesota		Native American	Owned by the Leech Lake Band of Ojibwe
Cedar Lakes Casino	Cass Lake	Cass	Minnesota		Native American	Owned by the Leech Lake Band of Ojibwe
Prairie's Edge Casino Resort	Granite Falls	Yellow Medicine	Minnesota		Native American	Owned by the Upper Sioux Community
Running Aces Casino & Racetrack	Columbus	Anoka	Minnesota		Racino	Thoroughbred race track
Seven Clans Casino Red Lake	Red Lake	Beltrami	Minnesota		Native American	Owned by the Red Lake Band of Chippewa
Seven Clans Casino Thief River Falls	Thief River Falls	Pennington	Minnesota		Native American	Owned by the Red Lake Band of Chippewa
Seven Clans Casino Warroad	Warroad	Roseau	Minnesota		Native American	Owned by the Red Lake Band of Chippewa
Shooting Star Casino	Mahnomen	Mahnomen	Minnesota		Native American	Owned by the White Earth Nation
Treasure Island Resort & Casino	Red Wing	Goodhue	Minnesota		Native American	Owned by the Prairie Island Indian Community
White Oak Casino	Deer River	Itasca	Minnesota		Native American	Owned by the Leech Lake Band of Ojibwe
Ameristar Casino Vicksburg	Vicksburg	Warren	Mississippi	Lower River Region		
Bally's Vicksburg	Vicksburg	Warren	Mississippi	Lower River Region		Formerly Rainbow Casino, Lady Luck Casino Vicksburg, and Casino Vicksburg
Bayou Caddy's Jubilee Casino	Greenville	Washington	Mississippi	Lower River Region		Closed 2012, merged into Trop Casino Greenville
Beau Rivage	Biloxi	Harrison	Mississippi	Gulf Coast		
Biloxi Boardwalk Resort	Biloxi	Harrison	Mississippi	Gulf Coast		Postposed new 37-acres resort includes 500-room hotel, casino, sand beach pool, lazy river, waterslides, and a restaurant on a raised pier
Bok Homa Casino	Sandersville	Jones	Mississippi		Native American	
Boomtown Biloxi	Biloxi	Harrison	Mississippi	Gulf Coast		Postposed New Hotel on the same property
Casino Magic Biloxi	Biloxi	Harrison	Mississippi	Gulf Coast		Closed 2005
Copa Casino	Gulfport	Harrison	Mississippi	Gulf Coast		Closed 2005. Replaced by Island View Casino
1st Jackpot Casino Tunica	Tunica Resorts	Tunica	Mississippi	Upper River Region		Formerly Bally's; hotel now closed, casino still in operation
Eastside Cannery Biloxi	Biloxi	Harrison	Mississippi	Gulf Coast		Planned hotel casino located on North corner of Back Bay & Holley Intersection, 300 room tower located on the bay, new location planning after demolish in Vegas
Fitz Tunica Casino & Hotel	Tunica Resorts	Tunica	Mississippi	Upper River Region		
Foxwoods Resort Casino	Biloxi	Harrison	Mississippi	Gulf Coast		Planned opening is unknown, located northwest of Back Bay & Oak intersection
Gold Strike Tunica	Tunica Resorts	Tunica	Mississippi	Upper River Region		
Golden Moon Casino	Choctaw	Neshoba	Mississippi		Native American	Part of the Pearl River Resort
Golden Nugget Biloxi	Biloxi	Harrison	Mississippi	Gulf Coast		
Grand Station Casino	Vicksburg	Warren	Mississippi	Lower River Region		Closed 2012
Hard Rock Hotel & Casino Biloxi	Biloxi	Harrison	Mississippi	Gulf Coast		
Harlow's Casino	Greenville	Washington	Mississippi	Lower River Region		
Harrah's Casino Tunica	Tunica Resorts	Tunica	Mississippi	Upper River Region		Formerly Grand Casino Tunica; closed 2014
Harrah's Gulf Coast	Biloxi	Harrison	Mississippi	Gulf Coast		
Hollywood Casino Gulf Coast	Bay St. Louis	Hancock	Mississippi	Gulf Coast		Formerly Casino Magic
Hollywood Casino Tunica	Tunica Resorts	Tunica	Mississippi	Upper River Region		
Horseshoe Casino Tunica	Tunica Resorts	Tunica	Mississippi	Upper River Region		
IP Casino Resort Spa	Biloxi	Harrison	Mississippi	Gulf Coast		
Island View Casino	Gulfport	Harrison	Mississippi	Gulf Coast		
Isle of Capri Casino Hotel Lula	Lula	Coahoma	Mississippi	Upper River Region		
Isle of Capri Casino Hotel Natchez	Natchez	Adams	Mississippi	Lower River Region		Closed 2015
Magnolia Bluffs Casino	Natchez	Adams	Mississippi	Lower River Region		
Margaritaville Casino and Restaurant	Biloxi	Harrison	Mississippi	Gulf Coast		Closed 2014
Palace Casino Biloxi	Biloxi	Harrison	Mississippi	Gulf Coast		
President Casino Broadwater Resort	Biloxi	Harrison	Mississippi	Gulf Coast		Closed 2005
Resorts Casino Tunica	Tunica Resorts	Tunica	Mississippi	Upper River Region		Closed 2019
Riverwalk Casino and Hotel	Vicksburg	Warren	Mississippi	Lower River Region		
Sam's Town Hotel and Gambling Hall, Tunica	Tunica Resorts	Tunica	Mississippi	Upper River Region		Closed in November 2025
Scarlet Pearl Casino	D'Iberville	Harrison	Mississippi	Gulf Coast		
Silver Slipper Casino	Lakeshore	Hancock	Mississippi	Gulf Coast		
Silver Star Casino	Choctaw	Neshoba	Mississippi		Native American	Part of the Pearl River Resort
Rock and Brews casino	Biloxi	Harrison	Mississippi	Gulf Coast		Located on 5th St Biloxi, an KISS themed hotel casino, Initial plans for the 40,000 square foot casino include a 3,000 seat concert venue, a world tour food hall and a 300-room hotel.
RW Casino Resort	Biloxi	Harrison	Mississippi	Gulf Coast		Future Casino Resort located at the US 90 & Veterans Ave
Tivoli Resort & Casino	Biloxi	Harrison	Mississippi	Gulf Coast		Future Casino Resort rendering shows plans for Biloxi Capital’s proposed casino resort at the Tivoli site in East Biloxi. Among the amenities would be 1,300 hotel rooms, convention space and 2,000 slot machines. City of Biloxi
Treasure Bay Casino Biloxi	Biloxi	Harrison	Mississippi	Gulf Coast		
Tullis Gardens Biloxi	Biloxi	Harrison	Mississippi	Gulf Coast		Planned New Hotel & Casino
Trop Casino Greenville	Greenville	Washington	Mississippi	Lower River Region		Formerly Lighthouse Point Casino
Tunica Roadhouse Casino & Hotel	Tunica Resorts	Tunica	Mississippi	Upper River Region		Formerly Sheraton Casino and Hotel Tunica; casino floor closed 2019, hotel closed 2020
Wind Creek D'Iberville	D'Iberville	Harrison	Mississippi	Gulf Coast		Located on the West of I-110 Interstate, features 300+ rooms, casino floor, shopping & dining, and more
UMUSIC Broadwater Hotel	Biloxi	Harrison	Mississippi	Gulf Coast		Planned new live entertainment resort, Features: The resort is planned to include a luxury hotel, a large music venue, a casino, a water park, and retail space. Partnership: A joint venture between Universal Music Group, Dakia U-Ventures, and Pyramid Hotel Group. Brand: The project is part of the UMUSIC Hotels brand, which aims to integrate music-based experiences into the local culture. Universal Music Group
WaterView Casino & Hotel	Vicksburg	Warren	Mississippi	Lower River Region		Formerly Isle of Capri and DiamondJacks
Ameristar	St. Charles	St. Charles	Missouri			
Ameristar	Kansas City	Clay	Missouri			
Argosy Casino Riverside	Riverside	Platte	Missouri			Formerly Argosy V
Bally's Kansas City	Kansas City	Jackson	Missouri			Formerly Hilton Flamingo & Isle of Capri Kansas City & Casino KC
Century Casino Cape Girardeau	Cape Girardeau	Cape Girardeau	Missouri			Formerly Isle Casino Cape Girardeau
Century Casino Caruthersville	Caruthersville	Pemiscot	Missouri			Formerly Lady Luck Casino Caruthersville
Harrah's	North Kansas City	Clay	Missouri			
Hollywood Casino St. Louis	Maryland Heights	St. Louis	Missouri			Formerly Players Island Casino St. Louis
Horseshoe St. Louis	St. Louis		Missouri			Formerly Lumiere Place Casino
Isle of Capri	Boonville	Cooper	Missouri			
Mark Twain	La Grange	Lewis	Missouri			
River City Casino	St. Louis		Missouri			
President Casino Laclede's Landing	St. Louis		Missouri			Closed 2010
St. Jo Frontier Casino	St. Joseph	Buchanan	Missouri			
Aladdin	Paradise	Clark	Nevada	Las Vegas		Defunct; closed 1997. Demolished in 1998. Now the site of Planet Hollywood.
Aliante Casino and Hotel	North Las Vegas	Clark	Nevada	North Las Vegas		Previously Aliante Station
Aquarius	Laughlin	Clark	Nevada	Laughlin		Formerly known as Flamingo Hilton Laughlin and Flamingo Laughlin
Aria Resort and Casino	Paradise	Clark	Nevada	Las Vegas Strip		
Arizona Charlie's Boulder	Paradise	Clark	Nevada	Boulder Strip		Formerly the Sunrise (which never opened)
Arizona Charlie's Decatur	Paradise	Clark	Nevada	Balance of Clark County		
Atlantis	Reno	Washoe	Nevada	Reno		
Avi	Laughlin	Clark	Nevada	Laughlin		
Aztec Inn	Las Vegas	Clark	Nevada	Las Vegas Strip		
Baldini's Sports Casino	Sparks	Washoe	Nevada	Sparks		
Bally's Lake Tahoe	Stateline	Douglas	Nevada	South Lake Tahoe		Formerly known as Park Tahoe, Caesars Tahoe, and MontBleu
Barley's	Henderson	Clark	Nevada	Boulder Strip		
Barton's Club 93	Jackpot	Elko	Nevada	Balance of Elko County		
Bellagio	Paradise	Clark	Nevada	Las Vegas Strip		Formerly the Dunes
Bighorn Casino	North Las Vegas	Clark	Nevada	North Las Vegas		
Bill's Casino Lake Tahoe	Stateline	Douglas	Nevada	South Lake Tahoe		Formerly Barney's Casino and the Tahoe Plaza Casino; Defunct; closed January 4, 2010
Binion's Gambling Hall and Hotel	Las Vegas	Clark	Nevada	Las Vegas Downtown		Formerly Binion's Horseshoe
Boardwalk	Paradise	Clark	Nevada	Las Vegas Strip		Defunct; closed 9 January 2006. Demolished May 2006. Now the Waldorf Astoria Las Vegas.
Bodines Casino	Carson City		Nevada	Carson Valley Area		
Bonanza Casino	Fallon	Churchill	Nevada	Williams Ave		
Bonanza Casino	Reno	Washoe	Nevada	Reno		
Boomtown Reno	Verdi	Washoe	Nevada	Balance of Washoe County		
Boulder Station	Sunrise Manor	Clark	Nevada	Boulder Strip		
Bourbon Square Casino	Sparks	Washoe	Nevada	Sparks		Formerly Silver Club; defunct; closed February 2015. Demolished 2018. Now the site of Nugget Event Center.
Bourbon Street Hotel and Casino	Paradise	Clark	Nevada	Las Vegas Strip		Defunct; closed 18 October 2005. Demolished 14 February 2006. Now an employee parking lot for The Cromwell.
Buffalo Bill's	Primm	Clark	Nevada	Balance of Clark County		Planned to close in July 2026.
Buffalo Club Casino	Sparks	Washoe	Nevada	Sparks		
Cactus Jack's Senator Club	Carson City		Nevada	Carson Valley Area		
Cactus Pete's	Jackpot	Elko	Nevada	Balance of Elko County		
Caesars Palace	Paradise	Clark	Nevada	Las Vegas Strip		
California Club	Las Vegas	Clark	Nevada	Las Vegas Downtown		Defunct; closed 1973. Now part of Golden Nugget.
California Hotel and Casino	Las Vegas	Clark	Nevada	Las Vegas Downtown		
Cal Neva Lodge & Casino	Crystal Bay	Washoe	Nevada	South Lake Tahoe		Closed for renovations 2013, purchased out of bankruptcy 2018. Sold to Denver-based McWhinney in 2023 with plans to convert it to a luxury hotel.
Cannery Casino and Hotel	North Las Vegas	Clark	Nevada	North Las Vegas		
Carson Nugget	Carson City		Nevada	Carson Valley Area		
Carson Valley Inn	Minden	Douglas	Nevada	Carson Valley Area		
CasaBlanca	Mesquite	Clark	Nevada	Mesquite		Formerly Players Island
Casino Fandango	Carson City		Nevada	Carson Valley Area		Carson Gaming
Casino Monte Lago	Henderson	Clark	Nevada	Boulder Strip		Defunct; closed 2013
Casino Royale	Paradise	Clark	Nevada	Las Vegas Strip		
Casino West	Yerington	Lyon	Nevada	Balance of State		
Castaways	Las Vegas	Clark	Nevada	Las Vegas Strip		Defunct; closed 1987. Became the site of The Mirage (now Hard Rock Las Vegas).
Castaways Hotel and Casino	Las Vegas	Clark	Nevada	Boulder Strip		Formerly the Showboat; defunct; closed 29 January 2004. Demolished in 2006 for a new resort, Castaways Station, but construction never began. An apartment complex, storage facility and health district building now sit on much of the site and a Wildfire casino sits on the remainder.
Churchill Station	Fallon	Churchill	Nevada	Williams Ave		
Circa Resort & Casino	Las Vegas	Clark	Nevada	Las Vegas Downtown		
Circus Circus Las Vegas	Winchester	Clark	Nevada	Las Vegas Strip		
Circus Circus Reno	Reno	Washoe	Nevada	Reno		
Clarion Hotel and Casino	Paradise	Clark	Nevada	Las Vegas Strip		Defunct; closed 2014. Imploded in 2015. A non-gaming hotel is planned to be built on the site, but it remains undeveloped as of December 2022.
Club Cal Neva	Reno	Washoe	Nevada	Reno		
Colorado Belle Hotel & Casino	Laughlin	Clark	Nevada	Laughlin		Closed since 2020 due to the COVID-19 pandemic.
Colt Casino	Battle Mountain	Lander	Nevada	Balance of State		
Commercial Casino	Elko	Elko	Nevada	Balance of Elko County		Defunct; closed
Comstock Hotel & Casino	Reno	Washoe	Nevada	Reno		Defunct; became a residential hotel in 2006.
Cosmopolitan of Las Vegas	Paradise	Clark	Nevada	Las Vegas Strip		
Cotton Club	West Las Vegas	Clark	Nevada	Balance of Clark County		Defunct; closed 1957
C Punch Inn & Casino	Lovelock	Pershing	Nevada	Balance of State		
Crystal Bay Club Casino	Crystal Bay	Washoe	Nevada	South Lake Tahoe		
Delta Saloon & Casino	Virginia City	Storey	Nevada	Balance of State		All slot machines currently removed and in storage pending renewal of gambling license following transition to new owner.
Depot Casino	Fallon	Churchill	Nevada	Main St		
Desert Inn	Paradise	Clark	Nevada	Las Vegas Strip		Defunct; closed 2000. Demolished by 2004. Now the site of the Wynn Las Vegas and Encore Las Vegas.
Diamond Casino	Reno	Washoe	Nevada	Reno		
Dini's Lucky Club	Yerington	Lyon	Nevada	Balance of State		
Downtown Grand	Las Vegas	Clark	Nevada	Las Vegas Downtown		Formerly Lady Luck Hotel & Casino
Dunes	Paradise	Clark	Nevada	Las Vegas Strip		Defunct; closed and demolished 1993. Now the site of the Bellagio.
Eastside Cannery	Sunrise Manor	Clark	Nevada	Boulder Strip		Defunct; Built on former site of Nevada Palace; closed in 2020 due to the COVID-19 pandemic and never reopened. Boyd Gaming announced in October 2025 that the casino would be demolished due to a lack of customer demand. Imploded in March 2026; the site is planned to be sold for residential development.
Edgewater Hotel and Casino	Laughlin	Clark	Nevada	Laughlin		
El Capitan Hotel & Casino	Hawthorne	Mineral	Nevada	Balance of State		
El Cortez	Las Vegas	Clark	Nevada	Las Vegas Downtown		
El Morocco	West Las Vegas	Clark	Nevada	Balance of Clark County		Defunct; closed 1958. Rebuilt in 1959 as the New El Morocco, closed in 1960, reopened in 1963 and closed for good in 1964.
El Rancho Vegas	Las Vegas	Clark	Nevada	Las Vegas Strip		Defunct; burned down on 17 June 1960. Operated as the El Rancho Vegas Motor Inn in the late 1960s. The Hilton Grand Vacations Club now sits on the southern portion of the site and the Las Vegas Festival Grounds on the remainder.
El Rancho Hotel and Casino	Las Vegas	Clark	Nevada	Las Vegas Strip		Defunct; closed 1992. Demolished in 2000. Now the site of Fontainebleau Las Vegas.
Eldorado Resort Casino	Reno	Washoe	Nevada	Reno		
Ellis Island Casino & Brewery	Paradise	Clark	Nevada	Las Vegas Strip		
Encore	Paradise	Clark	Nevada	Las Vegas Strip		
Eureka	Mesquite	Clark	Nevada	Mesquite		
Excalibur	Paradise	Clark	Nevada	Las Vegas Strip		
Fiesta Henderson	Henderson	Clark	Nevada	Boulder Strip		Defunct; closed 2020 due to the COVID-19 pandemic and never reopened. Demolished in 2022 except for the parking garage and sold to the City of Henderson; an indoor recreational sports center is planned for the site.
Fiesta Rancho	North Las Vegas	Clark	Nevada	North Las Vegas		Defunct; closed 2020 due to the COVID-19 pandemic and never reopened. Demolished in 2023; a mixed-use community called Hylo Park is planned to be built on the site, including a 150-room hotel, retail space and two new ice rinks; the existing rink would be converted into an indoor stadium.
Fitzgeralds Reno	Reno	Washoe	Nevada	Reno		Defunct; closed 2008, converted to a hotel
Flamingo Las Vegas	Paradise	Clark	Nevada	Las Vegas Strip		Formerly known as Flamingo Hilton Las Vegas
Fontainebleau Las Vegas	Las Vegas	Clark	Nevada	Las Vegas Strip		Formerly Algiers and El Rancho; planned to open in 2023; was The Drew Las Vegas from 2018 to 2021
Four Jacks Hotel & Casino	Jackpot	Elko	Nevada	Balance of Elko County		
Four Queens	Las Vegas	Clark	Nevada	Las Vegas Downtown		
Fremont Hotel and Casino	Las Vegas	Clark	Nevada	Las Vegas Downtown		
Gold County Inn & Casino	Elko	Elko	Nevada	Balance of Elko County		Operated by Navegante Group
Gold Coast	Paradise	Clark	Nevada	Las Vegas Strip		
Gold Dust West Carson	Carson City		Nevada	Carson Valley Area		Formerly known as Pinon Plaza
Gold Dust West Elko	Elko	Elko	Nevada	Elko		
Gold Dust West Reno	Reno	Washoe	Nevada	Reno		
Gold Ranch Dayton	Dayton	Lyon	Nevada	Dayton		
Gold Ranch Sparks	Sparks	Washoe	Nevada	Sparks		
Gold Ranch Verdi	Verdi	Washoe	Nevada	Balance of Washoe County		
Gold Rush Casino	Henderson	Clark	Nevada	Boulder Strip		
Gold Spike	Las Vegas	Clark	Nevada	Las Vegas Downtown		Casino closed on 14 April 2013, converted to a restaurant/bar and residential building
Golden Gate Casino	Las Vegas	Clark	Nevada	Las Vegas Downtown		
Golden Nugget Las Vegas	Las Vegas	Clark	Nevada	Las Vegas Downtown		
Golden Nugget Laughlin	Laughlin	Clark	Nevada	Laughlin		
Golden Phoenix	Reno	Washoe	Nevada	Reno		Defunct; closed October 2006; formerly known as Sahara Reno, Reno Hilton, Flamingo Hilton Reno and Flamingo Reno; converted into a condominium tower
Grand Lodge Casino at Hyatt Regency Lake Tahoe	Incline Village	Washoe	Nevada	North Lake Tahoe		
Grand Sierra Resort	Reno	Washoe	Nevada	Reno		Formerly known as MGM Grand Reno, Bally's Reno and Reno Hilton
Green Valley Ranch	Henderson	Clark	Nevada	Boulder Strip		
Hacienda	Paradise	Clark	Nevada	Las Vegas Strip		Defunct; closed 1996. Demolished and now site of Mandalay Bay.
Hard Rock Lake Tahoe	Stateline	Douglas	Nevada	South Lake Tahoe		Formerly known as Sahara Tahoe, High Sierra and Horizon Lake Tahoe
Hard Rock Hotel	Paradise	Clark	Nevada	Las Vegas Strip		Defunct; closed 2020, reopened as Virgin Hotels Las Vegas
Harold's Club	Reno	Washoe	Nevada	Reno		Defunct; closed 1995. Demolished 1999. Now an outdoor plaza.
Harrah's Lake Tahoe	Stateline	Douglas	Nevada	South Lake Tahoe		Formerly the Stateline Country Club and the Nevada Club
Harrah's Las Vegas	Paradise	Clark	Nevada	Las Vegas Strip		
Harrah's Laughlin	Laughlin	Clark	Nevada	Laughlin		
Harrah's Reno	Reno	Washoe	Nevada	Reno		Defunct; closed 2020 due to the COVID-19 pandemic. Will become a mixed-use development named Reno City Center.
Harveys Lake Tahoe	Stateline	Douglas	Nevada	South Lake Tahoe		Formerly Harvey's Wagon Wheel and Harrah's Club
High Desert Casino	Elko	Elko	Nevada	Balance of Elko County		Operated by Navegante Group
Holy Cow	Las Vegas	Clark	Nevada	Las Vegas Downtown		Defunct; closed 22 March 2002, demolished April 2012. A Walgreens store now stands on the site.
Hoover Dam Lodge	Outside Boulder City limits	Clark	Nevada	Balance of Clark County		On parcel of private land within Lake Mead National Recreation Area; formerly Gold Strike and Hacienda
Horseshoe Hotel & Casino	Elko	Elko	Nevada	Balance of Elko County		
Horseshoe Las Vegas	Paradise	Clark	Nevada	Las Vegas Strip		Formerly Bally's
Hotel Nevada and Gambling Hall	Ely	White Pine	Nevada	Balance of State		
Indian Springs Casino	Indian Springs	Clark	Nevada	Balance of Clark County		
Jail House Motel & Casino	Ely	White Pine	Nevada	Balance of State		
Jerry's Nugget	North Las Vegas	Clark	Nevada	North Las Vegas		
Jim Kelley's Nugget Casino	Crystal Bay	Washoe	Nevada	South Lake Tahoe		
Jokers Wild Casino	Henderson	Clark	Nevada	Boulder Strip		Formerly Cattle Baron Casino
Jolly Trolley Casino	2440 Las Vegas Blvd. South	Clark	Nevada	Las Vegas Strip		Defunct; formerly ... opened May 23, 1975
Key Largo	Paradise	Clark	Nevada	Las Vegas Strip		Defunct; closed 2005. Demolished in 2013 following a fire.
Kings Castle Hotel and Casino	Incline Village	Washoe	Nevada	North Lake Tahoe		Defunct; closed 1972
Kings Inn	Reno	Washoe	Nevada	Reno		Defunct; closed 1982 (casino) and 1986 (hotel). Redeveloped into a mixed-use development in 2014.
Klondike Hotel and Casino	Paradise	Clark	Nevada	Las Vegas Strip		Defunct; closed June 2006. Demolished March 2008. Now a Harley-Davidson dealership as of 2014.
Klondike Sunset Casino	Henderson	Clark	Nevada	Boulder Strip		
La Bayou	Las Vegas	Clark	Nevada	Las Vegas Downtown		Defunct; closed June 2016. Demolished 2016. Now part of Golden Gate.
Lakeside Inn	Stateline	Douglas	Nevada	South Lake Tahoe		Formerly known as Caesars Inn and Harvey's Inn; Defunct; closed 2020 due to effects of the COVID-19 pandemic. Planned to be demolished and replaced by a healthcare facility.
Landmark	Winchester	Clark	Nevada	Las Vegas Strip		Defunct; closed 1990. Demolished 1995 and became a parking lot for the Las Vegas Convention Center. The LVCC's West Hall expansion now sits on the site.
Las Vegas Club	Las Vegas	Clark	Nevada	Las Vegas Downtown		Defunct; closed 19 August 2015. Demolished and now site of Circa Resort & Casino.
Laughlin River Lodge	Laughlin	Clark	Nevada	Laughlin		Formerly known as Sam's Town Gold River, Gold River and River Palms
Longstreet Hotel, Casino, and RV Resort	Amargosa Valley	Nye	Nevada	Balance of State		
Louisiana Club	West Las Vegas	Clark	Nevada	Balance of Clark County		Defunct; closed 20 May 1970
Lucky Club Hotel & Casino	North Las Vegas	Clark	Nevada	North Las Vegas		Formerly known as Speedway Casino
Lucky Dragon	Las Vegas	Clark	Nevada	Las Vegas Strip		Defunct; closed 2018, reopened as Ahern Hotel and Convention Center
Luxor	Paradise	Clark	Nevada	Las Vegas Strip		
M Resort	Henderson	Clark	Nevada			
Main Street Station Hotel	Las Vegas	Clark	Nevada	Las Vegas Downtown		
Mandalay Bay	Paradise	Clark	Nevada	Las Vegas Strip		Former site of Hacienda
Mapes Hotel	Reno	Washoe	Nevada	Reno		Defunct; closed December 1982; demolished January 2000. Now an outdoor skating rink.
Max Casino	Carson City		Nevada	Carson Valley Area		
Mermaids Casino	Las Vegas	Clark	Nevada	Las Vegas Downtown		Defunct; closed 27 June 2016. Demolished and now site of Circa Resort & Casino.
Mesquite Star	Mesquite	Clark	Nevada	Mesquite		Defunct; closed March 2000. Now the Rising Star Sports Ranch.
MGM Grand Las Vegas	Paradise	Clark	Nevada	Las Vegas Strip		
Mint Casino	Sparks	Washoe	Nevada	Sparks		
Model T Casino	Winnemucca	Humboldt	Nevada	Balance of State		
Montego Bay Resort	West Wendover	Elko	Nevada	Wendover		Formerly the Silver Smith Casino—operated by Peppermill casino properties
Mountain View Casino	Pahrump	Nye	Nevada	Balance of State		
Moulin Rouge	West Las Vegas	Clark	Nevada	Balance of Clark County		Defunct; closed November 1955. Partially demolished 2010 and completely demolished in 2017. First desegregated casino.
Nevada Landing	Jean	Clark	Nevada	Balance of Clark County		Defunct; closed 20 March 2007. Demolished March 2008. Site sold off in 2022 to a developer with plans for a 3 million square foot mega-warehouse complex.
Nevada Palace Hotel & Casino	Sunrise Manor	Clark	Nevada	Boulder Strip		Defunct; closed 29 February 2008. Demolished and now site of Eastside Cannery.
New Frontier	Paradise	Clark	Nevada	Las Vegas Strip		Defunct; closed 16 July 2007. Formerly Pair-O' Dice/91 Club (1931-1942), Hotel Last Frontier (1942-1955) and New Frontier (1955-1965). Demolished November 2007. Still-vacant land owned by Wynn Resorts since early 2018.
New York-New York	Paradise	Clark	Nevada	Las Vegas Strip		
Nugget Casino Resort	Sparks	Washoe	Nevada	Sparks		Formerly known as Dick Graves' Nugget and John Ascuaga's Nugget
Oasis	Mesquite	Clark	Nevada	Mesquite		Defunct; closed in 2010. Demolished in 2013.
Opera House	North Las Vegas	Clark	Nevada	North Las Vegas		Defunct; closed in 2014 and later demolished. A Dotty's slot machine parlor now sits on the site.
Ormsby House	Carson City		Nevada	Carson Valley Area		Defunct; closed in 2000 for remodeling. Put up for sale in June 2019, planned to be converted into housing and retail space.
O'Shea's	Winchester	Clark	Nevada	Las Vegas Strip		Original location closed on April 30, 2012. Relocated to The Linq and opened in 2013. The original site is now the Vortex, a multi-story structure marking the entrance to the Linq Promenade.
Owl Club Bar and Restaurant	Eureka	Eureka	Nevada	Balance of State		
Owl Club Casino & Restaurant	Battle Mountain	Lander	Nevada	Balance of State		
Oyo Hotel & Casino	Paradise	Clark	Nevada	Las Vegas Strip		Formerly Hooters Casino Hotel, Hôtel San Rémo, Paradise Hotel, and Howard Johnson Hotel
Pahrump Nugget Hotel & Gambling Hall	Pahrump	Nye	Nevada	Balance of State		
Pahrump Station Hotel & Casino	Pahrump	Nye	Nevada	Balance of State		
Palace Station	Las Vegas	Clark	Nevada			
Paris Las Vegas	Paradise	Clark	Nevada	Las Vegas Strip		
Palms Casino Resort	Paradise	Clark	Nevada	Las Vegas Strip		Temporarily closed from March 2020 due to the COVID-19 pandemic. Sold to San Manuel Band of Mission Indians and reopened in April 2022.
Park MGM	Paradise	Clark	Nevada	Las Vegas Strip		Formerly Monte Carlo
People's Choice Casino	West Las Vegas	Clark	Nevada	Balance of Clark County		Defunct; closed sometime after 1991
Peppermill Reno	Reno	Washoe	Nevada	Reno		
Peppermill Wendover	West Wendover	Elko	Nevada	Wendover		
Pete's Gambling Hall	Winnemucca	Humboldt	Nevada	Balance of State		
Pioneer Club Las Vegas	Las Vegas	Clark	Nevada	Las Vegas Downtown		Defunct; closed 1995. Now a gift shop.
Pioneer Hotel & Gambling Hall	Laughlin	Clark	Nevada	Laughlin		
Planet Hollywood Las Vegas	Paradise	Clark	Nevada	Las Vegas Strip		Formerly The Aladdin
Plaza Hotel & Casino	Las Vegas	Clark	Nevada	Las Vegas Downtown		
Poker Palace	North Las Vegas	Clark	Nevada	North Las Vegas		
Primm Valley Resort	Primm	Clark	Nevada	Balance of Clark County		Planned to close in July 2026.
Prospectors Casino	Ely	White Pine	Nevada	Balance of State		
Rail City Casino	Sparks	Washoe	Nevada	Sparks		Formerly Plantation Casino
Railroad Pass Hotel & Casino	Henderson	Clark	Nevada	Henderson		
Rainbow Casino	West Wendover	Elko	Nevada	Wendover		
Ramada/Copper Queen Casino	Ely	White Pine	Nevada	Balance of State		
Rampart Casino	Summerlin	Clark	Nevada	Balance of Clark County		
Red Garter	West Wendover	Elko	Nevada	Wendover		Operated by Holder Hospitality Group
Red Lion Casino	Elko	Elko	Nevada	Balance of Elko County		Operated by Navegante Group
Red Rock Resort	Summerlin	Clark	Nevada	Balance of Clark County		
Regency Casino	Laughlin	Clark	Nevada	Laughlin		
Reno Nugget Casino	Reno	Washoe	Nevada	Reno		
Resorts World	Winchester	Clark	Nevada	Las Vegas Strip		Formerly Stardust
Roadhouse Casino	Henderson	Clark	Nevada	Boulder Strip		
Rio	Paradise	Clark	Nevada	Las Vegas Strip		
Riverside Hotel Casino	Reno	Washoe	Nevada	Reno		Defunct; casino closed 1986; hotel closed 1987. Now an apartment building.
Riverside Resort Hotel & Casino	Laughlin	Clark	Nevada	Laughlin		
Riviera Hotel and Casino	Winchester	Clark	Nevada	Las Vegas Strip		Defunct; closed May 2016, imploded August 2016. A portion of the land is now part of the Las Vegas Global Business District and the remainder was sold.
Royal Nevada	Winchester	Clark	Nevada	Las Vegas Strip		Defunct; closed 1958 and converted into a convention center for the Stardust. Resorts World Las Vegas now sits on the site.
Saddle West Casino	Pahrump	Nye	Nevada	Balance of State		
Sahara Las Vegas	Winchester	Clark	Nevada	Las Vegas Strip		Formerly known as SLS Las Vegas from 2013 to 2019, returned to its original name
Sands Regency	Reno	Washoe	Nevada	Reno		
Sam's Town Hotel and Gambling Hall	Sunrise Manor	Clark	Nevada	Boulder Strip		
Santa Fe Station	North Las Vegas	Clark	Nevada	North Las Vegas		
Say When Casino	McDermitt	Humboldt	Nevada	Balance of State		
Scoreboard Sports Lounge	Spring Creek	Elko	Nevada	Balance of Elko County		
Searchlight Nugget Casino	Searchlight	Clark	Nevada			
Sharkeys Casino	Gardnerville	Douglas	Nevada	Carson Valley Area		
Sierra Sid's 76	Sparks	Washoe	Nevada	Sparks		
Silver City Casino	Winchester	Clark	Nevada	Las Vegas Strip		Defunct; closed 1999. Demolished in 2004. Now the site of Silver City Plaza. A marquee from the old casino is still standing on Convention Center Drive.
Silver Legacy Reno	Reno	Washoe	Nevada	Reno		
Silver Nugget	North Las Vegas	Clark	Nevada	North Las Vegas		
Silver Sevens	Paradise	Clark	Nevada	Las Vegas Strip		
Silver Slipper	Paradise	Clark	Nevada	Las Vegas Strip		Defunct; closed 1988. Demolished in 1989 and became a parking lot for the Frontier.
Silverton	Enterprise	Clark	Nevada	Balance of Clark County		Formerly Boomtown Blue Diamond and Boomtown Las Vegas
Siena Reno	Reno	Washoe	Nevada	Reno		Defunct; casino closed in 2015 and remodeled into a non-casino hotel. Formerly Holiday Reno and Siena Reno.
Slots-A-Fun Casino	Winchester	Clark	Nevada	Las Vegas Strip		
Skyline Casino	Henderson	Clark	Nevada			
South Point	Enterprise	Clark	Nevada	Las Vegas Strip		
Stagedoor Casino	Paradise	Clark	Nevada			
Stagestop Casino	Pahrump	Nye	Nevada	Balance of State		
Stagecoach Hotel & Casino	Beatty	Nye	Nevada	Balance of State		
Stardust	Winchester	Clark	Nevada	Las Vegas Strip		Defunct; closed 2006. Imploded in 2007. Now the site of Resorts World Las Vegas.
Stateline Casino	West Wendover	Elko	Nevada	Wendover		Defunct; closed 2004. Renamed Wendover Nugget Hotel and Casino.
Stateline Casino and Motel	Mesquite	Clark	Nevada	Mesquite		
Stockmen's Casino & Hotel	Elko	Elko	Nevada	Balance of Elko County		
Stockman's Casino	Fallon	Churchill	Nevada	Williams Ave		
Suncoast	Las Vegas	Clark	Nevada	Balance of Clark County		
Sundance Casino	Winnemucca	Humboldt	Nevada	Balance of State		
Sunset Station	Henderson	Clark	Nevada	Boulder Strip		
Tamarack Junction	Reno	Washoe	Nevada	Reno		
Tahoe Biltmore	Crystal Bay	Washoe	Nevada	South Lake Tahoe		
Terrible's Casino Searchlight	Searchlight	Clark	Nevada	Balance of Clark County		
Terrible's Hotel & Casino	Jean	Clark	Nevada	Balance of Clark County		Defunct; closed 2020. Planned to be demolished and replaced by an industrial park. Formerly known as Gold Strike
Terrible's Town Henderson	Henderson	Clark	Nevada	Boulder Strip		Defunct; closed 2013
Terrible's Town Pahrump	Pahrump	Nye	Nevada	Balance of State		
Terrible's Lakeside	Pahrump	Nye	Nevada	Balance of State		
Texas Station	North Las Vegas	Clark	Nevada	North Las Vegas		Defunct; closed in 2020 due to the COVID-19 pandemic and never reopened. Demolished 2022-2023; a mixed-use community called Hylo Park is planned to be built on the site, with houses and retail space.
The Alamo Casino	Sparks	Washoe	Nevada	Sparks		
The D Las Vegas	Las Vegas	Clark	Nevada	Las Vegas Downtown		Formerly known as Sundance Las Vegas and Fitzgeralds Las Vegas, renamed in 2012
The Linq	Paradise	Clark	Nevada	Las Vegas Strip		Formerly Imperial Palace and The Quad
The Meadows Casino & Hotel	Las Vegas	Clark	Nevada	Balance of Clark County		Defunct; closed 1942. Later demolished after it caught fire. First resort hotel-casino in Las Vegas.
The Mint	Las Vegas	Clark	Nevada	Las Vegas Downtown		Defunct; closed 1988. Now part of Binion's Horseshoe.
The Mirage	Paradise	Clark	Nevada	Las Vegas Strip		Formerly Castaways. Defunct; closed July 2024. Will be rebranded as Hard Rock Las Vegas with reopening planned for 2027.
The Orleans	Paradise	Clark	Nevada	Balance of Clark County		
The Nevada Casino & Bar	Battle Mountain	Lander	Nevada	Balance of State		
The Palazzo	Paradise	Clark	Nevada	Las Vegas Strip		
The Pass	Henderson	Clark	Nevada	Boulder Strip		Formerly Wheel Casino and Eldorado Casino
The Pony Express Casino	Elko	Elko	Nevada	Balance of Elko County		
The Sands	Paradise	Clark	Nevada	Las Vegas Strip		Defunct; closed 1996. Now the site of The Venetian.
The Station House	Tonopah	Nye	Nevada	Balance of State		
The Strat	Las Vegas	Clark	Nevada	Las Vegas Strip		Formerly Stratosphere
The Vanderpump	Paradise	Clark	Nevada	Las Vegas Strip		Formerly Barbary Coast, Bill's Gamblin' Hall and Saloon and The Cromwell
The Venetian	Paradise	Clark	Nevada	Las Vegas Strip		Formerly the Sands
The Western	Las Vegas	Clark	Nevada	Las Vegas Downtown		Defunct; closed January 2012
Tonopah Station	Tonopah	Nye	Nevada	Balance of State		
Topaz Lodge	Topaz Lake	Douglas	Nevada	Carson Valley Area		
Town Tavern	West Las Vegas	Clark	Nevada	Balance of Clark County		Defunct; closed 2013. Was Town Tavern from 1955 to 1959, then "New" Town Tavern from then until the 1990s, after which it became "Ultra New" Town Tavern. The sign was changed to "Tokyo Casino" in 2016, but the club never reopened under this name. Burned down in October 2023.
Treasure Island	Paradise	Clark	Nevada	Las Vegas Strip		
Tropicana Las Vegas	Paradise	Clark	Nevada	Las Vegas Strip		Defunct; closed April 2024. Demolished by October 2024 to make way for the New Las Vegas Stadium.
Tropicana Laughlin	Laughlin	Clark	Nevada	Laughlin		Formerly Ramada Express and Tropicana Express
Tuscany Suites and Casino	Paradise	Clark	Nevada	Las Vegas Strip		
Vacation Village	Enterprise	Clark	Nevada			Defunct; closed January 2002. Demolished in 2004. The southeastern portion of Town Square now sits on the site.
Vegas World	Las Vegas	Clark	Nevada	Las Vegas Strip		Defunct; closed 1995. Remodeled and integrated into Stratosphere.
Virgin River Casino	Mesquite	Clark	Nevada	Mesquite		
Virgin Hotels Las Vegas	Paradise	Clark	Nevada	Paradise		Formerly the Hard Rock Hotel
Wendover Nugget	West Wendover	Elko	Nevada	Wendover		Formerly the Stateline Casino
Western Village	Sparks	Washoe	Nevada	Sparks		
Westgate Las Vegas Resort & Casino	Winchester	Clark	Nevada	Las Vegas Strip		Formerly the International Hotel, Las Vegas Hilton and LVH
Westin Las Vegas	Paradise	Clark	Nevada	Las Vegas Strip		Defunct; casino closed July 2017 and converted to a hotel. Formerly the Maxim and Westin Causarina Las Vegas Hotel
Westward Ho	Winchester	Clark	Nevada	Las Vegas Strip		Defunct; closed 17 November 2005. Demolished in 2006. A McDonald's now sits on a portion of the site.
Wildfire Casino		Clark	Nevada	Balance of Clark County		
Wild Wild West	Paradise	Clark	Nevada			Defunct; closed 7 September 2022 and planned to be demolished for future development. In April 2023, Station Casinos agreed to sell 49 acres of the site to the Oakland Athletics for development of their new ballpark, but this was changed to the Tropicana Las Vegas a month later.
Winnemucca Inn & Casino	Winnemucca	Humboldt	Nevada	Balance of State		Formerly the Red Lion Hotel & Casino (until 2008/2009)
Winners Inn Casino	Winnemucca	Humboldt	Nevada	Balance of State		
Whiskey Pete's	Primm	Clark	Nevada	Balance of Clark County		Planned to close in July 2026.
Wynn Las Vegas	Paradise	Clark	Nevada	Las Vegas Strip		Formerly the Desert Inn
Atlantic Club Casino Hotel	Atlantic City	Atlantic	New Jersey	Boardwalk		Formerly Golden Nugget, Bally's Grand, The Grand, Atlantic City Hilton, ACH; Closed. Currently vacant.
Bally's Atlantic City	Atlantic City	Atlantic	New Jersey	Boardwalk		Formerly Bally's Park Place
The Borgata	Atlantic City	Atlantic	New Jersey	Marina		
Caesars Atlantic City	Atlantic City	Atlantic	New Jersey	Boardwalk		Formerly Caesars Boardwalk Regency
Claridge Hotel & Casino	Atlantic City	Atlantic	New Jersey	Boardwalk		Taken over by Bally's; Casino closed + sold (now a Radisson non-casino property)
Golden Nugget Atlantic City	Atlantic City	Atlantic	New Jersey	Marina		Formerly Trump Castle, Trump Marina.
Harrah's Atlantic City	Atlantic City	Atlantic	New Jersey	Marina		First casino to open in Marina District; Formerly Harrah's Marina
Resorts Casino Hotel	Atlantic City	Atlantic	New Jersey	Boardwalk		First casino to open in Atlantic city; Formerly Merv Griffin's Resorts.
Ocean Resort Atlantic City	Atlantic City	Atlantic	New Jersey	Boardwalk		Formerly Revel Atlantic City
Sands Atlantic City	Atlantic City	Atlantic	New Jersey	Boardwalk		First brand new casino built from ground up in Atlantic City; Formerly Brighton Casino; Closed + Imploded
Showboat Atlantic City	Atlantic City	Atlantic	New Jersey	Boardwalk		Closed; now operating as a standalone Hotel without casino under the Showboat name.
Tropicana Atlantic City	Atlantic City	Atlantic	New Jersey	Boardwalk		Formerly Trop World
Trump Plaza Hotel and Casino	Atlantic City	Atlantic	New Jersey	Boardwalk		Formerly Harrah's at Trump Plaza; Closed. Currently vacant + slated for demolition.
Hard Rock Atlantic City	Atlantic City	Atlantic	New Jersey	Boardwalk		Formerly Trump Taj Mahal
Trump World's Fair	Atlantic City	Atlantic	New Jersey	Boardwalk		Formerly Playboy, Atlantis, Trump Regency (hotel only); Closed + demolished.
Apache Nugget Casino	Cuba	Sandoval	New Mexico		Native American	
Billy the Kid Casino	Ruidoso	Lincoln	New Mexico		Racino	Also known as Ruidoso Downs Race Track & Casino
Buffalo Thunder Casino and Resort	Pojoaque Pueblo	Santa Fe	New Mexico		Native American	north of Santa Fe
Tesuque Casino	Tesuque Pueblo	Santa Fe	New Mexico		Native American	north of Santa Fe
Casino Apache Travel Center	Mescalero	Otero	New Mexico		Native American	
Casino Hollywood	San Felipe	Sandoval	New Mexico		Native American	
Cities of Gold Casino	Pojoaque Pueblo	Santa Fe	New Mexico		Native American	north of Santa Fe
Dancing Eagle Casino	Casa Blanca	Cibola	New Mexico		Native American	
Downs at Albuquerque	Albuquerque	Bernalillo	New Mexico		Racino	
Fire Rock Navajo Casino	Church Rock	McKinley	New Mexico		Native American	
Inn of the Mountain Gods Resort & Casino	Mescalero	Otero	New Mexico		Native American	
Isleta Resort & Casino	Isleta Pueblo	Bernalillo	New Mexico		Native American	south of Albuquerque
Kicks 66/Convenience Store & Phillips 66 Service	Santa Fe	Santa Fe	New Mexico		Native American	
Northern Edge Navajo Casino	Fruitland	San Juan	New Mexico		Native American	
Ohkay Casino Resort	San Juan Pueblo	Rio Arriba	New Mexico		Native American	Ohkay Owingeh Pueblo
Palace West	Isleta	Bernalillo	New Mexico		Native American	
Route 66 Casino	Laguna Pueblo	Bernalillo	New Mexico		Native American	west of Albuquerque
Route 66 Casino Express	Laguna Pueblo	Bernalillo	New Mexico		Native American	west of Albuquerque; features 120 slots only
Sandia Resort and Casino	Sandia Pueblo	Bernalillo	New Mexico		Native American	north of Albuquerque
Santa Ana Star Casino	Santa Ana Pueblo	Sandoval	New Mexico		Native American	northwest of Albuquerque/Rio Rancho
Santa Claran Hotel & Casino	Española	Rio Arriba	New Mexico		Native American	
Sky City Casino	Acoma	Cibola	New Mexico		Native American	
Sun Ray Park & Casino	Farmington	San Juan	New Mexico		Racino	
Sunland Park Racetrack & Casino	Sunland Park	Doña Ana	New Mexico		Racino	
Taos Mountain Casino	Taos	Taos	New Mexico		Native American	
Wild Horse Casino	Dulce	Rio Arriba	New Mexico		Native American	
Zia Park Casino, Hotel & Racetrack	Hobbs	Lea	New Mexico		Racino	
Akwesasne Mohawk Casino	Hogansburg	Franklin	New York		Native American	Mohawk affiliated; Opened in 1999
Batavia Downs Casino	Batavia	Genesee	New York		Racino	Opened in 2005
Del Lago Resort and Casino	Tyre	Seneca	New York		Commercial	Live table games; Opened in 2017
Empire City Casino at Yonkers Raceway	Yonkers	Westchester	New York		Racino	Electronic table games; Opened in 2006
The Fairgrounds Gaming	Hamburg	Erie	New York		Racino	Opened in 2010
Jake's 58 Hotel & Casino	Islandia	Suffolk	New York		Commercial	Electronic table games; Opened in 2017
Finger Lakes Gaming and Race Track	Farmington	Ontario	New York		Racino	Opened in 2004
Lakeside Entertainment	Seneca Falls	Seneca	New York		Native American	Cayuga affiliated; Opened in 2022
Lakeside Entertainment	Union Springs	Cayuga	New York		Native American	Cayuga affiliated; Opened in 2014
Point Place Casino	Bridgeport	Madison	New York		Native American	Oneida affiliated; Opened in 2018
Resorts World Catskills	Kiamesha Lake	Sullivan	New York		Commercial	Live table games; Opened in 2018
Resorts World Hudson Valley	Newburgh	Orange	New York		Commercial	Opened in 2022
Resorts World New York City	Ozone Park	Queens	New York		Commercial	Live table games; Opened in 2011
Rivers Casino & Resort	Schenectady	Schenectady	New York		Commercial	Live table games; Opened in 2017
Saratoga Casino and Raceway	Saratoga Springs	Saratoga	New York		Racino	Opened in 2004
Seneca Allegany Casino	Salamanca	Cattaraugus	New York		Native American	Seneca affiliated; Opened in 2012
Seneca Buffalo Creek Casino	Buffalo	Erie	New York		Native American	Seneca affiliated; Opened in 2007
Seneca Gaming and Entertainment Irving	Irving	Cattaraugus	New York		Native American	Seneca affiliated
Seneca Gaming and Entertainment Oil Spring	Cuba	Allegany	New York		Native American	Seneca affiliated; Opened in 2014
Seneca Gaming and Entertainment Salamanca	Salamanca	Cattaraugus	New York		Native American	Seneca affiliated; Opened in 2004
Seneca Niagara Casino	Niagara Falls	Niagara	New York		Native American	Seneca affiliated; Opened in 2002
Tioga Downs & Casino	Nichols	Tioga	New York		Commercial	Live table games; Opened in 2006
Turning Stone Resort & Casino	Verona	Oneida	New York		Native American	Oneida affiliated; Opened in 1993
Vernon Downs & Casino	Vernon	Oneida	New York		Racino	Opened in 2006
Yellow Brick Road Casino	Chittenango	Madison	New York		Native American	Oneida affiliated; Opened in 2015
Harrah's Cherokee	Cherokee	Jackson	North Carolina		Native American	Owned by the Eastern Band of Cherokee Indians
Catawba Two Kings Casino	Kings Mountain	Cleveland	North Carolina		Native American	Owned by the Catawba Indian Nation; temporary facility open
Harrah's Cherokee Valley River	Murphy	Cherokee	North Carolina		Native American	Owned by the Eastern Band of Cherokee Indians
Dakota Magic Casino & Hotel	Hankinson	Richland	North Dakota		Native American	Owned by the Sisseton Wahpeton Oyate
Four Bears Casino & Lodge	Four Bears Village	McKenzie	North Dakota		Native American	Owned by the Mandan, Hidatsa, and Arikara Nation
Prairie Knights Casino and Resort	Fort Yates	Sioux	North Dakota		Native American	Owned by the Standing Rock Sioux
Skydancer Casino	Belcourt	Rolette	North Dakota		Native American	Owned by the Turtle Mountain Band of Chippewa Indians
Spirit Lake Casino	Fort Totten	Benson	North Dakota		Native American	Owned by the Spirit Lake Tribe
Belterra Park Cincinnati	Anderson Township	Hamilton	Ohio		Racino	Formerly known as River Downs. Opened May 1, 2014 with 1,600 video lottery terminals. No table games.
Eldorado Gaming Scioto Downs	Columbus	Franklin	Ohio		Racino	Opened June 1, 2012 with 2,100 video lottery terminals. No table games.
Hard Rock Casino Cincinnati	Cincinnati	Hamilton	Ohio		Land-based	Opened March 4, 2013.
Hollywood Casino Columbus	Columbus	Franklin	Ohio		Land-based	Opened October 8, 2012.
Hollywood Casino Toledo	Toledo	Lucas	Ohio		Land-based	Opened May 29, 2012.
Hollywood Gaming at Dayton Raceway	Dayton	Montgomery	Ohio		Racino	Relocation of Raceway Park. Opened August 28, 2014 with 1,000 video lottery terminals. No table games.
Hollywood Gaming at Mahoning Valley Race Course	Austintown	Mahoning	Ohio		Racino	Relocation of Beulah Park. Opened September 17, 2014 with 850 video lottery terminals. No table games.
Jack Cleveland Casino	Cleveland	Cuyahoga	Ohio	Public Square	Land-based	Ohio's first casino opened on May 14, 2012 in the historic former Higbee's Building in Tower City Center on Public Square.
Jack Thistledown Racino	North Randall	Cuyahoga	Ohio		Racino	Opened April 9, 2013 with 1,100 video lottery terminals. No table games.
MGM Northfield Park	Northfield	Summit	Ohio		Racino	Opened December 18, 2013 with 2,300 video lottery terminals. No table games.
Miami Valley Gaming	Turtlecreek Township	Warren	Ohio		Racino	Relocation of Lebanon Raceway. Opened December 12, 2013 with 2,500 video lottery terminals. No table games.
Ada Gaming Center	Ada	Pontotoc	Oklahoma	South-Central - Arbuckle Country	Native American	
Apache Casino Hotel	Lawton	Comanche	Oklahoma	Southwest - Great Plains Country	Native American	
Border Casino	Thackerville	Love	Oklahoma	South-Central - Arbuckle Country	Native American	
Buffalo Run Casino	Miami	Ottawa	Oklahoma	Northeast - Green Country	Native American	
Cherokee Casino Will Rogers Downs	Claremore	Rogers	Oklahoma	Northeast - Green Country	Racino	
Cash Springs Gaming Center	Sulphur	Murray	Oklahoma	South-Central - Arbuckle Country	Native American	
Cherokee Casino	Fort Gibson	Cherokee	Oklahoma	Northeast - Green Country	Native American	
Cherokee Casino	Roland	Sequoyah	Oklahoma	Northeast - Green Country	Native American	
Cherokee Casino	Sallisaw	Sequoyah	Oklahoma	Northeast - Green Country	Native American	
Cherokee Casino	Tahlequah	Cherokee	Oklahoma	Northeast - Green Country	Native American	
Cherokee Casino	West Siloam Springs	Delaware	Oklahoma	Northeast - Green Country	Native American	
Chisholm Trail Casino	Duncan	Stephens	Oklahoma	Southwest - Great Plains Country	Native American	
Choctaw Casino & Resort	Durant	Bryan	Oklahoma	Southeast - Kiamichi Country	Native American	
Choctaw Casino	Broken Bow	McCurtain	Oklahoma	Southeast - Kiamichi Country	Native American	
Choctaw Casino	Grant	Choctaw	Oklahoma	Southeast - Kiamichi Country	Native American	
Choctaw Casino	Idabel	McCurtain	Oklahoma	Southeast - Kiamichi Country	Native American	
Choctaw Casino	McAlester	Pittsburg	Oklahoma	Southeast - Kiamichi Country	Native American	
Choctaw Casino	Pocola	Le Flore	Oklahoma	Southeast - Kiamichi Country	Native American	
Choctaw Casino	Stringtown	Atoka	Oklahoma	Southeast - Kiamichi Country	Native American	
Comanche Nation Casino	Lawton	Comanche	Oklahoma	Southwest - Great Plains Country	Native American	
Comanche Red River Casino	Devol	Cotton	Oklahoma	Southwest - Great Plains Country	Native American	
Comanche Spur Casino	Elgin	Comanche	Oklahoma	Southwest - Great Plains Country	Native American	
Comanche Star Casino	Walters	Cotton	Oklahoma	Southwest - Great Plains Country	Native American	
Creek Nation Casino of Eufaula	Eufaula	McIntosh	Oklahoma	Northeast - Green Country	Native American	
Creek Nation Casino of Okmulgee	Okmulgee	Okmulgee	Oklahoma	Northeast - Green Country	Native American	
Downstream Casino Resort	Quapaw	Ottawa	Oklahoma	Northeast - Green Country	Native American	
Eastern Shawnee Casino	Wyandotte	Ottawa	Oklahoma	Northeast - Green Country	Native American	
FireLake Casino	Shawnee	Pottawatomie	Oklahoma	Central - Frontier Country	Native American	Formerly Firelake Grand Casino
Grand Casino Hotel Resort	Shawnee	Pottawatomie	Oklahoma	Central - Frontier Country	Native American	Formerly Firelake Grand Casino
Golden Mesa Casino	Guymon	Texas	Oklahoma	North-West - Panhandle Country	Native American	
Gold Mountain Casino	Ardmore	Carter	Oklahoma	South-Central - Arbuckle Country	Native American	
Grand Lake Casino	Grove	Delaware	Oklahoma	Northeast - Green Country	Native American	
Hard Rock Hotel & Casino Tulsa	Catoosa	Rogers	Oklahoma	Northeast - Green Country	Native American	
Harrah's Oklahoma	Chandler	Lincoln	Oklahoma	Central - Frontier Country	Native American	
High Winds Casino	Miami	Ottawa	Oklahoma	Northeast - Green Country	Native American	
Indigo Sky Casino	West Seneca	Ottawa	Oklahoma	Northeast - Green Country	Native American	
Kickapoo Casino Harrah	Harrah	Pottawatomie	Oklahoma	Central - Frontier Country	Native American	
Kickapoo Casino Shawnee	Shawnee	Pottawatomie	Oklahoma	Central - Frontier Country	Native American	
Kiowa Casino	Devol	Cotton	Oklahoma	Southwest - Great Plains Country	Native American	
Lakecrest Casino-Hotel	Ardmore	Carter	Oklahoma	South-Central - Arbuckle Country	Native American	
Lucky Star Casino	Clinton	Custer	Oklahoma	Southwest - Great Plains Country	Native American	
Lucky Star Casino	Concho	Canadian	Oklahoma	Central - Frontier Country	Native American	
Lucky Turtle Casino	Wyandotte	Ottawa	Oklahoma	Northeast - Green Country	Native American	
Madill Gaming Center	Madill	Marshall	Oklahoma	South-Central - Arbuckle Country	Native American	
Megastar Casino	Willis	Marshall	Oklahoma	South-Central - Arbuckle Country	Native American	
Muscogee Creek Nation Casino	Muskogee	Muskogee	Oklahoma	Northeast - Green Country	Native American	
Newcastle Casino	Newcastle	McClain	Oklahoma	Central - Frontier Country	Native American	
Osage Casino	Bartlesville	Washington	Oklahoma	Northeast - Green Country	Native American	
Osage Casino	Hominy	Osage	Oklahoma	Northeast - Green Country	Native American	
Osage Casino	Pawhuska	Osage	Oklahoma	Northeast - Green Country	Native American	
Osage Casino	Ponca City	Osage	Oklahoma	Northeast - Green Country	Native American	
Osage Casino	Sand Springs	Tulsa	Oklahoma	Northeast - Green Country	Native American	
Osage Casino	Tulsa	Tulsa	Oklahoma	Northeast - Green Country	Native American	
Quapaw Casino	Miami	Ottawa	Oklahoma	Northeast - Green Country	Native American	
Red Hawk Gaming Center	Wetumka	Hughes	Oklahoma	Central - Frontier Country		
Remington Park Racetrack & Casino	Oklahoma City	Oklahoma	Oklahoma	Central - Frontier Country	Racino	Owned by a subsidiary of the Chickasaw Nation
RiverStar Casino	Terral	Jefferson	Oklahoma	South-Central - Arbuckle Country	Native American	
River Spirit Casino Resort	Tulsa	Tulsa	Oklahoma	Northeast - Green Country	Native American	
Riverwind Casino	Norman	Cleveland	Oklahoma	Central - Frontier Country	Native American	
Sac & Fox Casino	Shawnee	Pottawatomie	Oklahoma	Central - Frontier Country	Native American	
SaltCreek Casino	Pocasset	Grady	Oklahoma	Central - Frontier Country	Native American	
Seven Clans	Perry	Noble	Oklahoma	North Central	Native American	
Seven Clans	Red Rock	Noble	Oklahoma	North Central	Native American	
Texoma Casino	Kingston	Marshall	Oklahoma	South Central	Native American	
The Stables Casino	Miami	Ottawa	Oklahoma	Northeast - Green Country	Native American	
Thunderbird Wild Wild West Casino	Norman	Cleveland	Oklahoma	Central - Frontier Country	Native American	
Treasure Valley Casino	Davis	Murray	Oklahoma	South-Central - Arbuckle Country	Native American	
Stigler Casino	Stigler, Oklahoma	Haskell	Oklahoma	South East Oklahoma	Native American	
Washita Casino	Paoli	Garvin	Oklahoma	South-Central - Arbuckle Country	Native American	
West Bay Casino	Kingston	Marshall	Oklahoma	South-Central - Arbuckle Country	Native American	
WinStar World Casino	Thackerville	Love	Oklahoma	South-Central - Arbuckle Country	Native American	World's Largest as of August 2025
Wyandotte Nation Casino	Wyandotte	Ottawa	Oklahoma	Northeast - Green Country	Native American	
Chinook Winds Casino	Lincoln City	Lincoln	Oregon	Oregon Coast	Native American	
Indian Head Casino	Warm Springs	Jefferson	Oregon	Central Oregon	Native American	
Kah-Nee-Ta Casino	Warm Springs	Jefferson	Oregon	Central Oregon	Native American	Closed
Kla-Mo-Ya Casino	Chiloquin	Klamath	Oregon	Southern Oregon	Native American	
The Mill Casino & Hotel	North Bend	Coos	Oregon	Oregon Coast	Native American	
Old Camp Casino	Burns	Harney	Oregon	Eastern Oregon	Native American	Closed
Seven Feathers Hotel & Casino Resort	Canyonville	Douglas	Oregon	Southern Oregon	Native American	
Spirit Mountain Casino	Grand Ronde	Polk	Oregon	Willamette Valley	Native American	
Three Rivers Casino	Florence	Lane	Oregon	Oregon Coast	Native American	
Three Rivers Casino Coos Bay	Coos Bay	Coos	Oregon	Oregon Coast	Native American	
Wildhorse Resort & Casino	Pendleton	Umatilla	Oregon	Eastern Oregon	Native American	
Harrah's Philadelphia	Chester	Delaware	Pennsylvania		Racino	
Hollywood Casino at Penn National Race Course	Grantville	Dauphin	Pennsylvania		Racino	
Hollywood Casino at The Meadows	North Strabane Twp.	Washington	Pennsylvania		Racino	
Hollywood Casino Morgantown	Morgantown	Berks	Pennsylvania		Mini-casino	
Hollywood Casino York	York	York	Pennsylvania		Mini-casino	
The Casino at Nemacolin	Farmington	Fayette	Pennsylvania		Resort	
Live! Casino Pittsburgh	Greensburg	Westmoreland	Pennsylvania		Mini-casino	
Live! Casino & Hotel Philadelphia	Philadelphia	Philadelphia	Pennsylvania		Stand-alone	
Mohegan Pennsylvania	Plains Township	Luzerne	Pennsylvania	Poconos	Racino	
Mount Airy Casino Resort	Mount Pocono	Monroe	Pennsylvania	Poconos	Stand-alone	
Parx Casino and Racing	Bensalem	Bucks	Pennsylvania		Racino	
Parx Casino Shippensburg	Shippensburg	Cumberland	Pennsylvania		Mini-casino	
Presque Isle Downs	Erie	Erie	Pennsylvania		Racino	
Rivers Casino Philadelphia	Philadelphia	Philadelphia	Pennsylvania	Riverfront	Stand-alone	
Rivers Casino Pittsburgh	Pittsburgh	Allegheny	Pennsylvania	Chateau	Stand-alone	
Valley Forge Casino Resort	Upper Merion Twp.	Montgomery	Pennsylvania		Resort	
Wind Creek Bethlehem	Bethlehem	Northampton	Pennsylvania	South Side	Stand-alone	
Bally's Tiverton	Tiverton	Newport	Rhode Island		Land-based	Formerly Tiverton Casino
Bally's Twin River Lincoln	Lincoln	Providence	Rhode Island		Land-based	Formerly Twin River Casino
Newport Grand Casino	Newport	Newport	Rhode Island		Land-based	Closed in 2018
Buffalo Bodega Gaming Complex	Deadwood	Lawrence	South Dakota			
Cadillac Jack's Gaming Resort	Deadwood	Lawrence	South Dakota			
Dakota Connection Casino	Sisseton	Roberts	South Dakota		Native American	I-29 Exit 232 (Highway 10)
Dakota Sioux Casino & Hotel	north of Watertown	Codington	South Dakota		Native American	west of I-29 Exit 185
Deadwood Gulch Gaming Resort	Deadwood	Lawrence	South Dakota			
Deadwood Mountain Grand Casino & Hotel	Deadwood	Lawrence	South Dakota			
Deadwood Station Bunkhouse & Gambling Hall	Deadwood	Lawrence	South Dakota			
First Gold Hotel & Gaming	Deadwood	Lawrence	South Dakota			
Fort Randall Casino & Hotel	east of Pickstown	Charles Mix	South Dakota		Native American	on Hwy 46 near Missouri River
Gold Country Inn Gambling Hall & Cafe	Deadwood	Lawrence	South Dakota			
Gold Dust Gaming & Entertainment Complex	Deadwood	Lawrence	South Dakota			
Golden Buffalo Casino & Hotel	Lower Brule	Lyman	South Dakota		Native American	
Grand River Casino & Resort	west of Mobridge	Corson	South Dakota		Native American	US Hwy 12 west of Missouri River
Hickok's Casino	Deadwood	Lawrence	South Dakota			
Historic Bullock Hotel	Deadwood	Lawrence	South Dakota			
Iron Horse Inn	Deadwood	Lawrence	South Dakota			
Lucky 8 Gaming	Deadwood	Lawrence	South Dakota			
Lode Star Casino & Hotel	Fort Thompson	Buffalo	South Dakota		Native American	
The Lodge at Deadwood Gaming Resort	Deadwood	Lawrence	South Dakota			
Main Street Deadwood Gulch	Deadwood	Lawrence	South Dakota			
Mineral Palace Hotel & Gaming	Deadwood	Lawrence	South Dakota			
Mustang Sally's	Deadwood	Lawrence	South Dakota			
Old Style Saloon No. 10 (The Utter Place)	Deadwood	Lawrence	South Dakota			
Oyster Bay Bar & Casino	Deadwood	Lawrence	South Dakota			
Prairie Wind Casino & Hotel	between Oelrichs and Oglala	Oglala Lakota	South Dakota		Native American	on US Hwy 18
Rosebud Casino and Quality Inn Rosebud Casino	south of Mission	Todd	South Dakota		Native American	US 83 north of Valentine, NE
Royal River Casino & Hotel	Flandreau	Moody	South Dakota		Native American	
Silverado Franklin Historic Hotel & Gaming Complex	Deadwood	Lawrence	South Dakota			
Tin Lizzie Gaming Resort	Deadwood	Lawrence	South Dakota			
VFW Casino	Deadwood	Lawrence	South Dakota			
Wooden Nickel Casino	Deadwood	Lawrence	South Dakota			
Kickapoo Lucky Eagle Casino	Eagle Pass	Maverick	Texas		Native American	Owned by the Kickapoo Traditional Tribe of Texas
Naskila Gaming	Livingston	Polk	Texas		Native American	Owned by the Alabama–Coushatta Tribe of Texas
Speaking Rock Entertainment Center	El Paso	El Paso	Texas		Native American	Owned by the Tigua Pueblo; no table games
Caesars Virginia	Danville		Virginia		Land-based	State licensed casino; temporary facility open
Hard Rock Hotel & Casino Bristol	Bristol		Virginia		Land-based	State licensed casino; temporary facility open
HeadWaters Resort & Casino	Norfolk		Virginia		Land-based	State licensed casino; under construction
Rivers Casino Portsmouth	Portsmouth		Virginia		Land-based	State licensed casino
12 Tribes Coulee Dam Casino	Coulee Dam	Okanogan	Washington		Native American	Owned by the Confederated Tribes of the Colville Reservation
12 Tribes Lake Chelan Casino	Manson	Chelan	Washington		Native American	Owned by the Confederated Tribes of the Colville Reservation
12 Tribes Omak Casino Hotel	Omak	Okanogan	Washington		Native American	Owned by the Confederated Tribes of the Colville Reservation
7 Cedars Casino	Sequim	Clallam	Washington		Native American	Owned by the Jamestown S'Klallam Tribe
Angel of the Winds Casino Resort	Arlington	Snohomish	Washington		Native American	Owned by the Stillaguamish Tribe of Indians
BJ's Bingo & Gaming	Fife	Pierce	Washington		Native American	Owned by the Puyallup Tribe of Indians; no table games
Mistequa Casino Hotel	Chewelah	Stevens	Washington		Native American	Owned by the Spokane Tribe of Indians
Elwha River Casino	Port Angeles	Clallam	Washington		Native American	Owned by the Lower Elwha Klallam Tribe
Emerald Queen Hotel & Casino Fife	Fife	Pierce	Washington		Native American	Owned by the Puyallup Tribe of Indians
Emerald Queen Hotel & Casino Tacoma	Tacoma	Pierce	Washington		Native American	Owned by the Puyallup Tribe of Indians
Ilani Casino Resort	La Center	Clark	Washington		Native American	Owned by the Cowlitz Indian Tribe
Legends Casino Hotel	Toppenish	Yakima	Washington		Native American	Owned by the Yakama Indian Reservation
Little Creek Casino and Resort	Shelton	Mason	Washington		Native American	Owned by the Squaxin Island Tribe
Lucky Dog Casino	Potlatch	Mason	Washington		Native American	Owned by the Skokomish Indian Tribe
Lucky Eagle Casino & Hotel	Rochester	Thurston	Washington		Native American	Owned by the Confederated Tribes of the Chehalis Reservation
Muckleshoot Indian Casino	Auburn	King	Washington		Native American	Owned by the Muckleshoot Indian Tribe
Nisqually Red Wind Casino	Yelm	Thurston	Washington		Native American	Owned by the Nisqually Indian Tribe
Nooksack Northwood Casino	Lynden	Whatcom	Washington		Native American	Owned by the Nooksack Indian Tribe
Northern Quest Casino	Airway Heights	Spokane	Washington		Native American	Owned by the Kalispel Tribe of Indians
Quinault Beach Resort and Casino	Ocean Shores	Grays Harbor	Washington		Native American	Owned by the Quinault Indian Nation
Shoalwater Bay Casino	Tokeland	Pacific	Washington		Native American	Owned by the Shoalwater Bay Tribe
Silver Reef Casino Resort	Ferndale	Whatcom	Washington		Native American	Owned by the Lummi Nation
Skagit Casino Resort	Bow	Skagit	Washington		Native American	Owned by the Upper Skagit Indian Tribe; formally Harrah's Skagit Casino
Snoqualmie Casino	Snoqualmie	King	Washington		Native American	Owned by the Snoqualmie Indian Tribe
Spokane Tribe Resort & Casino	Airway Heights	Spokane	Washington		Native American	Owned by the Spokane Tribe of Indians
Suquamish Clearwater Casino Resort	Suqamish	Kitsap	Washington		Native American	Owned by the Suquamish Tribe
Swinomish Northern Lights Casino	Anacortes	Skagit	Washington		Native American	Owned by the Swinomish Indian Tribal Community
The Point Casino	Kingston	Kitsap	Washington		Native American	Owned by the Port Gamble S'Klallam Tribe
Tulalip Resort Casino at Quil Ceda	Marysville	Snohomish	Washington		Native American	Owned by the Tulalip Tribes of Washington
Tulalip Resort Casino	Tulalip	Snohomish	Washington		Native American	Owned by the Tulalip Tribes of Washington
The Casino Club at the Greenbrier	White Sulphur Springs	Greenbrier	West Virginia		Land-based	Limited to the hotel guests
Hollywood Casino at Charles Town Races	Charles Town	Jefferson	West Virginia		Racino	
Mardi Gras Casino and Resort	Nitro	Kanawha	West Virginia		Racino	
Mountaineer Casino, Racetrack and Resort	Chester	Hancock	West Virginia		Racino	
Wheeling Island Hotel-Casino-Racetrack	Wheeling	Ohio	West Virginia		Racino	
Bad River Lodge & Casino	Odanah	Ashland	Wisconsin		Land-based	Owned by the Bad River Band of Chippewa Indians
Grindstone Creek Casino	Hayward	Sawyer	Wisconsin		Land-based	Owned by the Lac Courte Oreilles Tribe; separate part of Sevenwinds Casino
Ho-Chunk Gaming Beloit	Beloit	Rock	Wisconsin		Land-based	Owned by the Ho-Chunk Nation; opening in 2026
Ho-Chunk Gaming Black River Falls	Black River Falls	Jackson	Wisconsin		Land-based	Owned by the Ho-Chunk Nation
Ho-Chunk Gaming Madison	Madison	Dane	Wisconsin		Land-based	Owned by the Ho-Chunk Nation
Ho-Chunk Gaming Nekoosa	Nekoosa	Wood	Wisconsin		Land-based	Owned by the Ho-Chunk Nation
Ho-Chunk Gaming Tomah	Tomah	Monroe	Wisconsin		Land-based	Owned by the Ho-Chunk Nation
Ho-Chunk Gaming Wisconsin Dells	Baraboo	Sauk	Wisconsin		Land-based	Owned by the Ho-Chunk Nation
Ho-Chunk Gaming Wittenberg	Wittenberg	Shawano	Wisconsin		Land-based	Owned by the Ho-Chunk Nation
Lake of the Torches Resort Casino	Lac du Flambeau	Vilas	Wisconsin		Land-based	Owned by the Lac du Flambeau Band of Lake Superior Chippewa
Legendary Waters Resort & Casino	Bayfield	Bayfield	Wisconsin		Land-based	Owned by the Red Cliff Band of Lake Superior Chippewa
Menominee Casino Resort	Keshena	Menominee	Wisconsin		Land-based	Owned by the Menominee Indian Tribe of Wisconsin
Mole Lake Casino & Lodge	Mole Lake	Forest	Wisconsin		Land-based	Owned by the Sokaogon Chippewa Community
North Star Mohican Casino Resort	Bowler	Shawano	Wisconsin		Land-based	Owned by the Stockbridge–Munsee Community
Oneida Casino - Main Airport	Green Bay	Brown	Wisconsin		Land-based	Owned by the Oneida Nation
Oneida Casino - Irene Moore Activity Center	Green Bay	Brown	Wisconsin		Land-based	Owned by the Oneida Nation
Oneida Casino - Packerland	Green Bay	Brown	Wisconsin		Land-based	Owned by the Oneida Nation
Oneida Casino - Travel Center	Pulaski	Brown	Wisconsin		Land-based	Owned by the Oneida Nation
Oneida Casino - West Mason Street Casino	Green Bay	Brown	Wisconsin		Land-based	Owned by the Oneida Nation
Potawatomi Hotel & Casino	Milwaukee	Milwaukee	Wisconsin		Land-based	Owned by the Forest County Potawatomi Community
Potawatomi Carter Casino Hotel	Carter	Forest	Wisconsin		Land-based	Owned by the Forest County Potawatomi Community; formerly Potawatomi Northern Lights Bingo and Casino
St. Croix Casino Danbury	Danbury	Burnett	Wisconsin		Land-based	Owned by the St. Croix Chippewa Indians of Wisconsin
St. Croix Casino Hertel	Webster	Burnett	Wisconsin		Land-based	Owned by the St. Croix Chippewa Indians of Wisconsin; formerly Little Turtle Hertel Express
St. Croix Casino Turtle Lake	Turtle Lake	Barron	Wisconsin		Land-based	Owned by the St. Croix Chippewa Indians of Wisconsin
Sevenwinds Casino, Lodge & Convention Center	Hayward	Sawyer	Wisconsin		Land-based	Owned by the Lac Courte Oreilles Tribe; formerly Lac Courte Oreilles Casino, Lodge & Convention Center
Thunderbird Casino	Keshena	Menominee	Wisconsin		Land-based	Owned by the Menominee Indian Tribe of Wisconsin; separate part of Menominee Casino
789 Casino	Riverton	Fremont	Wyoming		Land-based	Owned by the Northern Arapaho Tribe
Little Wind Casino	Ethete	Fremont	Wyoming		Land-based	Owned by the Northern Arapaho Tribe
Shoshone Rose Casino & Hotel	Fort Washakie	Fremont	Wyoming		Land-based	Owned by the Eastern Shoshone Tribe
Wind River Hotel & Casino	Riverton	Fremont	Wyoming		Land-based	Owned by the Northern Arapaho Tribe

=== Organized by territories ===
List of casinos in United States territories
Casino	City	Territory	Area	Type	Comments	Ref.
Tinian Dynasty Hotel & Casino	San Jose	Northern Mariana Islands		Land-based	Closed	
Divi Carina Bay Hotel & Casino	St. Croix	United States Virgin Islands		Land-based		
Casino Atlántico - Hyatt Place Manatí	Manatí	Puerto Rico	SCG metro	Land-based		
Casino Del Sol - Courtyard by Marriott Isla Verde Beach Resort	Carolina	Puerto Rico	SCG metro	Land-based		
Casino Del Mar at La Concha Renaissance	San Juan	Puerto Rico	SCG metro	Land-based		
Casino Doral Resort at Palmas Del Mar	Humacao	Puerto Rico	SCG metro	Land-based		
Casino Metro at Sheraton Puerto Rico Hotel & Casino	San Juan	Puerto Rico	SCG metro	Land-based Convention center		
Casino Real at Four Points by Sheraton	Caguas	Puerto Rico	SCG metro	Land-based		
Costa Bahia Hotel & Convention Center	Guayanilla	Puerto Rico	Yauco msa	Land-based		
El San Juan Resort & Casino, A Hilton Hotel	Carolina	Puerto Rico	SCG metro	Land-based		
El Tropical Casino at Hyatt Place Bayamón	San Juan	Puerto Rico	SCG metro	Land-based		
Embassy Suites Dorado del Mar	Dorado	Puerto Rico	SCG metro	Land-based		
Holiday Inn Mayagüez & Tropical Casino	Mayagüez	Puerto Rico	Mayagüez metro	Land-based		
Holiday Inn Ponce & El Tropical Casino	Ponce	Puerto Rico	Ponce metro	Land-based		
Hyatt Dorado Beach Resort & Casino Country Club	Dorado	Puerto Rico	SCG metro	Land-based		
Oasis Casino at Embassy Suites Hotel & Casino	Carolina	Puerto Rico	SCG metro	Land-based		
Ocean Casino at Courtyard by Marriott Aguadilla	Aguadilla	Puerto Rico	Aguadilla msa	Land-based		
Mayagüez Resort & Casino	Mayagüez	Puerto Rico	Mayagüez metro	Land-based		
Ponce Hilton & Casino	Ponce	Puerto Rico	Ponce metro	Land-based		
Ponce Plaza Hotel & Casino	Ponce	Puerto Rico	Ponce metro	Land-based		
Ritz-Carlton San Juan Hotel & Casino	Carolina	Puerto Rico	SCG metro	Land-based		
San Juan Marriott Resort & Stellaris Casino	San Juan	Puerto Rico	SCG metro	Land-based		
Wyndham Rio Mar Beach Resort, Country Club & Casino	Rio Grande	Puerto Rico	SCG metro	Land-based Formerly Westin		

== See also ==
- List of casinos
- List of integrated resorts
- List of casinos in Canada
- List of defunct gambling companies
- List of tourist attractions worldwide
