= List of casinos in Alabama =

Wind Creek Casino sign in Atmore

This is a list of casinos in Alabama.

== List of casinos ==
List of casinos in the U.S. state of Alabama
Casino	City	County	State	District	Type	Comments
Victoryland	Shorter	Macon	Alabama		Land-based	Greyhound racing ended in 2011; no table games
Wind Creek Casino & Hotel Atmore	Atmore	Escambia	Alabama		Native American	Owned by the Poarch Band of Creek Indians; no table games
Wind Creek Casino & Hotel Montgomery	Montgomery	Montgomery	Alabama		Native American	Owned by the Poarch Band of Creek Indians; no table games
Wind Creek Casino & Hotel Wetumpka	Wetumpka	Elmore	Alabama		Native American	Owned by the Poarch Band of Creek Indians; no table games

== History ==
=== Legality of electronic bingo ===
Alabama has had many "electronic bingo" parlors which feature slot machines that are similar to Class II gaming machines. The legality of these vary from county to county, and are in a near-constant state of flux. In particular, most such parlors were closed through the efforts of an anti-gambling task force put in place by Gov. Bob Riley early in 2010. But in March 2010, the Alabama Supreme Court determined that Riley did not have the authority to convene such a task force, but that power rested with Attorney General Troy King. Shortly after the task force was sidelined, e-bingo parlors reopened in cities which had previously enacted ordinances permitting and regulating such halls. Additionally, Victoryland also reopened after a brief closure. (Greenetrack and the three Poarch Band of Indians gaming facilities did not close.)

At one time, several counties in Alabama featured numerous electronic bingo halls, most notably Walker County, with halls large and small mostly concentrated along the former U.S. Highway 78 between Jasper and the Jefferson County line, ranging in size from converted small storefronts to large halls with hundreds of machines. But a ruling in a lawsuit by the Walker County sheriff determined that the machines in the county's halls were illegal, and the halls were forced to close. District attorneys in Jefferson County used that ruling to justify their order of closure for halls in that county. However, several large halls in Fairfield remained open because the city had passed specific ordinances permitting them. Those halls closed during the governor's task force raids in January 2010, but reopened on March 12, 2010 when the task force was invalidated. They again closed briefly in April 2010, as a part of the ongoing controversy over their legality and a dispute over jurisdiction between Riley and King.

In late May 2010, in yet another legal action in the anti-gambling feud between Riley and King, the Alabama Supreme Court determined that Riley had the ultimate authority to appoint an anti-gambling task force. Riley then announced plans to reactivate the task force, and the district attorney in the Bessemer Cutoff area of Jefferson County (including Fairfield) advised halls there to shut down immediately, or risk having their machines seized. King announced he would no longer interfere with the governor's efforts. Halls began closures on May 24, 2010. Victoryland and Greenetrack remained open for the time being. Poarch Creek operations were not affected, as the state has no jurisdiction over them.

Fairfield legalized large electronic bingo halls in mid-2009, with certain requirements for minimum number of gaming machines. Bamaco Bingo opened in September 2009 with more than 800 machines installed and announced plans for up to 5,000 machines. All except Bingo Fantastico occupied empty "big box" retail stores; Bingo Fantastico replaced a roller skating rink. Three other small bingo halls, including one that shared space with an automotive repair shop, were also located in Fairfield. The city received a permit fee of $100 per machine per month, and bingo was a major tax source for the city.

Bessemer, Alabama had some e-bingo halls in place, but their legality was in question due to a dispute between the city council, which voted to allow the halls, and the mayor, who opposed gambling. Those halls remained closed after the task force invalidation. Other smaller halls were located in cities and unincorporated areas near Bessemer; they also closed later.

Two other large e-bingo halls, Country Crossing in Dothan and White Hall Gaming Center between Selma and Montgomery, were shut down by the task force.

Throughout the controversy, the Poarch Creek band's operations not only continued, they expanded. Facilities in Wetumpka, Atmore and suburban Montgomery added to their gaming floors, and the Wetumpka and Atmore facilities added new high-rise hotels.

In July 2010, after all legal avenues were exhausted, state police and the task force shut down machines at Greenetrack in Eutaw, Alabama, then later at Victoryland. And on October 4, 2010, federal prosecutors filed charges against and arrested Victoryland owner Milton McGregor and several members of the Alabama State Senate in a corruption investigation regarding the entire affair.

In 2016, after winning a ruling in a federal court against the state, Victoryland reopened its electronic bingo floor on September 14, 2016.

The legal gambling age in Alabama is 21+ for poker, for the Poarch Band of Creek tribal casinos, and for the electronic bingo parlours.

== Gallery ==
Wind Creek Casino & Hotel Atmore

== See also ==
- List of casinos in the United States
- List of casino hotels
