= List of casinos in North Dakota =

This is a list of casinos in North Dakota.

== List of casinos ==
List of casinos in the U.S. state of North Dakota
Casino	City	County	State	District	Type	Comments
Dakota Magic Casino & Hotel	Hankinson	Richland	North Dakota		Native American	Owned by the Sisseton Wahpeton Oyate
Four Bears Casino & Lodge	Four Bears Village	McKenzie	North Dakota		Native American	Owned by the Mandan, Hidatsa, and Arikara Nation
Prairie Knights Casino and Resort	Fort Yates	Sioux	North Dakota		Native American	Owned by the Standing Rock Sioux
Skydancer Casino	Belcourt	Rolette	North Dakota		Native American	Owned by the Turtle Mountain Band of Chippewa Indians
Spirit Lake Casino	Fort Totten	Benson	North Dakota		Native American	Owned by the Spirit Lake Tribe

== List of charitable casinos ==
Permitted by the state, charitable casinos are smaller in scale and proceeds go to a charitable organization.

List of charitable casinos in the U.S. state of North Dakota
Casino	City	County	State	District	Type	Comments
Blue Wolf Casino	Fargo	Cass	North Dakota		Land-based	Sponsored by the Plains Art Museum
King Pin Casino	Fargo	Cass	North Dakota		Land-based	Sponsored by the Plains Art Museum
Lucky Strike Lounge and Casino	Minot	Ward	North Dakota		Land-based	Sponsored by the Minot Junior Golf Association
Playmaker's All-American Lounge	Grand Forks	Grand Forks	North Dakota		Land-based	Sponsored by Prairie Public Broadcasting
Rumors	Grand Forks	Grand Forks	North Dakota		Land-based	Sponsored by Development Homes
Southgate Casino	Grand Forks	Grand Forks	North Dakota		Land-based	Sponsored by the Grand Forks Blue Line Club
Stadium Sports Bar and Casino	Bismarck	Burleigh	North Dakota		Land-based	Sponsored by the Bismarck Convention & Visitors Bureau

== See also ==
- List of casinos in the United States
- List of casino hotels
