= List of casinos in Colorado =

Coordinates: 38.9972°N 105.5478°W

The location of the State of Colorado in the United States of America.

This is a list of casinos in the U.S. State of Colorado.

== List of casinos ==
List of casinos in the U.S. state of Colorado
Casino	City	County	State	District	Type	Comments
Ameristar Black Hawk	Black Hawk	Gilpin	Colorado		Land-based	State licensed casino
Bally's Black Hawk East	Black Hawk	Gilpin	Colorado		Land-based	State licensed casino; formerly Golden Gates Casino
Bally's Black Hawk North ()	Black Hawk	Gilpin	Colorado		Land-based	State licensed casino; formerly Mardi Gras Casino
Bally's Black Hawk West	Black Hawk	Gilpin	Colorado		Land-based	State licensed casino; formerly Golden Gulch Casino
Brass Ass Casino	Cripple Creek	Teller	Colorado		Land-based	State licensed casino
Bronco Billy's Casino	Cripple Creek	Teller	Colorado		Land-based	State licensed casino
Bull Durham Saloon and Casino	Black Hawk	Gilpin	Colorado		Land-based	State licensed casino
Century Casino & Hotel Central City	Central City	Gilpin	Colorado		Land-based	State licensed casino
Century Casino Cripple Creek	Cripple Creek	Teller	Colorado		Land-based	State licensed casino
Colorado Grande Casino	Cripple Creek	Teller	Colorado		Land-based	State licensed casino
Dostal Alley Brewpub & Casino	Central City	Gilpin	Colorado		Land-based	State licensed casino
Double Eagle Hotel & Casino	Cripple Creek	Teller	Colorado		Land-based	State licensed casino
Dragon Tiger Casino	Central City	Gilpin	Colorado		Land-based	State licensed casino
Easy Street Casino	Central City	Gilpin	Colorado		Land-based	State licensed casino
Famous Bonanza	Central City	Gilpin	Colorado		Land-based	State licensed casino
Gilpin Casino	Black Hawk	Gilpin	Colorado		Land-based	State licensed casino
Golden Nugget Cripple Creek	Cripple Creek	Teller	Colorado		Land-based	State licensed casino; formerly Wildwood Hotel & Casino
Grand Z Casino Hotel	Central City	Gilpin	Colorado		Land-based	State licensed casino
Horseshoe Black Hawk	Black Hawk	Gilpin	Colorado		Land-based	State licensed casino; formerly Isle of Capri
Johnny Nolon's Casino	Cripple Creek	Teller	Colorado		Land-based	State licensed casino
Lady Luck Hotel & Casino	Black Hawk	Gilpin	Colorado		Land-based	State licensed casino; formerly Colorado Central Station Casino
Lodge Casino	Black Hawk	Gilpin	Colorado		Land-based	State licensed casino
McGills Hotel & Casino	Cripple Creek	Teller	Colorado		Land-based	State licensed casino
Midnight Rose Hotel & Casino	Cripple Creek	Teller	Colorado		Land-based	State licensed casino
Monarch Casino Resort Spa	Black Hawk	Gilpin	Colorado		Land-based	State licensed casino; formerly Riviera Casino
Red Dolly Casino	Black Hawk	Gilpin	Colorado		Land-based	State licensed casino
Saratoga Casino	Black Hawk	Gilpin	Colorado		Land-based	State licensed casino; formerly Fitzgerald's Casino
Sasquatch Casino	Black Hawk	Gilpin	Colorado		Land-based	State licensed casino
Sky Ute Casino Resort	Ignacio	La Plata	Colorado		Native American	Owned by the Southern Ute Indian Tribe
Ute Mountain Casino Hotel	Towaoc	Montezuma	Colorado		Native American	Owned by the Ute Mountain Ute Tribe
Wild Card Casino & Saloon	Black Hawk	Gilpin	Colorado		Land-based	State licensed casino; first casino in Colorado
Z Casino	Black Hawk	Gilpin	Colorado		Land-based	State licensed casino; formerly Bullwhacker's Casino

== Gallery ==
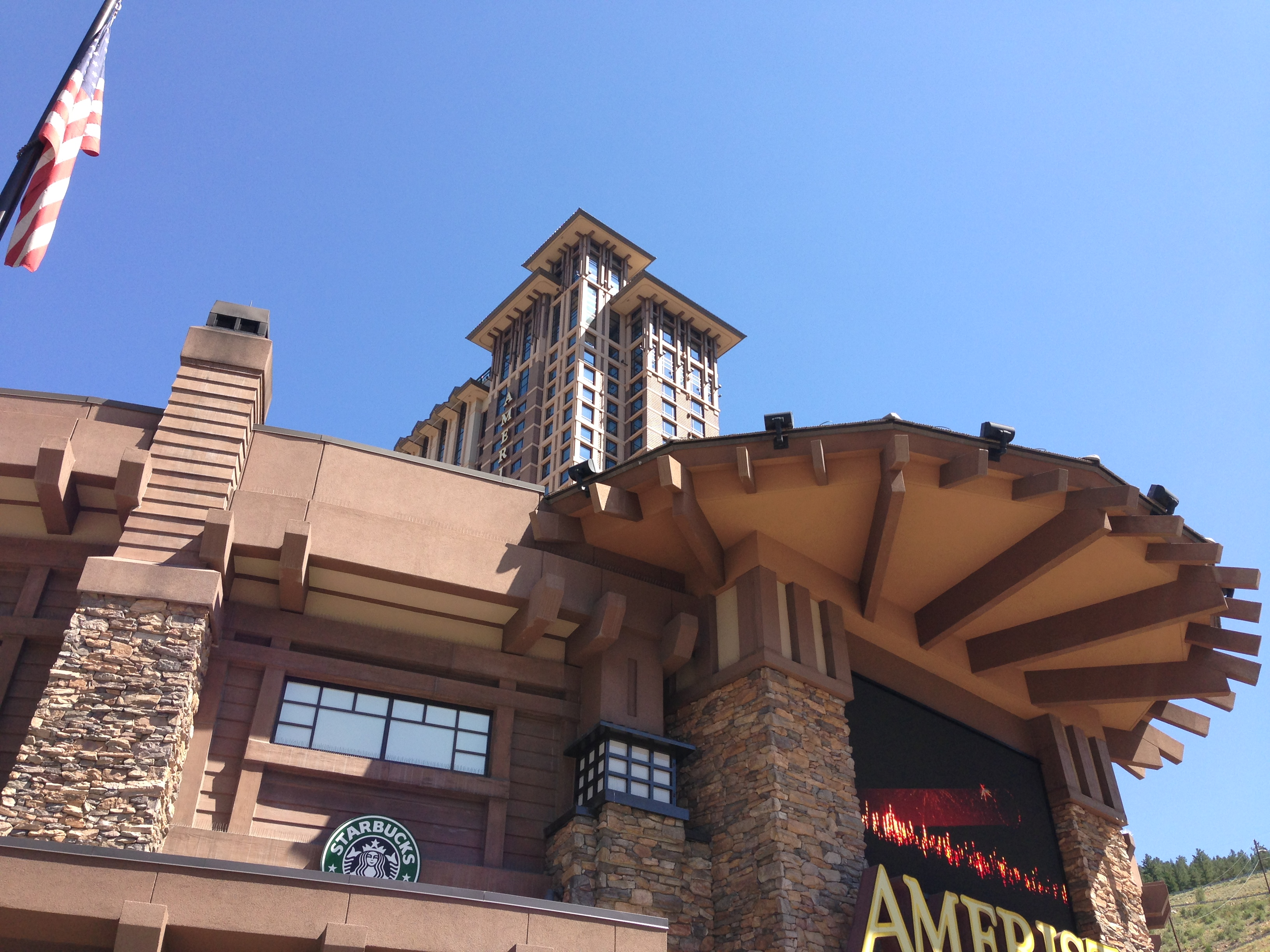
Ameristar Casino, Black Hawk

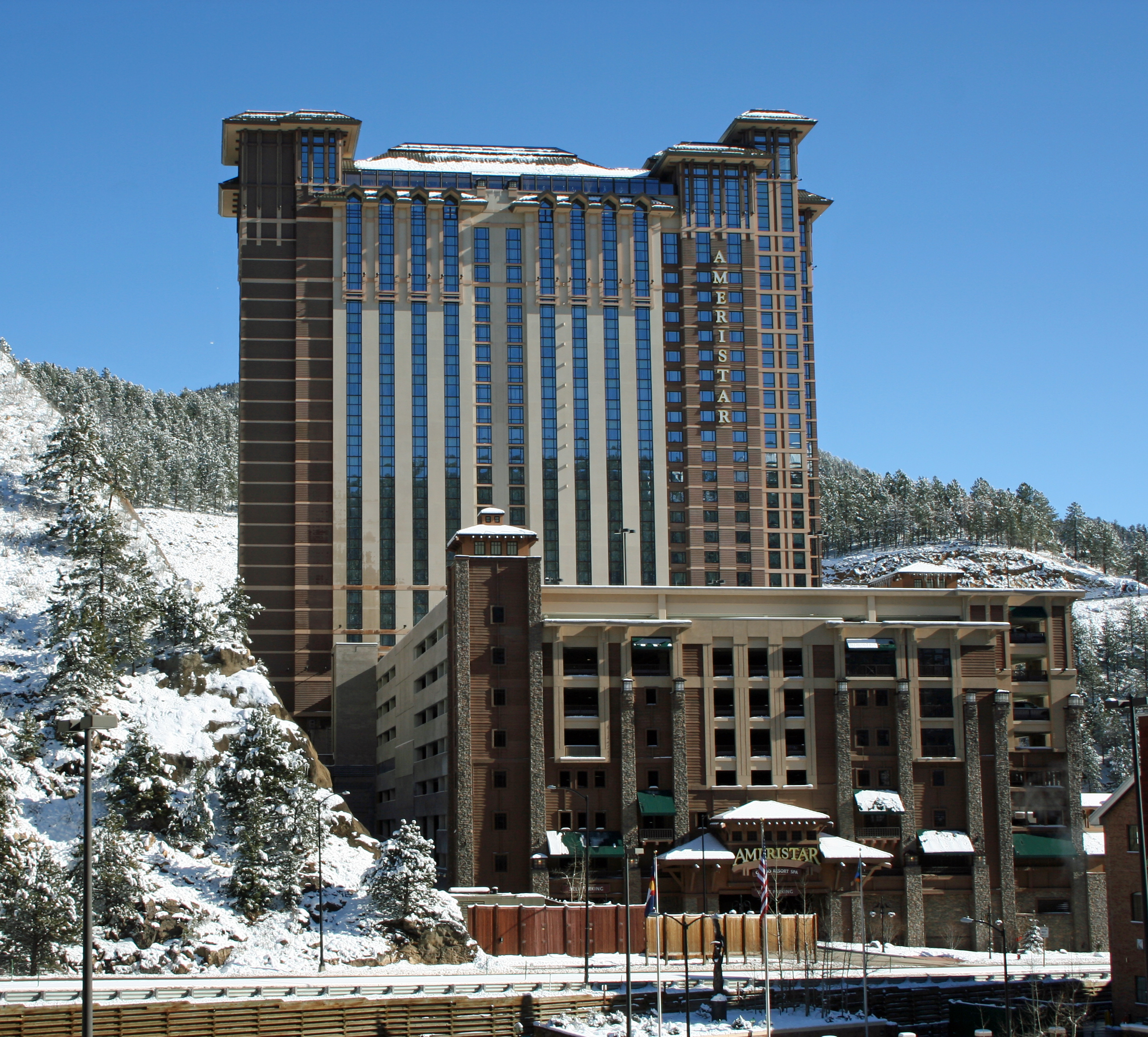
Ameristar Casino Black Hawk

== See also ==
- List of casinos in the United States
- List of casino hotels
- Bibliography of Colorado
- Geography of Colorado
- History of Colorado
- Index of Colorado-related articles
- List of Colorado-related lists
- Outline of Colorado
