= List of casinos in Wyoming =

This is a list of casinos in Wyoming.

== List of casinos ==
List of casinos in the U.S. state of Wyoming
Casino	City	County	State	District	Type	Comments
789 Casino	Riverton	Fremont	Wyoming		Land-based	Owned by the Northern Arapaho Tribe
Little Wind Casino	Ethete	Fremont	Wyoming		Land-based	Owned by the Northern Arapaho Tribe
Shoshone Rose Casino & Hotel	Fort Washakie	Fremont	Wyoming		Land-based	Owned by the Eastern Shoshone Tribe
Wind River Hotel & Casino	Riverton	Fremont	Wyoming		Land-based	Owned by the Northern Arapaho Tribe

== See also ==
- List of casinos in the United States
- List of casino hotels
