= List of casinos in Arkansas =

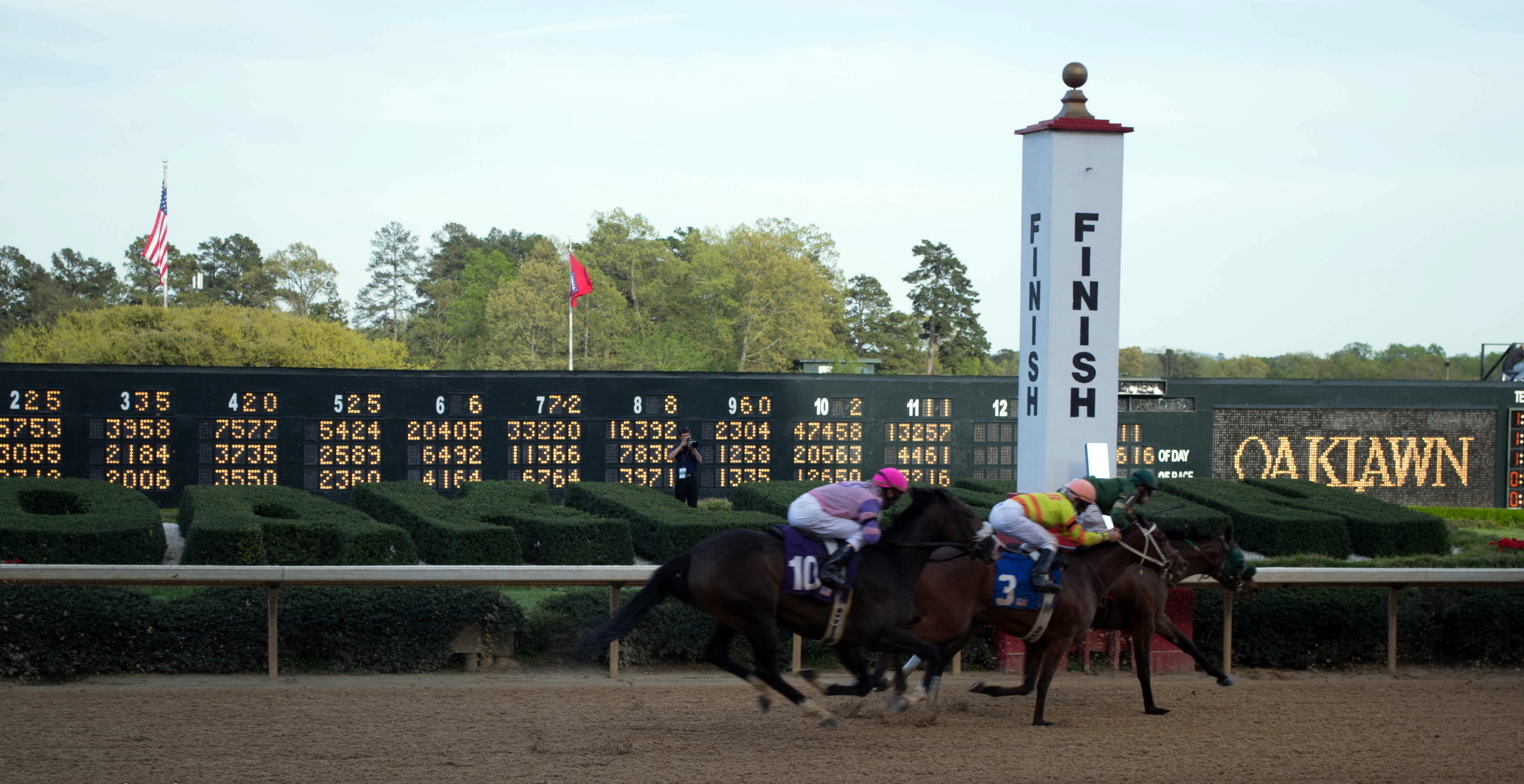
Arkansas Derby 2013 002

This is a list of casinos in Arkansas.

== List of casinos ==
List of casinos in the U.S. state of Arkansas
| Casino | City | County | State | District | Type | Comments |
|---|---|---|---|---|---|---|
| Oaklawn Racing Casino Resort | Hot Springs | Garland | Arkansas | | Racino | Thoroughbred race track |
| Saracen Casino Resort | Pine Bluff | Jefferson | Arkansas | | Land-based | Owned by the Quapaw |
| Southland Casino | West Memphis | Crittenden | Arkansas | | Land-based | Ended greyhound races in 2022 |

== Gallery ==
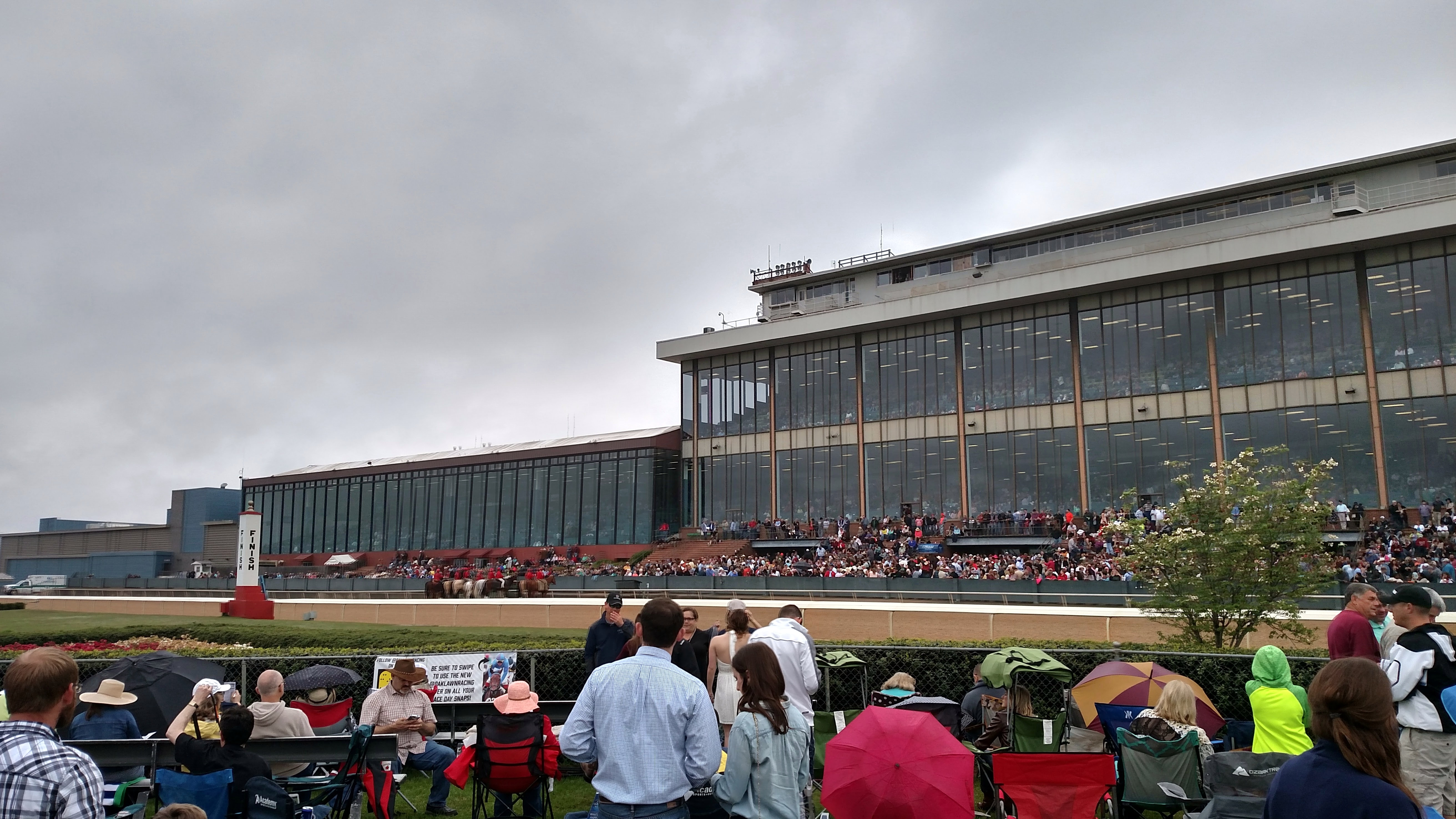

== See also ==
- List of casinos in the United States
- List of casino hotels
