= List of casinos in the United States Virgin Islands =

This is a list of casinos in the United States Virgin Islands.

== List of casinos ==
List of casinos in the United States Virgin Islands
Casino	City	County	State	District	Type	Comments
Divi Carina Bay Hotel & Casino	St. Croix		United States Virgin Islands

== See also ==
- List of casinos in the United States
- Tourism in the United States Virgin Islands
