= Victoryland =

Casino and hotel in Alabama

VictoryLand
- Location: Shorter, Alabama; 8680 County Road 40
- Opened: 1983
- Theme: Where you can be a Winner Too!
- No. of rooms: 300 (closed)
- Notable restaurants: Oasis Buffet (closed)
- Casino type: Land-Based
- Owner: Milton McGregor
- Renovated in: 2009
- Website: victoryland.com

VictoryLand is a casino and hotel in Shorter, Alabama.

== Facilities ==
=== Greyhound racing track ===
The 1,230-foot greyhound racing track operated for 27 years but live racing came to an end in 2011. Victoryland still offers simulcasts and wagering for both greyhound and thoroughbred races elsewhere.

=== Quincy's 777 casino ===
VictoryLand is home to Quincy's 777, a casino, and currently has around 7,000 different slot machines. Before its closure, Quincy's 777 was the largest electronic bingo casino in the state.

=== Oasis Hotel ===
The Oasis Hotel, was a 300-room hotel which was built on the VictoryLand property, and opened on November 1, 2009. It was closed on August 12, 2010 and has not reopened since that time. The hotel had a fine-dining restaurant called Whitfield's Steakhouse, O's Lobby Bar, and the O Brew cafe'.

== History ==
On August 12, 2010, VictoryLand closed its casino, restaurant and hotel operations. Victoryland casino's restaurant remained operational, but hotel operations were closed. The casino is fully operational as of 2022.

On October 4, 2010, VictoryLand owner Milton McGregor was arrested along with 10 state senators and lobbyists after a federal probe relating to the improprieties of state gambling legislation. McGregor was charged with one count of conspiracy, 6 counts of bribery and 11 counts of honest services fraud. He was acquitted on all counts in March 2012. The casino floor was reopened in December 2012, over the objection of Attorney General Luther Strange, who argued that VictoryLand's electronic bingo machines were illegal slot machines.

On June 25, 2015, Judge William Shashy dismissed the civil forfeiture case against Victoryland brought after the Attorney General Luther Strange's office executed a search warrant in 2013 seizing $263,106 in cash and 1,615 gaming machines. Judge Shashy said "The state could not and did not offer any substantive reason why it permitted this state of affairs to continue at other facilities, while taking its present stance against the same operations at Victoryland…The propriety of the State of Alabama electing to currently pursue action against only one facility is of great concern. It is apparent at the present time that the State of Alabama is cherrypicking which facilities should remain open or closed. This Court refuses to be used an instrument to perpetuate unfair treatment," This gave Victoryland the right to re-open with full operations able to resume.

VictoryLand reopened September 14, 2016 with 502 electronic bingo gaming machines on the casino floor. In September 2022, the Alabama Supreme Court issued a ruling in the case of State of Alabama vs Epic Tech LLC in which the court concluded that the electronic bingo gaming at Victoryland and two other casinos in the state constituted illegal gambling enterprises . The court granted the State of Alabama’s request to prohibit the casinos from continuing to offer so-called “electronic bingo” – a misnomer used by the casinos to mean “video-slot-machine gambling” – at their respective facilities. In early 2023, Victoryland replaced all of its electronic bingo machines with historical horse racing machines which were interpreted as being legal under existing Alabama law.
