= Prairie Knights Casino and Resort =

Tribe-owned casino in North Dakota, U.S.

- Interactive map of Prairie Knights Casino and Resort
- Location: Standing Rock Sioux Reservation, North Dakota, U.S.; 46°16′26″N 100°38′13″W
- Signature attractions: Hotel; Concert pavilion
- Website: Official website

Prairie Knights Casino and Resort is a casino and lodge located near Fort Yates, North Dakota, on the Standing Rock Sioux Reservation and about 50 miles (80 km) south of Bismarck-Mandan. It is operated by the Standing Rock Sioux Tribe. The casino offers high stakes gaming options, along with 725 slot machines, blackjack, craps, among other games. The lodge portion of the casino consists of 200 guest rooms. Prairie Knights is also home to an entertainment pavilion that sees about 15 music concerts every year.
