= List of casinos in Nevada =

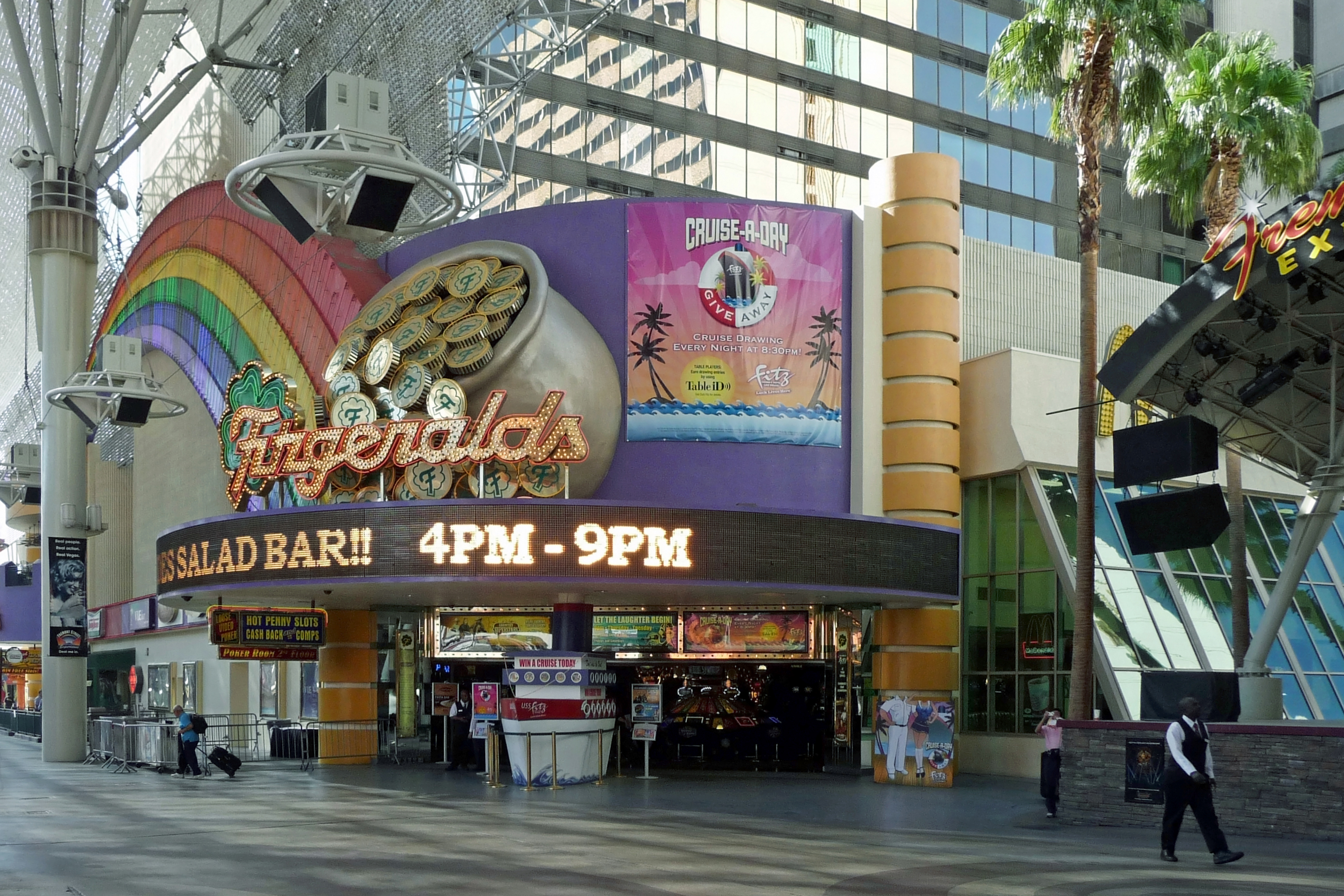
Former Fitzgeralds Casino and Hotel—at the Fremont Street Experience on Fremont Street in Downtown Las Vegas, Clark County, Nevada. Now the present site of The D Las Vegas hotel & casino.

The following casinos are located in Nevada.

List of casinos in the U.S. state of Nevada
Casino	City	County	State	District	Type	Comments
Aladdin	Paradise	Clark	Nevada	Las Vegas		Defunct; closed 1997. Demolished in 1998. Now the site of Planet Hollywood.
Aliante Casino and Hotel	North Las Vegas	Clark	Nevada	North Las Vegas		Previously Aliante Station
Aquarius	Laughlin	Clark	Nevada	Laughlin		Formerly known as Flamingo Hilton Laughlin and Flamingo Laughlin
Aria Resort and Casino	Paradise	Clark	Nevada	Las Vegas Strip
Arizona Charlie's Boulder	Paradise	Clark	Nevada	Boulder Strip		Formerly the Sunrise (which never opened)
Arizona Charlie's Decatur	Paradise	Clark	Nevada	Balance of Clark County
Atlantis	Reno	Washoe	Nevada	Reno
Avi	Laughlin	Clark	Nevada	Laughlin
Aztec Inn	Las Vegas	Clark	Nevada	Las Vegas Strip
Baldini's Sports Casino	Sparks	Washoe	Nevada	Sparks
Bally's Lake Tahoe	Stateline	Douglas	Nevada	South Lake Tahoe		Formerly known as Park Tahoe, Caesars Tahoe, and MontBleu
Barley's	Henderson	Clark	Nevada	Boulder Strip
Barton's Club 93	Jackpot	Elko	Nevada	Balance of Elko County
Bellagio	Paradise	Clark	Nevada	Las Vegas Strip		Formerly the Dunes
Bighorn Casino	North Las Vegas	Clark	Nevada	North Las Vegas
Bill's Casino Lake Tahoe	Stateline	Douglas	Nevada	South Lake Tahoe		Formerly Barney's Casino and the Tahoe Plaza Casino; Defunct; closed January 4, 2010
Binion's Gambling Hall and Hotel	Las Vegas	Clark	Nevada	Las Vegas Downtown		Formerly Binion's Horseshoe
Boardwalk	Paradise	Clark	Nevada	Las Vegas Strip		Defunct; closed 9 January 2006. Demolished May 2006. Now the Waldorf Astoria Las Vegas.
Bodines Casino	Carson City		Nevada	Carson Valley Area
Bonanza Casino	Fallon	Churchill	Nevada	Williams Ave
Bonanza Casino	Reno	Washoe	Nevada	Reno
Boomtown Reno	Verdi	Washoe	Nevada	Balance of Washoe County
Boulder Station	Sunrise Manor	Clark	Nevada	Boulder Strip
Bourbon Square Casino	Sparks	Washoe	Nevada	Sparks		Formerly Silver Club; defunct; closed February 2015. Demolished 2018. Now the site of Nugget Event Center.
Bourbon Street Hotel and Casino	Paradise	Clark	Nevada	Las Vegas Strip		Defunct; closed 18 October 2005. Demolished 14 February 2006 and became an employee parking lot for The Cromwell (now The Vanderpump).
Buffalo Bill's	Primm	Clark	Nevada	Balance of Clark County		Defunct; scaled back operations starting July 2025. Closed altogether on 4 July 2026.
Buffalo Club Casino	Sparks	Washoe	Nevada	Sparks
Cactus Jack's Senator Club	Carson City		Nevada	Carson Valley Area
Cactus Pete's	Jackpot	Elko	Nevada	Balance of Elko County
Caesars Palace	Paradise	Clark	Nevada	Las Vegas Strip
California Club	Las Vegas	Clark	Nevada	Las Vegas Downtown		Defunct; closed 1973. Now part of Golden Nugget.
California Hotel and Casino	Las Vegas	Clark	Nevada	Las Vegas Downtown
Cal Neva Lodge & Casino	Crystal Bay	Washoe	Nevada	South Lake Tahoe		Closed for renovations 2013, purchased out of bankruptcy 2018. Sold to Denver-based McWhinney in 2023 with plans to convert it to a luxury hotel.
Cannery Casino and Hotel	North Las Vegas	Clark	Nevada	North Las Vegas
Carson Nugget	Carson City		Nevada	Carson Valley Area
Carson Valley Inn	Minden	Douglas	Nevada	Carson Valley Area
CasaBlanca	Mesquite	Clark	Nevada	Mesquite		Formerly Players Island
Casino Fandango	Carson City		Nevada	Carson Valley Area		Carson Gaming
Casino Monte Lago	Henderson	Clark	Nevada	Boulder Strip		Defunct; closed 2013
Casino Royale	Paradise	Clark	Nevada	Las Vegas Strip
Casino West	Yerington	Lyon	Nevada	Balance of State
Castaways	Las Vegas	Clark	Nevada	Las Vegas Strip		Defunct; closed 1987. Became the site of The Mirage (now Hard Rock Las Vegas).
Castaways Hotel and Casino	Las Vegas	Clark	Nevada	Boulder Strip		Formerly the Showboat; defunct; closed 29 January 2004. Demolished in 2006 for a new resort, Castaways Station, but construction never began. An apartment complex, storage facility and health district building now sit on much of the site and a Wildfire casino sits on the remainder.
Churchill Station	Fallon	Churchill	Nevada	Williams Ave
Circa Resort & Casino	Las Vegas	Clark	Nevada	Las Vegas Downtown
Circus Circus Las Vegas	Winchester	Clark	Nevada	Las Vegas Strip
Circus Circus Reno	Reno	Washoe	Nevada	Reno
Clarion Hotel and Casino	Paradise	Clark	Nevada	Las Vegas Strip		Defunct; closed 2014 and imploded in 2015. A non-gaming hotel, Majestic Las Vegas, is planned to be built on the site with opening planned for 2027.
Club Cal Neva	Reno	Washoe	Nevada	Reno
Colorado Belle Hotel & Casino	Laughlin	Clark	Nevada	Laughlin		Closed since 2020 due to the COVID-19 pandemic.
Colt Casino	Battle Mountain	Lander	Nevada	Balance of State
Commercial Casino	Elko	Elko	Nevada	Balance of Elko County		Defunct; closed
Comstock Hotel & Casino	Reno	Washoe	Nevada	Reno		Defunct; became a residential hotel in 2006.
Cosmopolitan of Las Vegas	Paradise	Clark	Nevada	Las Vegas Strip
Cotton Club	West Las Vegas	Clark	Nevada	Balance of Clark County		Defunct; closed 1957
C Punch Inn & Casino	Lovelock	Pershing	Nevada	Balance of State
Crystal Bay Club Casino	Crystal Bay	Washoe	Nevada	South Lake Tahoe
Delta Saloon & Casino	Virginia City	Storey	Nevada	Balance of State
Depot Casino	Fallon	Churchill	Nevada	Main St
Desert Inn	Paradise	Clark	Nevada	Las Vegas Strip		Defunct; closed 2000. Demolished by 2004. Now the site of the Wynn Las Vegas and Encore Las Vegas.
Diamond Casino	Reno	Washoe	Nevada	Reno
Dini's Lucky Club	Yerington	Lyon	Nevada	Balance of State
Downtown Grand	Las Vegas	Clark	Nevada	Las Vegas Downtown		Formerly Lady Luck Hotel & Casino
Dunes	Paradise	Clark	Nevada	Las Vegas Strip		Defunct; closed and demolished 1993. Now the site of the Bellagio.
Eastside Cannery	Sunrise Manor	Clark	Nevada	Boulder Strip		Defunct; built on former site of Nevada Palace. Closed in 2020 due to the COVID-19 pandemic and never reopened. Boyd Gaming announced in October 2025 that the casino would be demolished due to a lack of customer demand. Imploded in March 2026; the site is planned to be sold for residential development.
Edgewater Hotel and Casino	Laughlin	Clark	Nevada	Laughlin
El Capitan Hotel & Casino	Hawthorne	Mineral	Nevada	Balance of State
El Cortez	Las Vegas	Clark	Nevada	Las Vegas Downtown
El Morocco	West Las Vegas	Clark	Nevada	Balance of Clark County		Defunct; closed 1958. Rebuilt in 1959 as the New El Morocco, closed in 1960, reopened in 1963 and closed for good in 1964.
El Rancho Vegas	Las Vegas	Clark	Nevada	Las Vegas Strip		Defunct; burned down on 17 June 1960. Operated as the El Rancho Vegas Motor Inn in the late 1960s. The Hilton Grand Vacations Club now sits on the southern portion of the site and the Las Vegas Festival Grounds on the remainder.
El Rancho Hotel and Casino	Las Vegas	Clark	Nevada	Las Vegas Strip		Defunct; closed 1992. Demolished in 2000. Now the site of Fontainebleau Las Vegas.
Eldorado Resort Casino	Reno	Washoe	Nevada	Reno
Ellis Island Casino & Brewery	Paradise	Clark	Nevada	Las Vegas Strip
Encore	Paradise	Clark	Nevada	Las Vegas Strip
Eureka	Mesquite	Clark	Nevada	Mesquite
Excalibur	Paradise	Clark	Nevada	Las Vegas Strip
Fiesta Henderson	Henderson	Clark	Nevada	Boulder Strip		Defunct; closed 2020 due to the COVID-19 pandemic and never reopened. Demolished in 2022 except for the parking garage and sold to the City of Henderson; an indoor recreational sports center is planned for the site.
Fiesta Rancho	North Las Vegas	Clark	Nevada	North Las Vegas		Defunct; closed 2020 due to the COVID-19 pandemic and never reopened. Demolished in 2023; a mixed-use community called Hylo Park is planned to be built on the site, including a 150-room hotel, retail space and two new ice rinks; the existing rink would be converted into an indoor stadium.
Fitzgeralds Reno	Reno	Washoe	Nevada	Reno		Defunct; closed 2008, converted to a hotel
Flamingo Las Vegas	Paradise	Clark	Nevada	Las Vegas Strip		Formerly known as Flamingo Hilton Las Vegas
Fontainebleau Las Vegas	Las Vegas	Clark	Nevada	Las Vegas Strip		Formerly Algiers and El Rancho; was The Drew Las Vegas from 2018 to 2021
Four Jacks Hotel & Casino	Jackpot	Elko	Nevada	Balance of Elko County
Four Queens	Las Vegas	Clark	Nevada	Las Vegas Downtown
Fremont Hotel and Casino	Las Vegas	Clark	Nevada	Las Vegas Downtown
Gold County Inn & Casino	Elko	Elko	Nevada	Balance of Elko County		Operated by Navegante Group
Gold Coast	Paradise	Clark	Nevada	Las Vegas Strip
Gold Dust West Carson	Carson City		Nevada	Carson Valley Area		Formerly known as Pinon Plaza
Gold Dust West Elko	Elko	Elko	Nevada	Elko
Gold Dust West Reno	Reno	Washoe	Nevada	Reno
Gold Ranch Dayton	Dayton	Lyon	Nevada	Dayton
Gold Ranch Sparks	Sparks	Washoe	Nevada	Sparks
Gold Ranch Verdi	Verdi	Washoe	Nevada	Balance of Washoe County
Gold Rush Casino	Henderson	Clark	Nevada	Boulder Strip
Gold Spike	Las Vegas	Clark	Nevada	Las Vegas Downtown		Casino closed on 14 April 2013, converted to a restaurant/bar and residential building
Golden Gate Casino	Las Vegas	Clark	Nevada	Las Vegas Downtown
Golden Nugget Las Vegas	Las Vegas	Clark	Nevada	Las Vegas Downtown
Golden Nugget Laughlin	Laughlin	Clark	Nevada	Laughlin
Golden Phoenix	Reno	Washoe	Nevada	Reno		Defunct; closed October 2006; formerly known as Sahara Reno, Reno Hilton, Flamingo Hilton Reno and Flamingo Reno; converted into a condominium tower
Grand Lodge Casino at Hyatt Regency Lake Tahoe	Incline Village	Washoe	Nevada	North Lake Tahoe
Grand Sierra Resort	Reno	Washoe	Nevada	Reno		Formerly known as MGM Grand Reno, Bally's Reno and Reno Hilton
Green Valley Ranch	Henderson	Clark	Nevada	Boulder Strip
Hacienda	Paradise	Clark	Nevada	Las Vegas Strip		Defunct; closed 1996. Demolished and now site of Mandalay Bay.
Hard Rock Lake Tahoe	Stateline	Douglas	Nevada	South Lake Tahoe		Formerly known as Sahara Tahoe, High Sierra and Horizon Lake Tahoe
Hard Rock Hotel	Paradise	Clark	Nevada	Las Vegas Strip		Defunct; closed 2020, reopened as Virgin Hotels Las Vegas
Harold's Club	Reno	Washoe	Nevada	Reno		Defunct; closed 1995. Demolished 1999. Now an outdoor plaza.
Harrah's Lake Tahoe	Stateline	Douglas	Nevada	South Lake Tahoe		Formerly the Stateline Country Club and the Nevada Club
Harrah's Las Vegas	Paradise	Clark	Nevada	Las Vegas Strip
Harrah's Laughlin	Laughlin	Clark	Nevada	Laughlin
Harrah's Reno	Reno	Washoe	Nevada	Reno		Defunct; closed 2020 due to the COVID-19 pandemic. Will become a mixed-use development named Reno City Center.
Harveys Lake Tahoe	Stateline	Douglas	Nevada	South Lake Tahoe		Formerly Harvey's Wagon Wheel and Harrah's Club
High Desert Casino	Elko	Elko	Nevada	Balance of Elko County		Operated by Navegante Group
Holy Cow	Las Vegas	Clark	Nevada	Las Vegas Downtown		Defunct; closed 22 March 2002, demolished April 2012. A Walgreens store now stands on the site.
Hoover Dam Lodge	Outside Boulder City limits	Clark	Nevada	Balance of Clark County		On parcel of private land within Lake Mead National Recreation Area; formerly Gold Strike and Hacienda
Horseshoe Hotel & Casino	Elko	Elko	Nevada	Balance of Elko County
Horseshoe Las Vegas	Paradise	Clark	Nevada	Las Vegas Strip		Formerly Bally's
Hotel Nevada and Gambling Hall	Ely	White Pine	Nevada	Balance of State
Indian Springs Casino	Indian Springs	Clark	Nevada	Balance of Clark County
Jail House Motel & Casino	Ely	White Pine	Nevada	Balance of State
Jerry's Nugget	North Las Vegas	Clark	Nevada	North Las Vegas
Jim Kelley's Nugget Casino	Crystal Bay	Washoe	Nevada	South Lake Tahoe
Jokers Wild Casino	Henderson	Clark	Nevada	Boulder Strip		Formerly Cattle Baron Casino
Jolly Trolley Casino	Las Vegas	Clark	Nevada	Las Vegas Strip		Defunct, closed 1981; previously the Big Wheel Casino and Centerfold Casino. Now the Bonanza Gift & Souvenir Shop.
Key Largo	Paradise	Clark	Nevada	Las Vegas Strip		Defunct; closed 2005. Demolished in 2013 following a fire.
Kings Castle Hotel and Casino	Incline Village	Washoe	Nevada	North Lake Tahoe		Defunct; closed 1972
Kings Inn	Reno	Washoe	Nevada	Reno		Defunct; closed 1982 (casino) and 1986 (hotel). Redeveloped into a mixed-use development in 2014.
Klondike Hotel and Casino	Paradise	Clark	Nevada	Las Vegas Strip		Defunct; closed June 2006. Demolished March 2008. Now a Harley-Davidson dealership as of 2014.
Klondike Sunset Casino	Henderson	Clark	Nevada	Boulder Strip
La Bayou	Las Vegas	Clark	Nevada	Las Vegas Downtown		Defunct; closed June 2016. Demolished 2016. Now part of Golden Gate.
Lakeside Inn	Stateline	Douglas	Nevada	South Lake Tahoe		Formerly known as Caesars Inn and Harvey's Inn; Defunct; closed 2020 due to effects of the COVID-19 pandemic. Planned to be demolished and replaced by a healthcare facility.
Landmark	Winchester	Clark	Nevada	Las Vegas Strip		Defunct; closed 1990. Demolished 1995 and became a parking lot for the Las Vegas Convention Center. The LVCC's West Hall expansion now sits on the site.
Las Vegas Club	Las Vegas	Clark	Nevada	Las Vegas Downtown		Defunct; closed 19 August 2015. Demolished and now site of Circa Resort & Casino.
Laughlin River Lodge	Laughlin	Clark	Nevada	Laughlin		Formerly known as Sam's Town Gold River, Gold River and River Palms
Longstreet Hotel, Casino, and RV Resort	Amargosa Valley	Nye	Nevada	Balance of State
Louisiana Club	West Las Vegas	Clark	Nevada	Balance of Clark County		Defunct; closed 20 May 1970
Lucky Club Hotel & Casino	North Las Vegas	Clark	Nevada	North Las Vegas		Formerly known as Speedway Casino
Lucky Dragon	Las Vegas	Clark	Nevada	Las Vegas Strip		Defunct; closed 2018, reopened as Ahern Hotel and Convention Center
Luxor	Paradise	Clark	Nevada	Las Vegas Strip
M Resort	Henderson	Clark	Nevada
Main Street Station Hotel	Las Vegas	Clark	Nevada	Las Vegas Downtown
Mandalay Bay	Paradise	Clark	Nevada	Las Vegas Strip		Former site of Hacienda
Mapes Hotel	Reno	Washoe	Nevada	Reno		Defunct; closed December 1982; demolished January 2000. Now an outdoor skating rink.
Max Casino	Carson City		Nevada	Carson Valley Area
Mermaids Casino	Las Vegas	Clark	Nevada	Las Vegas Downtown		Defunct; closed 27 June 2016. Demolished and now site of Circa Resort & Casino.
Mesquite Star	Mesquite	Clark	Nevada	Mesquite		Defunct; closed March 2000. Now the Rising Star Sports Ranch.
MGM Grand Las Vegas	Paradise	Clark	Nevada	Las Vegas Strip
Mint Casino	Sparks	Washoe	Nevada	Sparks
Model T Casino	Winnemucca	Humboldt	Nevada	Balance of State
Montego Bay Resort	West Wendover	Elko	Nevada	Wendover		Formerly the Silver Smith Casino—operated by Peppermill casino properties
Mountain View Casino	Pahrump	Nye	Nevada	Balance of State
Moulin Rouge	West Las Vegas	Clark	Nevada	Balance of Clark County		Defunct; closed November 1955. Partially demolished 2010 and completely demolished in 2017. First desegregated casino.
Nevada Landing	Jean	Clark	Nevada	Balance of Clark County		Defunct; closed 20 March 2007. Demolished March 2008. Site sold off in 2022 to a developer with plans for a 3 million square foot mega-warehouse complex.
Nevada Palace Hotel & Casino	Sunrise Manor	Clark	Nevada	Boulder Strip		Defunct; closed 29 February 2008. Demolished and now site of Eastside Cannery.
New Frontier	Paradise	Clark	Nevada	Las Vegas Strip		Defunct; closed 16 July 2007. Formerly Pair-O' Dice/91 Club (1931-1942), Hotel Last Frontier (1942-1955) and New Frontier (1955-1965). Demolished November 2007. Still-vacant land owned by Wynn Resorts since early 2018.
New York-New York	Paradise	Clark	Nevada	Las Vegas Strip
Nugget Casino Resort	Sparks	Washoe	Nevada	Sparks		Formerly known as Dick Graves' Nugget and John Ascuaga's Nugget
Oasis	Mesquite	Clark	Nevada	Mesquite		Defunct; closed in 2010. Demolished in 2013.
Opera House	North Las Vegas	Clark	Nevada	North Las Vegas		Defunct; closed in 2014 and later demolished. A Dotty's slot machine parlor now sits on the site.
Ormsby House	Carson City		Nevada	Carson Valley Area		Defunct; closed in 2000 for remodeling. Put up for sale in June 2019, planned to be converted into housing and retail space.
O'Shea's	Winchester	Clark	Nevada	Las Vegas Strip		Original location closed on April 30, 2012. Relocated to The Linq and opened in 2013. The original site is now the Vortex, a multi-story structure marking the entrance to the Linq Promenade.
Owl Club Bar and Restaurant	Eureka	Eureka	Nevada	Balance of State
Owl Club Casino & Restaurant	Battle Mountain	Lander	Nevada	Balance of State
Oyo Hotel & Casino	Paradise	Clark	Nevada	Las Vegas Strip		Formerly Hooters Casino Hotel, Hôtel San Rémo, Paradise Hotel, and Howard Johnson Hotel
Pahrump Nugget Hotel & Gambling Hall	Pahrump	Nye	Nevada	Balance of State
Pahrump Station Hotel & Casino	Pahrump	Nye	Nevada	Balance of State
Palace Station	Las Vegas	Clark	Nevada
Paris Las Vegas	Paradise	Clark	Nevada	Las Vegas Strip
Palms Casino Resort	Paradise	Clark	Nevada	Las Vegas Strip		Temporarily closed from March 2020 due to the COVID-19 pandemic. Sold to San Manuel Band of Mission Indians and reopened in April 2022.
Park MGM	Paradise	Clark	Nevada	Las Vegas Strip		Formerly Monte Carlo
People's Choice Casino	West Las Vegas	Clark	Nevada	Balance of Clark County		Defunct; closed sometime after 1991
Peppermill Reno	Reno	Washoe	Nevada	Reno
Peppermill Wendover	West Wendover	Elko	Nevada	Wendover
Pete's Gambling Hall	Winnemucca	Humboldt	Nevada	Balance of State
Pioneer Club Las Vegas	Las Vegas	Clark	Nevada	Las Vegas Downtown		Defunct; closed 1995. Now a gift shop.
Pioneer Hotel & Gambling Hall	Laughlin	Clark	Nevada	Laughlin
Planet Hollywood Las Vegas	Paradise	Clark	Nevada	Las Vegas Strip		Formerly The Aladdin
Plaza Hotel & Casino	Las Vegas	Clark	Nevada	Las Vegas Downtown
Poker Palace	North Las Vegas	Clark	Nevada	North Las Vegas
Primm Valley Resort	Primm	Clark	Nevada	Balance of Clark County		Closed briefly in July 2026; reopened following its acquisition by Terrible Herbst.
Prospectors Casino	Ely	White Pine	Nevada	Balance of State
Rail City Casino	Sparks	Washoe	Nevada	Sparks		Formerly Plantation Casino
Railroad Pass Hotel & Casino	Henderson	Clark	Nevada	Henderson
Rainbow Casino	West Wendover	Elko	Nevada	Wendover
Ramada/Copper Queen Casino	Ely	White Pine	Nevada	Balance of State
Rampart Casino	Summerlin	Clark	Nevada	Balance of Clark County
Red Garter	West Wendover	Elko	Nevada	Wendover		Operated by Holder Hospitality Group
Red Lion Casino	Elko	Elko	Nevada	Balance of Elko County		Operated by Navegante Group
Red Rock Resort	Summerlin	Clark	Nevada	Balance of Clark County
Regency Casino	Laughlin	Clark	Nevada	Laughlin
Reno Nugget Casino	Reno	Washoe	Nevada	Reno
Resorts World	Winchester	Clark	Nevada	Las Vegas Strip		Formerly Stardust
Roadhouse Casino	Henderson	Clark	Nevada	Boulder Strip
Rio	Paradise	Clark	Nevada	Las Vegas Strip
Riverside Hotel Casino	Reno	Washoe	Nevada	Reno		Defunct; casino closed 1986; hotel closed 1987. Now an apartment building.
Riverside Resort Hotel & Casino	Laughlin	Clark	Nevada	Laughlin
Riviera Hotel and Casino	Winchester	Clark	Nevada	Las Vegas Strip		Defunct; closed May 2016, imploded August 2016. A portion of the land is now part of the Las Vegas Global Business District and the remainder was sold.
Royal Nevada	Winchester	Clark	Nevada	Las Vegas Strip		Defunct; closed 1958 and converted into a convention center for the Stardust. Resorts World Las Vegas now sits on the site.
Saddle West Casino	Pahrump	Nye	Nevada	Balance of State
Sahara Las Vegas	Winchester	Clark	Nevada	Las Vegas Strip		Formerly known as SLS Las Vegas from 2013 to 2019, returned to its original name
Sands Regency	Reno	Washoe	Nevada	Reno
Sam's Town Hotel and Gambling Hall	Sunrise Manor	Clark	Nevada	Boulder Strip
Santa Fe Station	North Las Vegas	Clark	Nevada	North Las Vegas
Say When Casino	McDermitt	Humboldt	Nevada	Balance of State
Scoreboard Sports Lounge	Spring Creek	Elko	Nevada	Balance of Elko County
Searchlight Nugget Casino	Searchlight	Clark	Nevada
Sharkeys Casino	Gardnerville	Douglas	Nevada	Carson Valley Area
Sierra Sid's 76	Sparks	Washoe	Nevada	Sparks
Silver City Casino	Winchester	Clark	Nevada	Las Vegas Strip		Defunct; closed 1999. Demolished in 2004. Now the site of Silver City Plaza. A marquee from the old casino is still standing on Convention Center Drive.
Silver Legacy Reno	Reno	Washoe	Nevada	Reno
Silver Nugget	North Las Vegas	Clark	Nevada	North Las Vegas
Silver Sevens	Paradise	Clark	Nevada	Las Vegas Strip
Silver Slipper	Paradise	Clark	Nevada	Las Vegas Strip		Defunct; closed 1988. Demolished in 1989 and became a parking lot for the Frontier.
Silverton	Enterprise	Clark	Nevada	Balance of Clark County		Formerly Boomtown Blue Diamond and Boomtown Las Vegas
Siena Reno	Reno	Washoe	Nevada	Reno		Defunct; casino closed in 2015 and remodeled into a non-casino hotel. Formerly Holiday Reno and Siena Reno.
Slots-A-Fun Casino	Winchester	Clark	Nevada	Las Vegas Strip
Skyline Casino	Henderson	Clark	Nevada
South Point	Enterprise	Clark	Nevada	Las Vegas Strip
Stagedoor Casino	Paradise	Clark	Nevada
Stagestop Casino	Pahrump	Nye	Nevada	Balance of State
Stagecoach Hotel & Casino	Beatty	Nye	Nevada	Balance of State
Stardust	Winchester	Clark	Nevada	Las Vegas Strip		Defunct; closed 2006. Imploded in 2007. Now the site of Resorts World Las Vegas.
Stateline Casino	West Wendover	Elko	Nevada	Wendover		Defunct; closed 2004. Renamed Wendover Nugget Hotel and Casino.
Stateline Casino and Motel	Mesquite	Clark	Nevada	Mesquite
Stockmen's Casino & Hotel	Elko	Elko	Nevada	Balance of Elko County
Stockman's Casino	Fallon	Churchill	Nevada	Williams Ave
Suncoast	Las Vegas	Clark	Nevada	Balance of Clark County
Sundance Casino	Winnemucca	Humboldt	Nevada	Balance of State
Sunset Station	Henderson	Clark	Nevada	Boulder Strip
Tamarack Junction	Reno	Washoe	Nevada	Reno
Tahoe Biltmore	Crystal Bay	Washoe	Nevada	South Lake Tahoe
Terrible's Casino Searchlight	Searchlight	Clark	Nevada	Balance of Clark County
Terrible's Hotel & Casino	Jean	Clark	Nevada	Balance of Clark County		Defunct; closed 2020. Partially demolished in 2024; planned to be replaced by an industrial park. Formerly known as Gold Strike
Terrible's Town Henderson	Henderson	Clark	Nevada	Boulder Strip		Defunct; closed 2013
Terrible's Town Pahrump	Pahrump	Nye	Nevada	Balance of State
Terrible's Lakeside	Pahrump	Nye	Nevada	Balance of State
Texas Station	North Las Vegas	Clark	Nevada	North Las Vegas		Defunct; closed in 2020 due to the COVID-19 pandemic and never reopened. Demolished 2022-2023; a mixed-use community called Hylo Park is planned to be built on the site, with houses and retail space.
The Alamo Casino	Sparks	Washoe	Nevada	Sparks
The D Las Vegas	Las Vegas	Clark	Nevada	Las Vegas Downtown		Formerly known as Sundance Las Vegas and Fitzgeralds Las Vegas, renamed in 2012
The Linq	Paradise	Clark	Nevada	Las Vegas Strip		Formerly Imperial Palace and The Quad
The Meadows Casino & Hotel	Las Vegas	Clark	Nevada	Balance of Clark County		Defunct; closed 1942. Later demolished after it caught fire. First resort hotel-casino in Las Vegas.
The Mint	Las Vegas	Clark	Nevada	Las Vegas Downtown		Defunct; closed 1988. Now part of Binion's Horseshoe.
The Mirage	Paradise	Clark	Nevada	Las Vegas Strip		Formerly Castaways. Defunct; closed July 2024. Will be rebranded as Hard Rock Las Vegas with reopening planned for 2027.
The Orleans	Paradise	Clark	Nevada	Balance of Clark County
The Nevada Casino & Bar	Battle Mountain	Lander	Nevada	Balance of State
The Palazzo	Paradise	Clark	Nevada	Las Vegas Strip
The Pass	Henderson	Clark	Nevada	Boulder Strip		Formerly Wheel Casino and Eldorado Casino
The Pony Express Casino	Elko	Elko	Nevada	Balance of Elko County
The Sands	Paradise	Clark	Nevada	Las Vegas Strip		Defunct; closed 1996. Now the site of The Venetian.
The Station House	Tonopah	Nye	Nevada	Balance of State
The Strat	Las Vegas	Clark	Nevada	Las Vegas Strip		Formerly Stratosphere
The Vanderpump	Paradise	Clark	Nevada	Las Vegas Strip		Formerly Barbary Coast, Bill's Gamblin' Hall and Saloon and The Cromwell
The Venetian	Paradise	Clark	Nevada	Las Vegas Strip		Formerly the Sands
The Western	Las Vegas	Clark	Nevada	Las Vegas Downtown		Defunct; closed January 2012. The hotel portion was demolished in 2013 while the casino portion remains standing.
Tonopah Station	Tonopah	Nye	Nevada	Balance of State
Topaz Lodge	Topaz Lake	Douglas	Nevada	Carson Valley Area
Town Tavern	West Las Vegas	Clark	Nevada	Balance of Clark County		Defunct; closed 2013. Was Town Tavern from 1955 to 1959, then "New" Town Tavern from then until the 1990s, after which it became "Ultra New" Town Tavern. The sign was changed to "Tokyo Casino" in 2016, but the club never reopened under this name. Burned down in October 2023.
Treasure Island	Paradise	Clark	Nevada	Las Vegas Strip
Tropicana Las Vegas	Paradise	Clark	Nevada	Las Vegas Strip		Defunct; closed April 2024. Demolished by October 2024 to make way for the New Las Vegas Stadium.
Tropicana Laughlin	Laughlin	Clark	Nevada	Laughlin		Formerly Ramada Express and Tropicana Express
Tuscany Suites and Casino	Paradise	Clark	Nevada	Las Vegas Strip
Vacation Village	Enterprise	Clark	Nevada			Defunct; closed January 2002. Demolished in 2004. The southeastern portion of Town Square now sits on the site.
Vegas World	Las Vegas	Clark	Nevada	Las Vegas Strip		Defunct; closed 1995. Remodeled and integrated into Stratosphere.
Virgin River Casino	Mesquite	Clark	Nevada	Mesquite
Virgin Hotels Las Vegas	Paradise	Clark	Nevada	Paradise		Formerly the Hard Rock Hotel
Wendover Nugget	West Wendover	Elko	Nevada	Wendover		Formerly the Stateline Casino
Western Village	Sparks	Washoe	Nevada	Sparks
Westgate Las Vegas Resort & Casino	Winchester	Clark	Nevada	Las Vegas Strip		Formerly the International Hotel, Las Vegas Hilton and LVH
Westin Las Vegas	Paradise	Clark	Nevada	Las Vegas Strip		Defunct; casino closed July 2017 and converted to a hotel. Formerly the Maxim and Westin Causarina Las Vegas Hotel
Westward Ho	Winchester	Clark	Nevada	Las Vegas Strip		Defunct; closed 17 November 2005. Demolished in 2006. A McDonald's now sits on a portion of the site.
Wildfire Casino		Clark	Nevada	Balance of Clark County
Wild Wild West	Paradise	Clark	Nevada			Defunct; closed 7 September 2022 and planned to be demolished for future development. In April 2023, Station Casinos agreed to sell 49 acres of the site to the Oakland Athletics for development of their new ballpark, but this was changed to the Tropicana Las Vegas a month later.
Winnemucca Inn & Casino	Winnemucca	Humboldt	Nevada	Balance of State		Formerly the Red Lion Hotel & Casino (until 2008/2009)
Winners Inn Casino	Winnemucca	Humboldt	Nevada	Balance of State
Whiskey Pete's	Primm	Clark	Nevada	Balance of Clark County		Defunct closed 20 December 2024.
Wynn Las Vegas	Paradise	Clark	Nevada	Las Vegas Strip		Formerly the Desert Inn

== See also ==
- Las Vegas Strip
- List of casino hotels
- List of casinos in the United States
- List of Las Vegas casinos that never opened

== Notes ==
=== Sources ===
- "Abbreviated Revenue Release Index". Nevada Gaming Control Board. Archived from the original on August 20, 2008.
