= Sarann Knight-Preddy =

American casino owner (1920–2014)

- Born: July 22, 1920; Eufaula, Oklahoma
- Died: December 22, 2014 (aged 94); Las Vegas, Nevada
- Occupations: business leader and gaming pioneer

Sarann Knight-Preddy (July 27, 1920 – December 22, 2014) was an American business leader and gaming pioneer in the U.S. state of Nevada. In 1950, she became the "first and only woman of color to receive a gaming license" in the state. She was the co-founder of a node of the Democratic Club in Las Vegas.

== Early life ==
Born in Eufaula, Oklahoma, to mixed-race parents, Preddy married just out of high school and moved with her family to Las Vegas. At the time she arrived there were few work opportunities for blacks, but Preddy learned to write keno and deal blackjack. Following her second husband to Hawthorne, Nevada, where he worked at the ammunition depot, Preddy had the opportunity to purchase a bar. She bought it and licensed it, becoming the first woman of color to have a gaming license.

== Career ==
After seven years, Preddy returned to Las Vegas and worked in various "after hours" clubs in West Las Vegas, until a city ordinance was passed which banned black dealers. She tried her hand at running a dry cleaning business and a dress shop, but sold them to buy the Playhouse Lounge. Preddy was approached by the NAACP to try to break the color line against dealers. When she was unable to secure a gaming license for her own club, she agreed to a six-month trial at Jerry's Nugget and ended up staying seven years. Preddy left Jerry's to run for a seat on the Las Vegas City Council and was the first black to win a primary. But in the final contest, she lost the seat by seventy-two votes. She returned to the gaming business, buying and operating the People's Choice Casino. She was heavily involved in trying to revitalize West Vegas, which had declined after desegregation. She operated a non-profit and tried to attract investors. She, her husband and son worked to get the historic Moulin Rouge Hotel listed on the National Register of Historic Places. They succeeded, bought the hotel and reopened it for business, but a fire destroyed the interior in 2003 and a second one 2009 destroyed the structure.

Preddy was awarded an honorary doctorate by the University of Nevada, Las Vegas, and had been the subject of numerous projects, including interviews and documentaries, to preserve the history of West Las Vegas, prior to her 2014 death.

== Early life and background ==
Sarann Chiles was born on July 27, 1920, in Eufaula, Oklahoma to Carl and Hattie Chiles. Preddy, of mixed ancestry — white, Spanish, Muscogee, and African-American — married Luther Walker, shortly after finishing high school in Okmulgee, Oklahoma and moved with her husband and father to Las Vegas in 1942. (Note: Preddy's father and husband were hired to work at the newly established Basic Magnesium Plant in Henderson, Nevada. The plant was part of the war effort during World War II.) Preddy's enthusiasism for business came from her parents, who were successful entrepreneurs; her father owned a cinder block factory before the family's move to Las Vegas. (Note: After leaving the magnesium plant, Carl Childs went into the construction business in Las Vegas; he helped to build the Moulin Rouge in 1955.) Preddy recalled her first venture into business; at age 13 she was selling pig's feet for five cents and was hard pressed to obtain enough to satisfy her customers.

== Career prospects ==
By the time Preddy arrived in Las Vegas, the city had become segregated and blacks were unable to live in Downtown Las Vegas. The center of their lives were in West Las Vegas where they could live and operate businesses. Though allowed as performers or employees in white clubs on the Las Vegas Strip, they returned after hours to the clubs in West Vegas, which were owned by both black entrepreneurs and Chinese business people. Preddy's remembrances were that though blacks were not allowed to go to the downtown clubs, the children did go to school together and they attended the same churches and many performers, black and white frequented the black after hours clubs. Finding few opportunities for work, Preddy went to Los Angeles and attended business school before returning to Las Vegas, where she became a Keno writer at the Cotton Club. She also learned to deal 21 and divorced her first husband.

Remarried, to William Scruggs, she followed him to Hawthorne, Nevada, where she bought the Lincoln Bar. She purchased the property for $US 600 in 1951, renamed it the Tonga Club and operated it as a gaming nightclub for seven years, becoming the first black woman in Nevada to hold a gaming license. Preddy returned to Las Vegas in 1957 because the ammunition depot, which was the largest employer in Hawthorne closed. Her first job on returning was at the El Morocco, which closed after a year and she moved to the Louisiana Club and then on to the Town Tavern. These clubs were all owned by African-American men, who hired African-Americans to staff their venues. (Note: Venues such as the Town and Tavern and El Morocco were known as "after hours" clubs. Before integration, African-American entertainers would appear at these clubs after their nightly shows on the Las Vegas Strip.) She was dealing at all of these clubs, but in 1958, the City of Las Vegas passed an ordinance which forbade women to work as dealers. For a brief time, she operated a dry cleaning establishment and dress shop, but she sold it and used the proceeds to buy the Playhouse Lounge. Unable to get a gaming license, she sold out and went to work at Jerry's Nugget. The National Association for the Advancement of Colored People (NAACP) was working on integrating casinos and had been told if they could find an experienced woman, Jerry's would hire a black dealer. When she was approached, Preddy agreed to try it for six months and ended up staying on for seven years.

== Later years ==
Preddy left Jerry's in 1979, to run for a commissioner's seat on the Las Vegas City Council. She was the first black to win a primary and in the final vote was defeated by seventy-two votes in a heated contest. After the loss, she bought Woody's Supper Club and changed the name to Sarann's Supper Club. Quickly realizing that the location was too small to create an up-scale dining establishment, she renamed it again to the People's Choice Casino, got a gaming license and put in some poker and Blackjack tables. After six or seven years, she began looking at purchasing the Moulin Rouge Hotel in 1989. Preddy used her own assets to restore the hotel, even selling her own home to fund the project. The Moulin Rouge had been closed since its 1955 bankruptcy. Preddy made a deal to lease the Moulin Rouge with an option to buy the property. (Note: Before Preddy and her husband purchased the Moulin Rouge, she had hopes of seeing the hotel restored and that she might be able to operate the casino for whoever would buy the property. The couple was not able to acquire enough financing to renovate the property and were eventually forced to sell the Moulin Rouge to a developer who planned to rehabilitate the structure.) Though she had a gaming license for the People's Choice, it took her from 1985 to 1990 to secure a license for the Moulin Rouge. She initially opened the Moulin Rouge with only a liquor license and ran it as a cocktail bar. (Note: Obtaining a license to operate a casino can be difficult because all investors of the project are fully investigated. Some people do not want to be investigated in such a way and do not invest because of this. If any problems turn up with any of the investors as a result of the investigations into their dealings and character, the casino license is not granted.)

The Moulin Rouge was the first integrated hotel-casino in Las Vegas and after years of advocacy, Preddy, her husband Joe Preddy and their son James Walker succeeded in 1992 in their quest to have it placed on the National Register of Historic Places. (Note: Preddy's husband, Joe, died in 1999.) In 2009, a fire destroyed the entire structure of the Moulin Rouge. (Note: There was an earlier major fire at the hotel in 2003.) The Las Vegas Historic Preservation Commission approved a plan which called for the demolition of the hotel's ruins in June 2010. Demolition began the next month with some residents calling for some remains of the building to be left standing due to their historic value. While the loss of the structure saddened Preddy, she said that the building was not historic, but the land it once occupied is. Building an updated Moulin Rouge on the original site would still make the property of historical significance. The hotel and casino was the site where an agreement putting an end to segregation on the Las Vegas Strip was signed on March 26, 1960.

In the 1980s, Sarann and Bob Bailey began a non-profit organization with hopes of revitalizing Jackson Avenue (known to locals as Jackson Street). Sarann became president of the Jackson Street Redevelopment Company, which had plans to create a pedestrian mall along four blocks of west Las Vegas, the historic black neighborhood of the city. They got contracts signed, were promised federal loan funds, had a feasibility study completed and made a marketing video. As late as 2000, Preddy was still trying to convince investors and city founders to create a welcoming space for development by ridding the area of crime and provide an infusion of capital to stop the decay of the historic area, but by 2005, the city had pulled out of the investment plan.

== Legacy ==
For her efforts over the years, Preddy was awarded an honorary doctorate by the University of Nevada, Las Vegas. Preddy is only the second African-American woman to be accorded the honor; the other recipient is Diana Ross. In 2011, Preddy was awarded the Racial Harmony Hall Of Fame Lifetime Achievement Award and she was featured in at least two documentaries: one called The Gaming Queen released in 2012 and another released in 2014 by the UNLV’s Women’s Research Institute in conjunction with PBS Las Vegas in the series MAKERS: Women in Nevada History.

Preddy served on a local board of the NAACP, co-founded a node of the Democratic Club in Las Vegas, and held a leadership role in the Gamma Phi Delta sorority. Preddy published her autobiography, 72 Years in Las Vegas in 2014. Preddy died in 2014.
