= Westin Casuarina =

Westin Casuarina may refer to:

- Westin Grand Cayman, hotel formerly known as Westin Casuarina
- Westin Las Vegas, hotel formerly known as Westin Casuarina
