= Dennis Gomes =

American executive and gaming regulator

Dennis Gomes (1944–2012) was an American executive, gaming regulator who was the co-owner and chief executive officer of Resorts Casino Hotel in Atlantic City, New Jersey.

== Biography ==
Gomes began his career in casino regulation, working for the Nevada Gaming Control Board during the 1970s. He investigated organized crime involvement in Las Vegas casinos, including illegal revenue-skimming operations at the Stardust. These investigations contributed to the events depicted in Martin Scorsese's 1995 film Casino. He subsequently served as an investigator for the New Jersey Division of Gaming Enforcement.

After moving into casino management, Gomes held executive positions at the Golden Nugget Las Vegas, Trump Taj Mahal and Tropicana Atlantic City. At the Tropicana, he oversaw the development of The Quarter, a retail and entertainment complex that opened in 2004. In 2010, he partnered with real estate developer Morris Bailey to acquire Resorts Casino Hotel. Under his management, the property adopted a 1920s theme inspired by the television series Boardwalk Empire.

Gomes died at Thomas Jefferson University Hospital in Philadelphia on February 24, 2012, following complications from kidney dialysis.
