= Carson station =

Carson station or Carson Station may refer to:

- Carson station (Charlotte), a Lynx Blue Line station in Charlotte
- Carson (Los Angeles Metro station), in Los Angeles
- Max Casino, formerly Carson Station, a casino in Carson City, Nevada
