= West Las Vegas riots =

1992 riots following the beating of Rodney King

The West Las Vegas riots were sparked on April 29, 1992, after the Rodney King verdict, where all four white LAPD officers were acquitted for the beating of motorist Rodney King in Los Angeles, California. After the Los Angeles riots were sparked, Black residents of West Las Vegas started to loot and burned several stores. Gun battles had started with snipers at intersections and a white motorist was pulled from his vehicle and beaten.

The violence occurred just 7 miles away from the Las Vegas Strip. Las Vegas police officers placed buses under Interstate 15 to keep rioters from crossing out of West Las Vegas and into the downtown area. After the riots, one person was killed, $6 million in property was damaged, and the tensions with the police lasted the next 18 days.

== See also ==
- List of incidents of civil unrest in the United States
