= People's Choice Casino =

Casino in Nevada, United States

- Interactive map of People's Choice Casino
- Address: 805 West Owens; Las Vegas, Nevada; United States
- Owner: Sarann Knight-Preddy

The People's Choice Casino was a club located at 805 West Owens on the West Side of Las Vegas, Nevada.

== History ==
Sarann Knight-Preddy and her husband Joe bought the business which was called Woody's Supper Club and changed the name to Sarann's Supper Club. She wanted to build an up-scale dining club, but realized that the kitchen was too small and the expense of supplies would make the food too costly, so Preddy decided to convert it into a casino. She renamed it again to the People's Choice Casino, got a gaming license and put in some poker and blackjack tables.

The casino had a license for blackjack, poker, and slot machines and Preddy owned it around seven years. It is unknown when the business closed. It was still listed as a business operation in the 1989 phone book and when Clarence Ray was interviewed for the University of Nevada's Oral History Program, he stated it was still open in 1991.

== Sources ==
- Blue, Helen M.; Coughtry, Jamie (1991). "CLARENCE RAY Black Politics and Gaming in Las Vegas, 1920s-1980s" (PDF). University of Nevada Oral History Program. Reno, NV: University of Nevada: 83. Archived from the original (PDF) on 23 September 2015.
- White, Claytee D. (June 5, 1997). "Transcript of interview with Sarann Knight Preddy". Las Vegas, Nevada: University of Nevada Las Vegas. Archived from the original on September 23, 2015.
