= West Las Vegas =

Historic neighborhood in Las Vegas, Nevada, United States

Coordinates: 36.13454°N 115.28915°W

- Neighborhood
- Interactive map of West Las Vegas
- Country: United States
- State: Nevada
- City: Las Vegas

West Las Vegas is a historic neighborhood in Las Vegas, Nevada. This 3.5 sq mi (9.1 km^{2}) area is located northwest of the Las Vegas Strip and the "Spaghetti Bowl" interchange of I-15 and I-11/US 95. It is also known as Historic West Las Vegas and more simply, the Westside. The area is roughly bounded by Carey Avenue, Bonanza Road, I-15 and Rancho Drive.

== History ==
In the 1920s no segregation laws on the books barred black citizens from participating in community life, but with legalization of gambling (1931), repeal of prohibition (1933) and completion of the Boulder Dam (1935) and with tourism on the rise, casino owners began restricting their patrons to whites only. This was mainly due to the influx of Southerners caused by the previously mentioned events; pioneer Nevada had no colour bar. Blacks were allowed to entertain or work in casinos, but they were not allowed to attend shows, live in the casino district, or obtain or renew business licenses. In response to the segregation, blacks in effect created their own Las Vegas that offered everything the real city did. The area even had its own version of the Las Vegas Strip, the Black Strip in an area around Jackson Avenue. In 1942, when Sarann Knight-Preddy moved to Las Vegas, the only club on the west side was the Harlem Club. It was followed by the Brown Derby (1944) and later that same year, the Cotton Club.

By 1947, four black-owned clubs were found on Jackson Street: the Brown Derby, the Chickadee (sometimes styled as the Chic-A Dee Club), the Cotton Club, and the Ebony Club. In addition to black-owned clubs, clubs owned by Chinese immigrants targeted black customers and did not have discriminatory hiring practices. Chinese-owned clubs included the Chickadee (later known as Zee Louie's Chickadee Club and even later as the Louisiana Club); the Westside Club; and the Town Tavern.

The area was booming by the 1940s and 1950s, in part due to the ammunition depot at nearby Hawthorne, but also because black entertainers who worked in the clubs on the strip weren't allowed to stay on the strip. When they finished their performances, they came to party, relax, or jam at the Westside clubs. Town Tavern was one of the "hot spots" frequented by such performers as Louis Armstrong, The Ink Spots, Little Milton, Ed Sullivan in the 1950s and up until desegregation Cab Calloway, Chubby Checker, Nat King Cole, Sammy Davis Jr., Sonny Liston or other notables might be seen regularly.

The Moulin Rouge Hotel opened on May 24, 1955, and was the first integrated hotel casino in Las Vegas. It had all the same amenities — gourmet food, pool, casino, lounge, and showroom — as hotels on the strip. It had taken $3.5 million to build and quickly became a sensation, appearing on the June 20th, 1955 cover of Life magazine and the place where all of the A-list performers of the late 1950s performed, such as Louis Armstrong, Tallulah Bankhead, Harry Belafonte, Milton Berle, Nat King Cole, Sammy Davis Jr., Tommy and Jimmy Dorsey, Bob Hope, Dean Martin, Frank Sinatra, and many others. But just as quickly, it crashed, when in November, 1955 it closed and by December its owners had filed bankruptcy.

In 1958, for the first time gambling regulations were passed which set up inspectors and a Gaming Control Board. One of the first inspectors was Clarence Ray, who would later operate the only licensed dealing school to train black dealers for work on the strip at the beginning of desegregation. In 1960, Hank Greenspun, one time owner of the Las Vegas Sun, met with city leaders and members of the NAACP at the closed Moulin Rouge to work out the desegregation agreement for all of the casinos of the Strip. Once segregation lost its hold on the city, the area fell into disrepair as the more prosperous blacks moved to other areas of the community, or preferred to work on the Strip for the higher wages offered. In 1971, Vegas housing codes were modified to prevent redlining, allowing blacks to move out of West Vegas.

Many people in the community felt there was an effort to prevent blacks from owning clubs. Senator Joe Neal confirmed that licenses were denied after the Civil Rights Movement. There were attempts to keep the area thriving, like when Leonard Roy and his son tried to revamp the Moulin Rouge and reopen it in 1977. They were unable to obtain liquor licenses, so they opened a coffee shop there and ran the hotel for three years before it failed again. In the 1980s, Bob Bailey began a non-profit organization with hopes of revitalizing Jackson Avenue (known to locals as Jackson Street). Knight-Preddy became president of the Jackson Street Redevelopment Company, which had plans to create a pedestrian mall along four blocks of west Las Vegas, the historic black neighborhood of the city. They got contracts signed, were promised federal loan funds, had a feasibility study completed and made a marketing video.

Knight-Preddy, her husband Joe Preddy and their son, James Walker, made another attempt to revive the Moulin Rouge in the early 1990s, and had difficulty obtaining licenses. Then in 1992, the West Las Vegas riots, sparked by the Rodney King verdicts spread into West Las Vegas and resulted in property damage and mob violence, which continued for several weeks. Later that same year, Knight-Preddy got the Moulin Rouge approved on the National Register of Historic Places and hoped that it would spark revitalization, but it burned in a major fire in 2003 and again in 2009. As late as 2000, Preddy was still trying to convince investors and city founders to create a welcoming space for development by ridding the area of crime and provide an infusion of capital to stop the decay of the historic area, but by 2005, the city had pulled out of the investment plan.

== Landmarks ==
Historical clubs include B.J.’s Lounge, the Black Orchid, the Brown Derby Club, the Chickadee Club, the Cotton Club, Club Alabama, the Ebony Club, El Morocco, the El Rio Tavern, the Green Lantern, the Harlem Club, the Heritage Lounge, the Little Casino, Louisiana Club, Love's Cocktail Lounge, Low Cost Games, People's Choice Casino, the Round Up Casino, the Silver Club & Cafe, the Square Deal Club, Town Tavern, the Westside Club, and the Westside Story.

Notable hotels were the Carver House located at 400 W. Jackson Street, the Cove Hotel also located at 400 W. Jackson Street, and the Moulin Rouge located at 900 West Bonanza.

The West Las Vegas Library includes a theater.

== Sources ==
- Blue, Helen M.; Coughtry, Jamie (1991). "CLARENCE RAY Black Politics and Gaming in Las Vegas, 1920s-1980s". University of Nevada Oral History Program. Reno, NV: University of Nevada: 83.
- Bracey, Earnest N. (2008). The Moulin Rouge and Black Rights in Las Vegas: A History of the First Racially Integrated Hotel-Casino. Jefferson, North Carolina: McFarland. ISBN 978-0-7864-5251-4.
- Embry, Jessie L. (2013). Oral History, Community, and Work in the American West. University of Arizona Press. ISBN 978-0-8165-9927-1.
- Goertler, Pam (October–December 2008). "A West Side Story" (PDF). Casino Chip and Token News. 21 Number (4). Casino Chip and Gaming Token Collectors Club, Inc.
- Hershwitzky, Patricia (2011). West Las Vegas. Charleston, South Carolina: Arcadia Publishing. ISBN 978-0-7385-8196-5.
- Littlejohn, David (1999). The Real Las Vegas: Life Beyond the Strip. New York: Oxford University Press. ISBN 978-0-19-028488-6.
- McKee, Robert J. (2014). Community Action against Racism in West Las Vegas: The F Street Wall and the Women Who Brought It Down. Lanham, Maryland: Lexington Books. ISBN 978-0-7391-8678-7.
- Simich, Jerry L.; Wright, Thomas C. (2005). The Peoples of Las Vegas: One City, Many Faces. University of Nevada Press. ISBN 978-0-87417-616-2.
- White, Claytee D. (June 5, 1997). "Transcript of interview with Sarann Knight Preddy". Las Vegas, Nevada: University of Nevada Las Vegas. Archived from the original on September 23, 2015.
