= Westin Las Vegas =

Hotel in Nevada, United States

The Westin Las Vegas Hotel & Spa
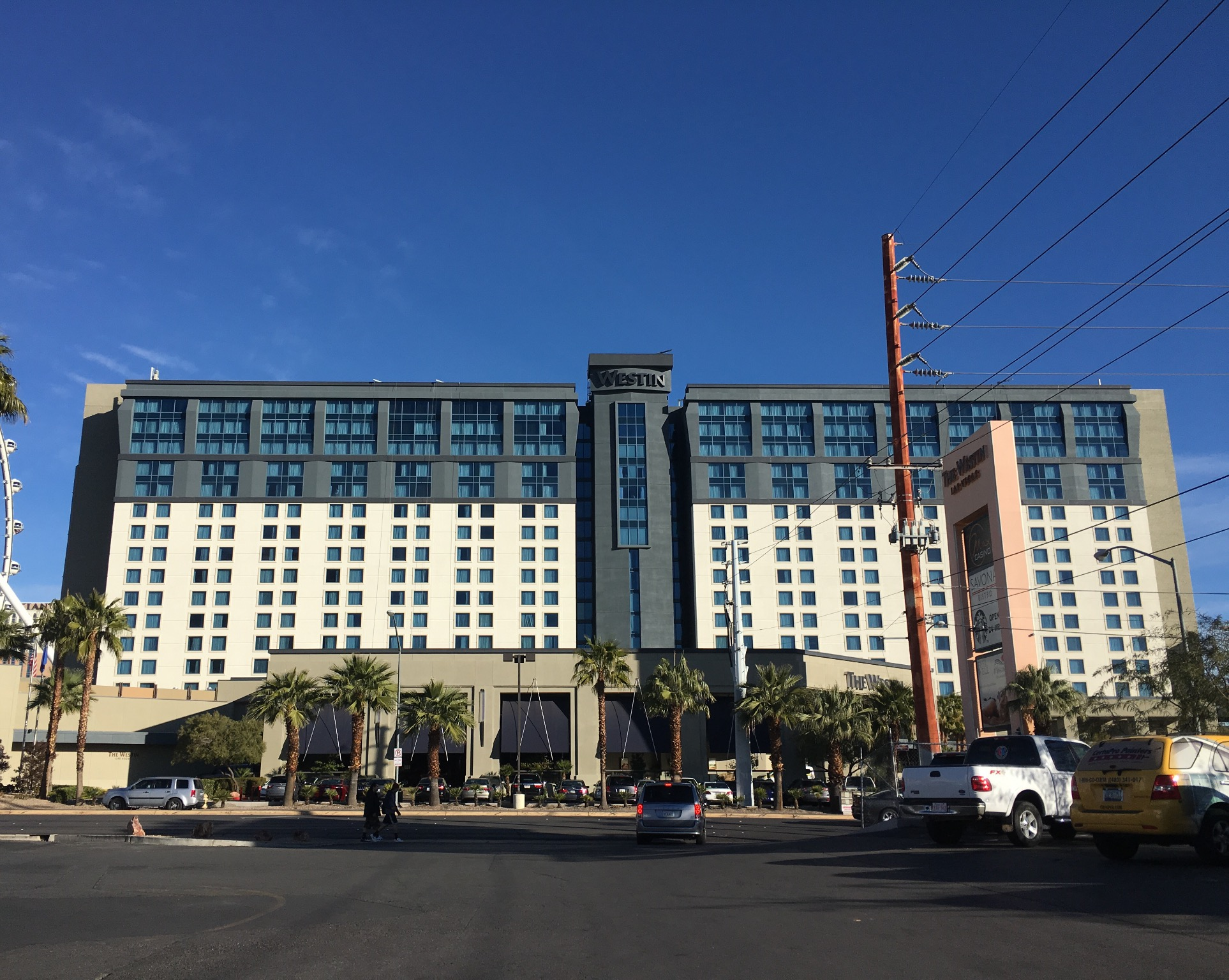
- Hotel chain: Westin Hotels & Resorts

General information
- Location: Paradise, Nevada, 160 East Flamingo Road
- Coordinates: 36.1151°N 115.1658°W
- Opening: July 1, 1977; 49 years ago (as Maxim); November 6, 2003; 22 years ago (as Westin)
- Owner: Highgate & Cerberus Capital Management

Other information
- Number of rooms: 826
- Number of suites: 13

Website
- westinvegas.com

The Westin Las Vegas Hotel & Spa is a hotel and former casino near the Las Vegas Strip in Paradise, Nevada. The Westin is owned by Highgate and Cerberus Capital Management, and uses the Westin brand under franchise from Marriott International. It is noteworthy for being one of the first Las Vegas resorts to prohibit smoking in almost all parts of the property.

== History ==
=== Maxim Hotel (1977–2001) ===
The property was originally opened on July 1, 1977, as the Maxim Hotel and Casino. It was built at a cost of $25 million by a group of ten Nevada businessmen, including the owners of Reno's Club Cal Neva. Though smaller than typical Vegas resorts even before today's megaresort era, the Maxim had a popular following because of its attention to personal service. It was purchased in 1981 by wealthy California farmer John Anderson for $60 million. It thrived during the 1980s, but went into decline as flashier, larger resorts opened on the nearby Strip. The Maxim Hotel and Casino was a main filming location and setting for a 1987 episode of Matlock, "The Gambler". The Maxim was also the featured hotel in the pilot for the ABC Aaron Spelling prime time TV series, Vega$, starring actor Robert Urich, as Las Vegas private detective DanTanna.

The Maxim was next to the street location of the shooting death of rapper Tupac Shakur in 1996. Shakur was a passenger in a BMW that was driving on Tropicana Avenue, in front of the casino, when a man in a Cadillac pulled up next to his car, opened fire, gravely wounding the rap star. Shakur died a week later from his bullet wounds.

In 1998, West Coast Mortgage foreclosed on the Maxim, buying it from Anderson at a price of $15 million. Gaming executive Ed Nigro agreed to operate the property under a five-year lease. West Coast then sold the Maxim to timeshare developer Premier Interval Resorts the following year for $36.5 million. In November 1999, Nigro closed the Maxim because of a financial dispute with Premier. With Premier in default on its mortgage payments, the Maxim was placed into receivership at the request of the mortgageholder, Meralex; two weeks after its closure, the hotel reopened without a casino. The property again went to foreclosure auction in June 2000, where it was purchased by a Texas-based company, Revanche, for $10 million. A complex legal battle ensued between members of Premier and Meralex; meanwhile, Revanche unsuccessfully sought a buyer for the Maxim. With the hotel continuing to lose money, Revanche closed it on August 13, 2001.

=== The Westin (2003–present) ===
Columbia Sussex bought the former Maxim from Revanche for $38 million in 2002, and then spent an additional $90 million on the remodel. They reopened the hotel as The Westin Casuarina on November 6, 2003, using the name of their successful resort in the Cayman Islands. The Westin Casuarina marked the first Westin resort nationwide to feature a casino and was the first Westin in Nevada.

In November 2010, lenders CWCapital Asset Management LLC filed for foreclosure on The Westin Casuarina, after Columbia Sussex stopped making payments on the property's $160 million mortgage in April. The hotel's general manager said in October 2011 that Columbia Sussex would not fight the foreclosure, and that the hotel was overleveraged due to property values declining in the recession. Lenders asked a court to appoint Pyramid Hotel Group as receiver to operate the resort. Pyramid leased the property's casino to 777 Gaming, a Las Vegas company that has operated several rural casinos, including the Carson Station in Carson City. The Carson Station was renamed the Max Casino in 2014, and 777 gaming also is a slot route, for four years beginning in May 2012.

The hotel was later renamed The Westin Las Vegas. The casino floor had fewer than 300 slot and video poker machines and only ten table games, far smaller than Strip megaresorts and even smaller than many casinos catering to local residents. Instead, the resort concentrated more on its hotel amenities, including a destination spa.

In January 2016, Fortress Investment Group acquired the property through foreclosure, and brought Crescent Hotels & Resorts in to manage it. The hotel announced later that year that it would phase out its casino facilities and operate purely as a hotel. The casino closed in July 2017, to be replaced with a restaurant and expanded meeting spaces.

Fortress sold the Westin in September 2018 for $196 million to hotel firm Highgate in partnership with Cerberus Capital Management.
