= Jerry's Nugget =

Casino in Nevada, United States

Coordinates: 36.1930°N 115.1326°W

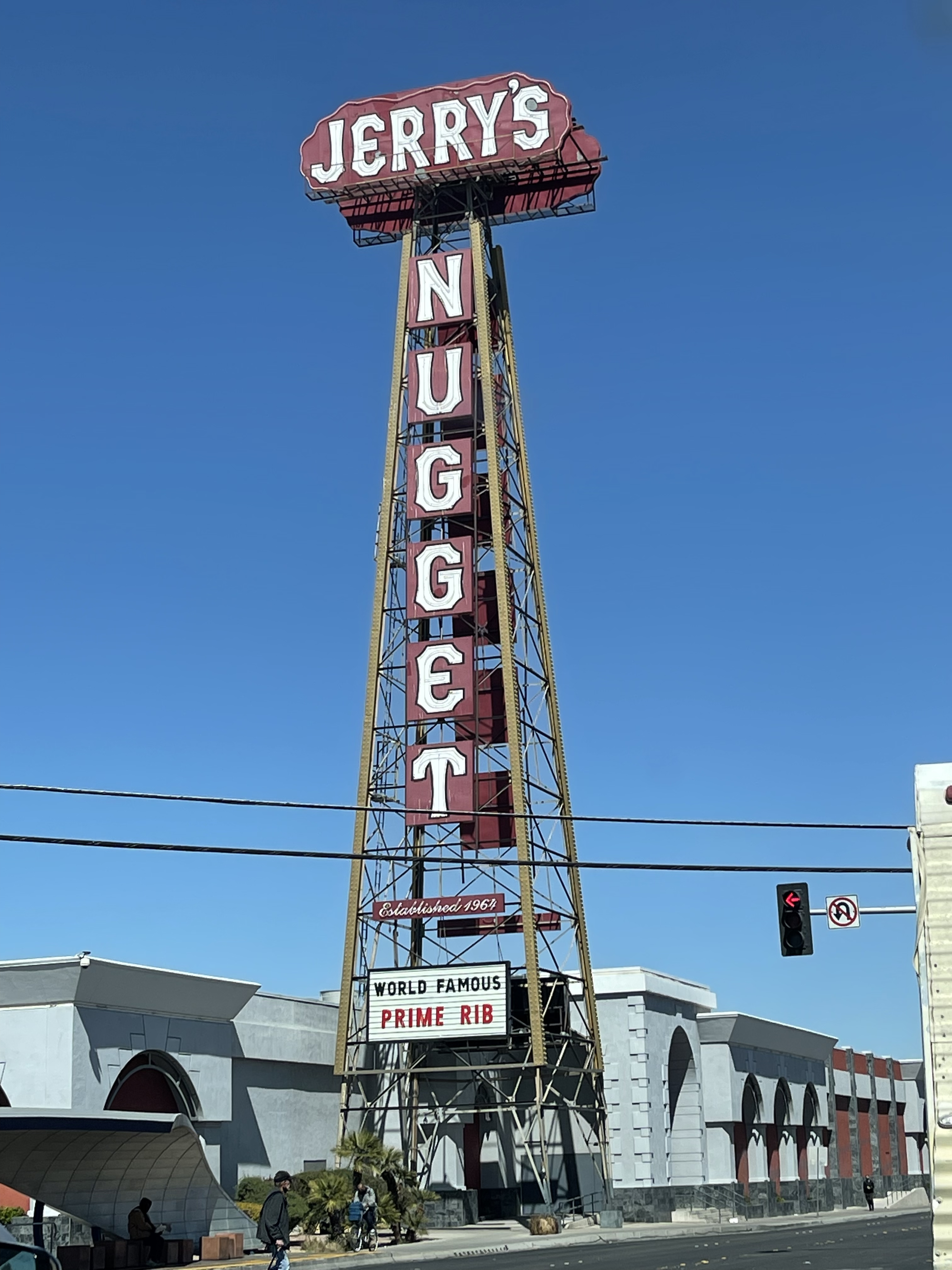
- Oil derrick neon sign
- Interactive map of Jerry's Nugget
- Location: North Las Vegas, Nevada; 1821 North Las Vegas Blvd.
- Opened: Bonanza Club; February 24, 1956; Jerry's Nugget; December 1964 (original location); November 1968 (present location)
- Gaming space: 32,511 square feet (3,000 m^{2})
- Owner: Stamis family
- Renovated in: 1983; 1996
- Website: jerrysnugget.com

Jerry's Nugget is a locals casino in North Las Vegas, Nevada. It was opened in 1964, by Jerry Lodge and his brother-in-law Jerry Stamis, and continues to be owned and operated by members of the Stamis family. In 1968, Jerry's Nugget moved down the street to its present location: a larger building which previously operated as the Bonanza Club from 1956 to 1967. Jerry's Nugget underwent further expansions in 1983 and 1996. The casino includes 32,511 sq ft (3,020.4 m^{2}) of gaming space.

== History ==
Jerry's Nugget originally opened at 1856 North Las Vegas Boulevard, in what used to be the Town House Bar. The present location operates at 1821 North Las Vegas Boulevard, originally the site of the Bonanza Club casino.

=== Bonanza Club ===
Groundbreaking for the Bonanza Club took place on March 28, 1955. It opened on February 24, 1956, following a delay. It included a casino, dining, and a stage for live entertainment.

Brothers L. A. and W. H. Adams took over the Bonanza Club in 1958. The following year, the Nevada Gaming Control Board investigated the casino after complaints of cheating; agents confiscated two altered dice and a short deck of cards. The Adams brothers surrendered their gaming license, but denied any knowledge of cheating. The casino's former pit boss testified that he had put the dice into use, without the Adamses' knowledge, in order to deter gamblers on winning streaks. He denied knowledge of how the short deck came into play.

Elsewhere in Nevada, the Adamses continued operating the Carson Nugget. The newly formed Nevada Gaming Commission considered revoking their Carson Nugget license as a result of the Bonanza Club cheating. It was the first license revocation to be considered by the agency.

Don French purchased and reopened the Bonanza Club later in 1959. He sold it to general manager Gus Thiros in 1965, but the property closed a year later, due to financial problems. French took over again and reopened the Bonanza Club at the end of 1966. Bill Greenrod purchased it in mid-1967 and renamed it the Big Bonanza.

=== Jerry's Nugget ===
Jerry's Nugget was founded by Jerry Lodge and his brother-in-law Jerry Stamis, both immigrants from Greece. Lodge had previously operated casinos in Alaska and Idaho, as well as Lovelock, Nevada. Jerry's Nugget opened, at its original location, in December 1964. The casino was 6,400 sq ft (590 m^{2}).

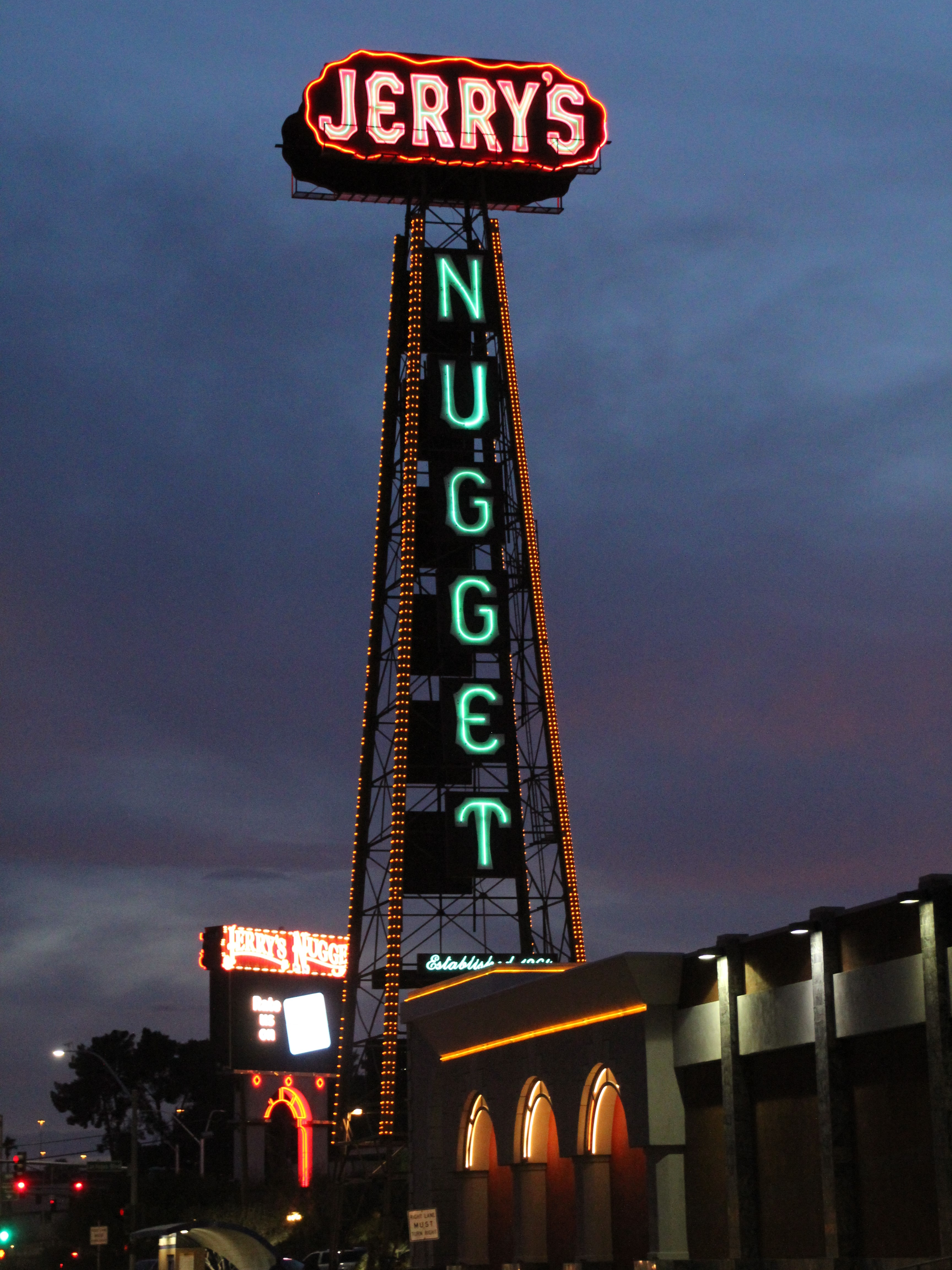
Neon oil derrick at night

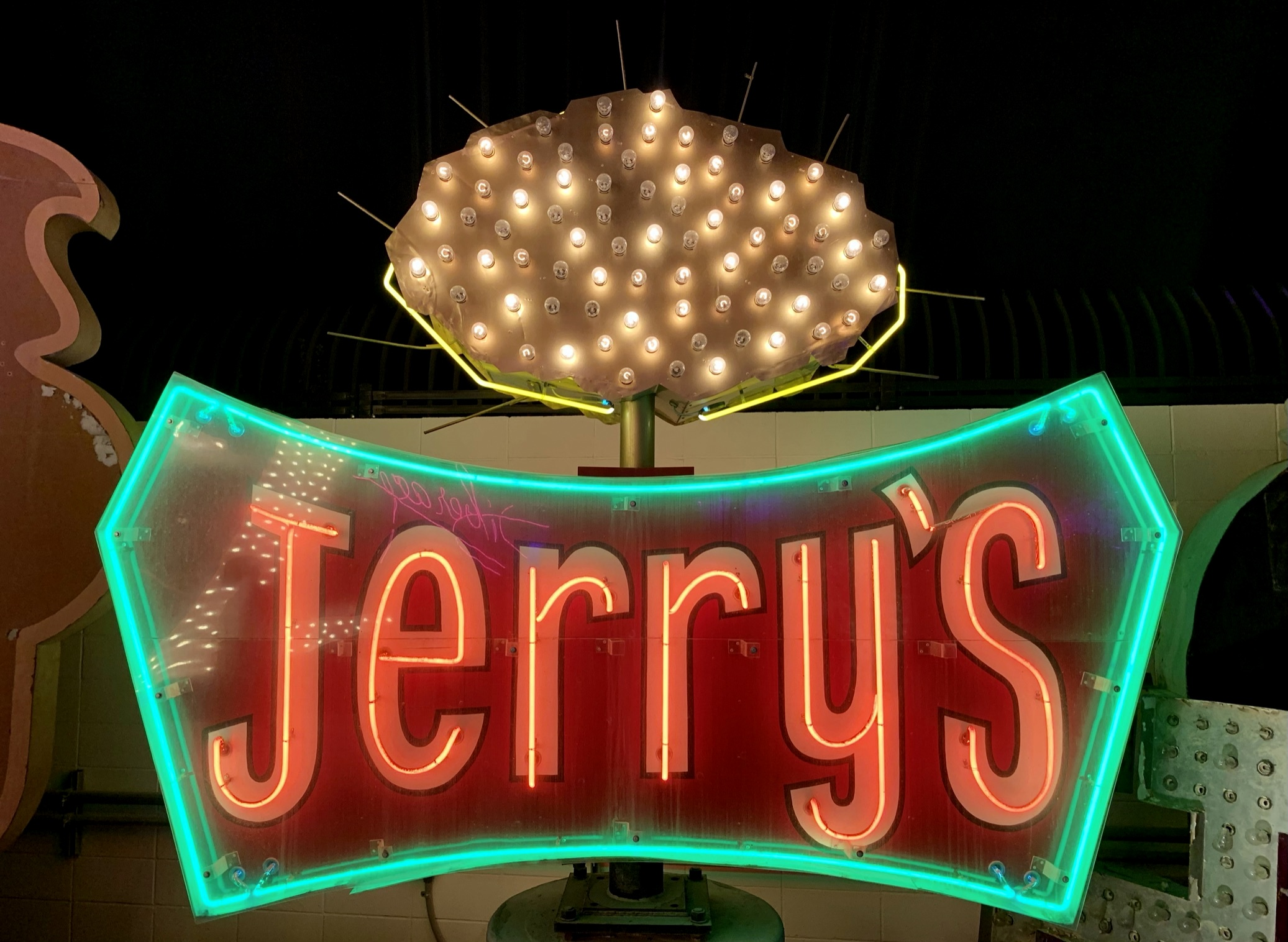
Original lettering used atop the derrick, now stored at the Neon Museum in Las Vegas

Greenrod closed the Big Bonanza on November 6, 1967, after agreeing to sell it to the Stamis family. The Bonanza was just southwest of the original Jerry's Nugget, on the opposite side of the street. The former Bonanza building was remodeled and opened as the new Jerry's Nugget in early November 1968, with 10,000 sq ft (930 m^{2}) of additional space. The Bonanza had included a neon oil derrick, which was once the tallest sign in Las Vegas. It was retained and updated to feature the "Jerry's Nugget" name. The site of the original Jerry's Nugget became a parking lot for the relocated casino.

Jerry's Nugget was renovated and expanded in 1983. Stamis died 10 years later, at the age of 92. Surviving members of the Stamis family continue to own and operate Jerry's Nugget.

In 1996, Jerry's Nugget received an $18 million renovation that expanded the casino and increased the number of slot machines from 600 to 770. The bingo parlor was increased in size, and a poker room was built as well, but closed within two years. The project also added the 95-seat Royal Street Theatre, as well as the Magnolia Room, an upscale restaurant.

Lodge died in 2001, at the age of 85. As of 2004, the property employed 465 people and was considering the addition of a boutique hotel with 200 to 250 rooms, although this never panned out. A new restaurant, Jerry's Famous Coffee Shop, opened in 2006.

Angelo Stamis, son of Jerry, had once been involved in gaming operations at the casino, until a blackjack cheating allegation in the 1970s. He continued to remain involved in food operations, and successfully petitioned for the state to restore his gaming license in 2008. Within a few years, the property was taken over by Angelo's sons, Jeremy and Joseph Stamis, marking the third generation of family ownership. The casino's bingo hall was refurbished in 2012.

Lender U.S. Bank filed a lawsuit in March 2012 asking for a receiver to be installed after Jerry's Nugget defaulted on payments on a $3.6 million loan. After months of talks failed to produce an agreement, the casino filed for Chapter 11 bankruptcy protection in August. A year later, the casino received a loan that allowed it to win approval for its Chapter 11 reorganization plan.

Jerry's Nugget is a locals casino, popular among residents throughout the Las Vegas Valley. The property is well known for its food, especially its desserts. The casino has 32,511 sq ft (3,020.4 m^{2}) of gaming space.

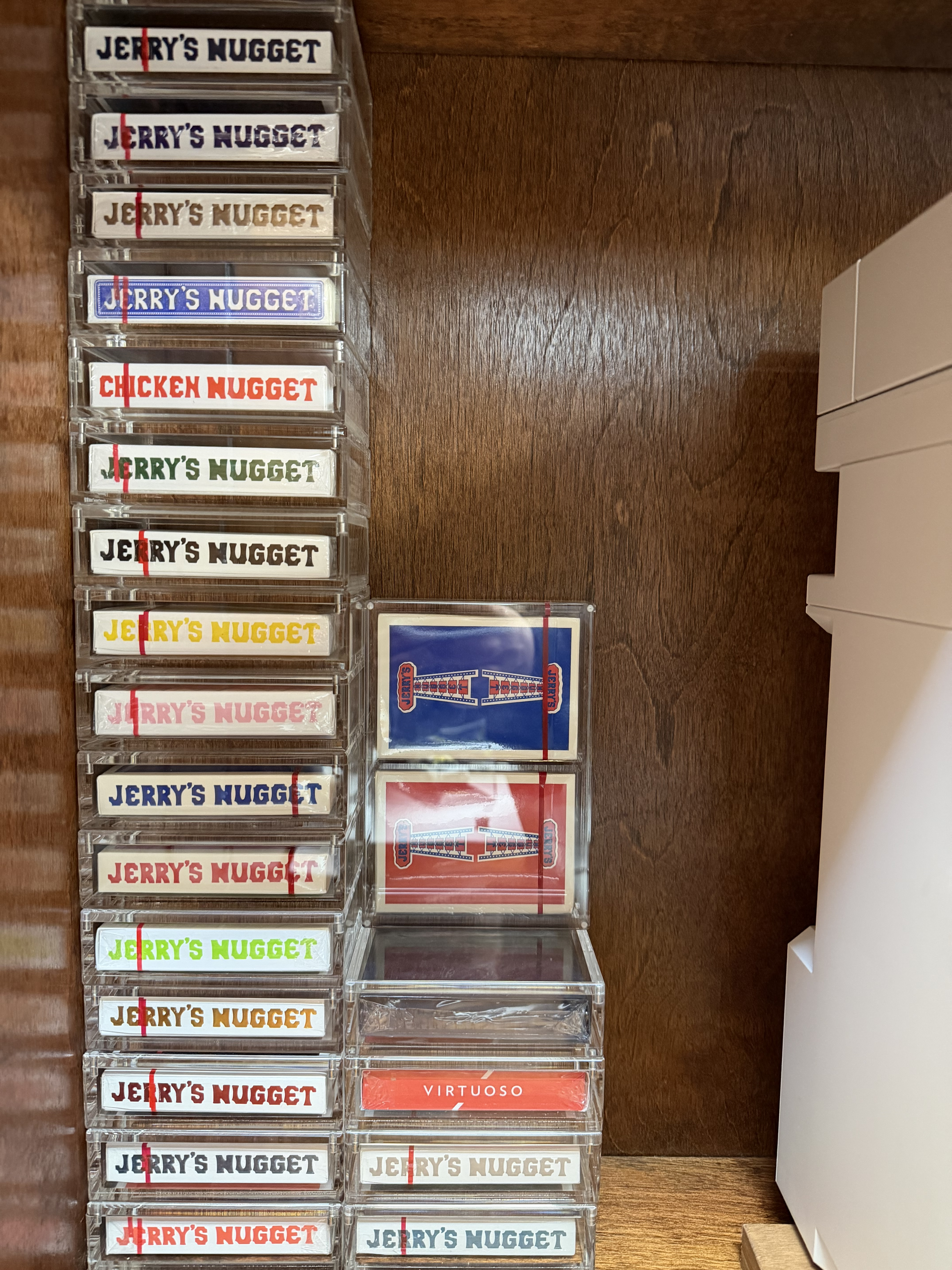

== Playing cards ==
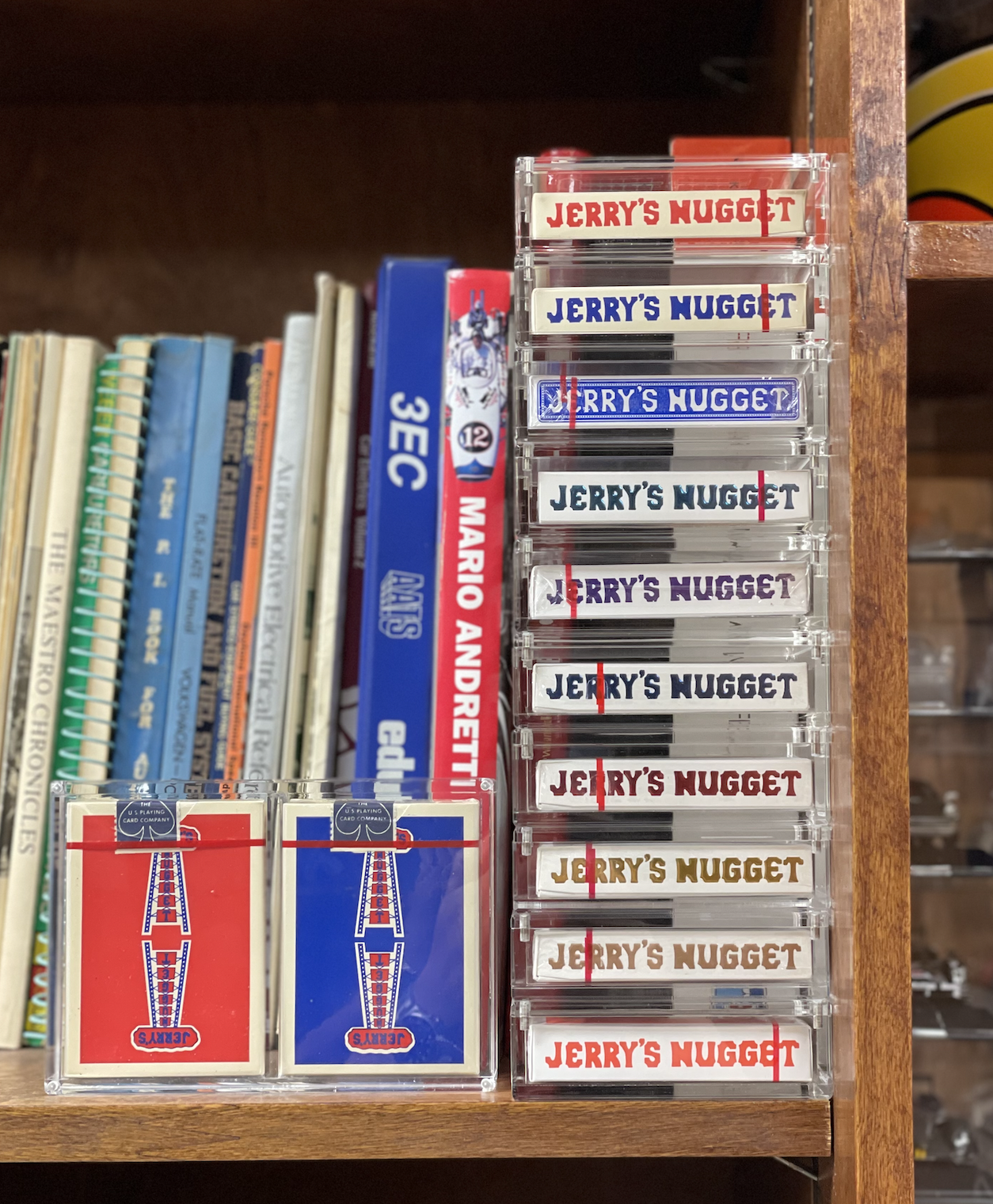
The Jerry's Nugget cards from 1970 and 2019

In 1970, the casino ordered a new batch of playing cards from United States Playing Card Company (USPCC). The cards wound up in storage for the next 20 years, until they were rediscovered and put on sale in the casino's gift shop at $1 per deck. After magicians duo Dan & Dave used them in their flourishes, they quickly became popular among magicians who use a lot of cards in their acts. The price increased to $2 a deck, and the cards were sold out by 1999. They have since become valuable collector's items, selling online for hundreds of dollars.

Around 2016, Expert Playing Card Company initiated an effort for USPCC to reproduce the cards, and spent several years trying to get in contact with Jerry's Nugget for permission to proceed. The casino agreed to the proposal in 2018, and the new decks went on sale a year later, using modern methods to replicate the original cards as closely as possible.
