= Louisiana Club =

Club in Nevada, United States

- Interactive map of Louisiana Club
- Address: 1322 North F Street; Las Vegas, Nevada; United States

Construction
- Opened: August 16, 1955
- Closed: May 20, 1970

The Louisiana Club was a club located at 1322 North F Street on the West Side of Las Vegas, Nevada.

== History ==
It opened on August 16, 1955, and while some sources say the original owner of the club was named Wong who operated it until April 18, 1966, others say it was originally named Zee Louie's Chickadee Club and was later changed to the Louisiana Club but that it closed in 1957 when Zhei Lhou moved to San Francisco, and still others say it was called the Chickadee, but when Zee Louie bought it, he renamed it the Louisiana Club. In 1957 or 1958 when Sarann Knight-Preddy, who had returned from Hawthorne, Nevada, where she had run the first club licensed to a black woman went to work there it was named the Louisiana and Zee Louie (also known as Zhei Lhou) reportedly acquired it on April 19, 1966, after he returned from San Francisco.

Though its ownership is unclear, sources agree that the owners were Chinese and that there was no issue with racism there which was encountered in white-owned businesses. The club was licensed for blackjack, craps, keno and slot machines. The Louisiana closed on May 20, 1970.

== Sources ==
- Blue, Helen M.; Coughtry, Jamie (1991). "CLARENCE RAY Black Politics and Gaming in Las Vegas, 1920s-1980s" (PDF). University of Nevada Oral History Program. Reno, NV: University of Nevada: 83.
- Bracey, Earnest N. (2008). The Moulin Rouge and Black Rights in Las Vegas: A History of the First Racially Integrated Hotel-Casino. McFarland. ISBN 978-0-7864-5251-4.
- Embry, Jessie L. (2013). Oral History, Community, and Work in the American West. University of Arizona Press. ISBN 978-0-8165-9927-1.
- Simich, Jerry L.; Wright, Thomas C. (2005). The Peoples of Las Vegas: One City, Many Faces. University of Nevada Press. ISBN 978-0-87417-616-2.
- White, Claytee D. (June 5, 1997). "Transcript of interview with Sarann Knight Preddy". Las Vegas, Nevada: University of Nevada Las Vegas. Archived from the original on September 23, 2015.
