= Cotton Club (Las Vegas) =

Historic defunct casino in Las Vegas, Nevada

- Interactive map of Cotton Club
- Address: 500 Jackson Avenue; Las Vegas, Nevada; United States

Construction
- Opened: 1944
- Closed: 1957

The Cotton Club was a club at 500 Jackson Avenue in the West Side of Las Vegas, Nevada, which was an exclusive club for African Americans.

== History ==
Established in late 1944 as a small bar by Moe Taub, it was one of the earliest Black clubs to legally operate away from Downtown Las Vegas. Sarann Knight-Preddy become a keno writer for the club, and in 1950 she became the first black woman to hold a gaming license in Nevada.

In July 1947 the Cotton Club was sold to Jodie Cannon, who resold it less than 6 months later to Uvalde Caperton, though Cannon stayed on as a manager. The original club was destroyed by an explosion and fire in May 1948. Caperton owned the club until 1957, when it closed.

== Later years ==
In 1969, Preddy put in a club with Margie Elliot called the Playhouse Lounge at the location. They were unable to obtain a gaming license and after a year, sold the business. It reopened from 1970 to 1985 as "Love's Cocktail Lounge".

== Bibliography ==
- McKee, Robert J. (27 February 2014). Community Action against Racism in West Las Vegas: The F Street Wall and the Women Who Brought It Down. Lexington Books. ISBN 978-0-7391-8678-7.
- Roman, James (2011). Chronicles of Old Las Vegas: Exposing Sin City's High-Stakes History. Museyon. ISBN 978-1-9384-5002-0.
- White, Claytee D. (June 5, 1997). "Transcript of interview with Sarann Knight Preddy". Las Vegas, Nevada: University of Nevada Las Vegas. Archived from the original on September 23, 2015.
