= Carson Valley Inn =

Hotel and casino in Nevada, United States

- Interactive map of Carson Valley Inn
- Location: Minden, Nevada, U.S.; 1627 U.S. Route 395; 38.95616°N 119.76792°W
- Opened: August 10, 1984; 41 years ago
- Theme: Rustic lodge
- Gaming space: 22,800 square feet (2,120 m^{2})
- Owner: Michael Pegram
- Architect: Worth Group
- Renovated in: 2009; 2010
- Website: carsonvalleyinn.com

Carson Valley Inn is a hotel and casino located in Minden, Nevada. It contains 22,800 square feet (2,120 m^{2}) of gaming space.

== History ==
Carson Valley Inn was initially founded by Patrick and Jeane Mulreany in 1984. From the beginning, the location functions as both a casino and a hotel. The Mulreanys exclusively operated Carson Valley Inn until 2009, when the hotel was acquired by Mike Pegram, who owned a local casino in Carson City called Bodines Casino, and the Carano family, who has a number of casinos in Reno, including Silver Legacy Resort Casino and Eldorado Hotel Casino.

Following this acquisition, the hotel underwent multiple renovations starting from 2009, which increased the number of rooms and facilities available alongside expanding existing. A steak restaurant that the Inn was known, Fiona, was also renamed CV Steak during this period.

== Facilities ==
Carson Valley Inn offers 24-hours access to their casino gaming rooms. In addition to their hotel rooms, the location also has a trailer park and motor lodge rooms. The hotel also has a convention center and a number of spa services, as well as a swimming pool.
