= El Morocco (West Las Vegas) =

Historic casino club in Las Vegas, Nevada

- Interactive map of El Morocco
- Address: 1322 North E. Street; Las Vegas, Nevada; United States
- Owner: Sarann Knight-Preddy

Construction
- Opened: 1945
- Closed: 1958

The El Morocco was a club at 1322 North E. Street on the West Side of Las Vegas, Nevada.

== History ==
It was opened in 1945 by Frank Wilson, who operated it as a bar with slot machines. Around 1948 it was closed briefly, possibly for hosting an interracial clientele, but soon reopened adding blackjack, craps and poker tables. In 1954, the crap dealer was Calvin Washington and Clarence Ray was the night manager.

The original business was destroyed by fire in 1955, but in 1957 when Sarann Knight-Preddy returned from Hawthorne, Nevada, where she had run the first club licensed to a black woman she went to work at the rebuilt El Morocco. The new owner ran the business from 1957 to 1958, but then it closed and the building was razed two years later due to vandalism which caused its condemnation by the city.

== New El Morocco ==
In 1959, the New El Morocco was built on the same site and opened on March 11. Oscar Crozier, one of the liaisons between the casino owners on the Las Vegas Strip and the National Association for the Advancement of Colored People (NAACP) was one of the new owners. He was unable to make a go of the business and it folded on February 9, 1960, before its first anniversary. Val Ruggerio reopened the New El Morocco on October 2, 1963, and was licensed for blackjack, craps, poker and slot machines. Ruggerio moved to Reno and closed the business on April 28, 1964.

== Sources ==
- Bracey, Earnest N. (2008). The Moulin Rouge and Black Rights in Las Vegas: A History of the First Racially Integrated Hotel-Casino. McFarland. ISBN 978-0-7864-5251-4.
- Embry, Jessie L. (2013). Oral History, Community, and Work in the American West. University of Arizona Press. ISBN 978-0-8165-9927-1.
- Roman, James (2011). Chronicles of Old Las Vegas: Exposing Sin City's High-Stakes History. New York, New York: Museyon. pp. 102–103. ISBN 978-1-938450-02-0.
- White, Claytee D. (June 5, 1997). "Transcript of interview with Sarann Knight Preddy". Las Vegas, Nevada: University of Nevada Las Vegas. Archived from the original on September 23, 2015.
