= 3rd Street Flats =

Mixed-use development and defunct Kings Inn hotel and casino

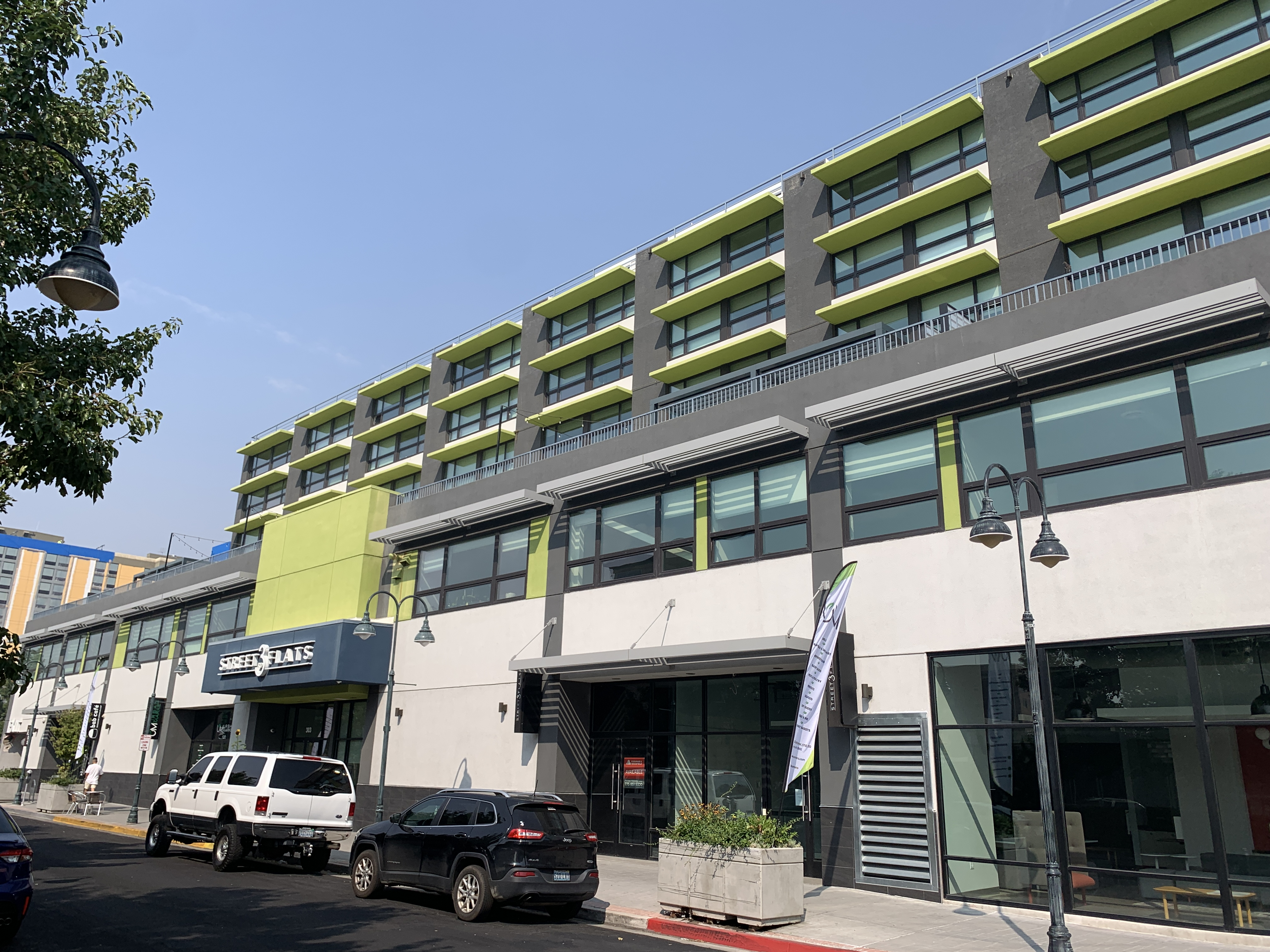
- Former names: Kings Inn

General information
- Type: Mixed-use
- Location: 303 West Third Street, Reno, Nevada, United States
- Coordinates: 39.528246°N 119.816954°W
- Construction started: 1973
- Topped-out: March 29, 1974
- Opened: September 1974 (Kings Inn hotel); August 1975 (Kings Inn casino); December 26, 2016 (3rd Street Flats)
- Renovated: 2015-16
- Owner: LandCap Investment Partners

Technical details
- Floor count: 7

Design and construction
- Developer: Bentar Development and Basin Street Properties (3rd Street Flats)

Renovating team
- Architects: BDE Architecture; KRI Architecture
- Engineer: Forbes Engineering
- Structural engineer: McElhaney Structural Engineers
- Main contractor: Bentar Development

Other information
- Number of units: 94

Website
- www.3rdstreetflatsreno.com

3rd Street Flats is a mixed-use development project located in downtown Reno, Nevada. It includes 94 apartment units, retail space, and a restaurant. It previously operated as Kings Inn, a hotel and casino. The hotel opened in September 1974, and the casino opened the next year. The casino closed in 1982, following financial issues, and the hotel closed on July 12, 1986, because of fire code violations. Although there were plans to reopen the building, it ultimately sat vacant for the next three decades.

In the 2000s, two separate plans were proposed to redevelop the building into residential units, with retail space on the ground floor. Neither plan materialized, due to financial problems. Reno mayor Bob Cashell considered the dilapidated building a major blight on the city and wanted it demolished. The building was eventually sold in 2014, and redeveloped as 3rd Street Flats. It opened to residential tenants on December 26, 2016.

== History ==
=== Early years ===
The Kings Inn was owned initially by three Reno businessmen: retired colonel Matthew Chotas, Joseph Fischer, and Bob Scoggin. The designer and building consultant was Ed Kenney and Associates. Excavation was underway in September 1973, after approximately a year of planning. The hotel was topped off on March 29, 1974. Four months later, California businessman Gust Mazoros filed a lawsuit against the owners, stating that he was owed $275,000 for helping to finance the project.

The Kings Inn was expected to open in August 1974, but construction was delayed for a month due to local trade union strikes. In September 1974, Allan Bergendahl, a California developer, became the majority owner of the Kings Inn. Chotas, Scoggin and Fischer retained a small interest. Bergendahl was the president of GMFC Inc., located in Downey, California. He had been interested in owning a hotel-casino in Reno since 1968.

Part of the hotel opened in early September 1974, and the remainder was finished at the end of the month. The restaurant was expected to be opened several weeks later, while the casino would take several months to finish. The seven-story Kings Inn hotel was part of the Best Western chain. It had 168 rooms, two floors of underground parking, and a third-floor pool for guests. It also had a 24-hour restaurant known as King Joe's, the Circle Bar, the King's Lounge, and live singing entertainment. Bergendahl applied for a gaming license to operate 150 slot machines and 12 table games. He received state approval in August 1975, and opened the casino that month. The casino lost $100 on its first night of operation.

Marshall P. Davis, a former minority owner of the Kings Inn, sued Bergendahl and the original trio of owners in 1976, for more than $40,000. Davis alleged that the trio, who were his business partners, had sold the Kings Inn without his approval and without compensating his interest in the property. In 1977, representatives from the NAACP joined a picketing at the Kings Inn, which had recently been accused of harassing black customers. In 1980, two lenders sued the Kings Inn for failure to make lease payments on equipment and furniture.

Financial problems pushed the property into Chapter 11 bankruptcy in June 1981. Sherwood & Roberts, a mortgage company, was owed $4 million after previously providing a construction loan for the project. The company proceeded with a foreclosure auction, and Bergendahl became the sole owner in May 1982, after bidding $3.95 million. The casino portion was closed that year, and the 152-room hotel was forced by the city to close on July 12, 1986, because of fire code violations. The closure was unexpected, and several guests had to be relocated. The hotel had previously received an extension two years earlier to deal with the issues, but a request for a second extension was denied. The hotel was expected to reopen once the violations were corrected. It was believed that a new sprinkler system could cost up to $70,000. Bergendahl died later in 1986, and his family inherited the Kings Inn.

=== Failed plans ===
An international marketing campaign was launched in 1989 to find a buyer for the Kings Inn, which was appraised at $6.2 million. The marketing efforts generated interest from several prospective buyers. An auction had been set for the Kings Inn, but it was put on hold after a potential buyer expressed interest in the property. Ownership ultimately remained with Bergendahl's family; in 1992, they had plans to reopen the Kings Inn. Such plans did not materialize, and the building came to be considered an eyesore. GMFC did not respond to violations regarding the condition of the building, and in 1997, the Reno City Council voted to place a nearly $12,000 lien on the property. The cost would pay to have the building painted and repaired, in order to repel vagrants.

In 2000, GMFC sold the Kings Inn to Nationwide Capital Services, based in Oakland, California. The company paid $3.2 million for the Kings Inn and paid an additional $500,000 in delinquent property taxes. The company began studying possible uses for the building, with the intention of reusing rather than demolishing it. The company decided to include residential space on the upper floors and a restaurant and retail space on the ground floor. No casino space was planned. The company hoped to begin and finish construction in 2001. These plans also did not materialize, as Nationwide faced financial problems.

Early into Bob Cashell's first term as Reno mayor, he focused on the Kings Inn and its building code violations. At the end of 2002, Cashell included the Kings Inn on his list of blighted properties that needed to be cleaned up. The city intended to acquire the building for an upcoming train trench project. The property's underground parking would be used to replace other parking that would become inaccessible during trench construction. By early 2003, Nationwide had entered bankruptcy, complicating the city's plan to condemn the building for its trench project. The city wanted to proceed with acquiring the Kings Inn through eminent domain, but was unable to do so while it was in ongoing bankruptcy proceedings, thus preventing the city from taking action to condemn it. In 2004, Cashell named the Kings Inn as the top blight in the city and said that immediate action was required, calling the building a danger to the public: "It's life threatening. You've got windows broken out. You've got people living in there."

GMFC regained ownership of the Kings Inn later in 2004, and the company had various ideas for redeveloping it. In June 2005, GMFC transferred ownership to a joint partnership with North River Development, a company based in the San Francisco Bay Area. The companies had plans to convert the building into condominiums. The building would be gutted and rebuilt, and five additional floors would be added. The final project would feature 99 condominium units, and retail space on the ground floor. In January 2006, the Reno Planning Commission approved new plans for a total of 130 condominiums. The plan would include the addition of eight stories to the existing seven-story building. Asbestos would need to be removed from the original building before its interior could be stripped down. In addition to the retail space, the developers also considered adding a grocery store to the first floor.

The redeveloped building would be known as DeNovo. The project's architectural firm was Cathexes, a Reno-based company. James Molder, senior project manager of Cathexes, said the additional floors would not be an issue thanks to the building's concrete columns: "Structurally, this building is in great shape even though it looks terrible from the street level. Our tests have determined it has excellent load-bearing capacity. We will need to expand the size of some of the footings, but the builders of this back in the 1970s did a really solid job." Unit pricing would range between approximately $200,000 and $1 million. Much of the interior would be rebuilt, and the building would implement green features such as recycled carpet, solar panels, and energy efficient lighting.

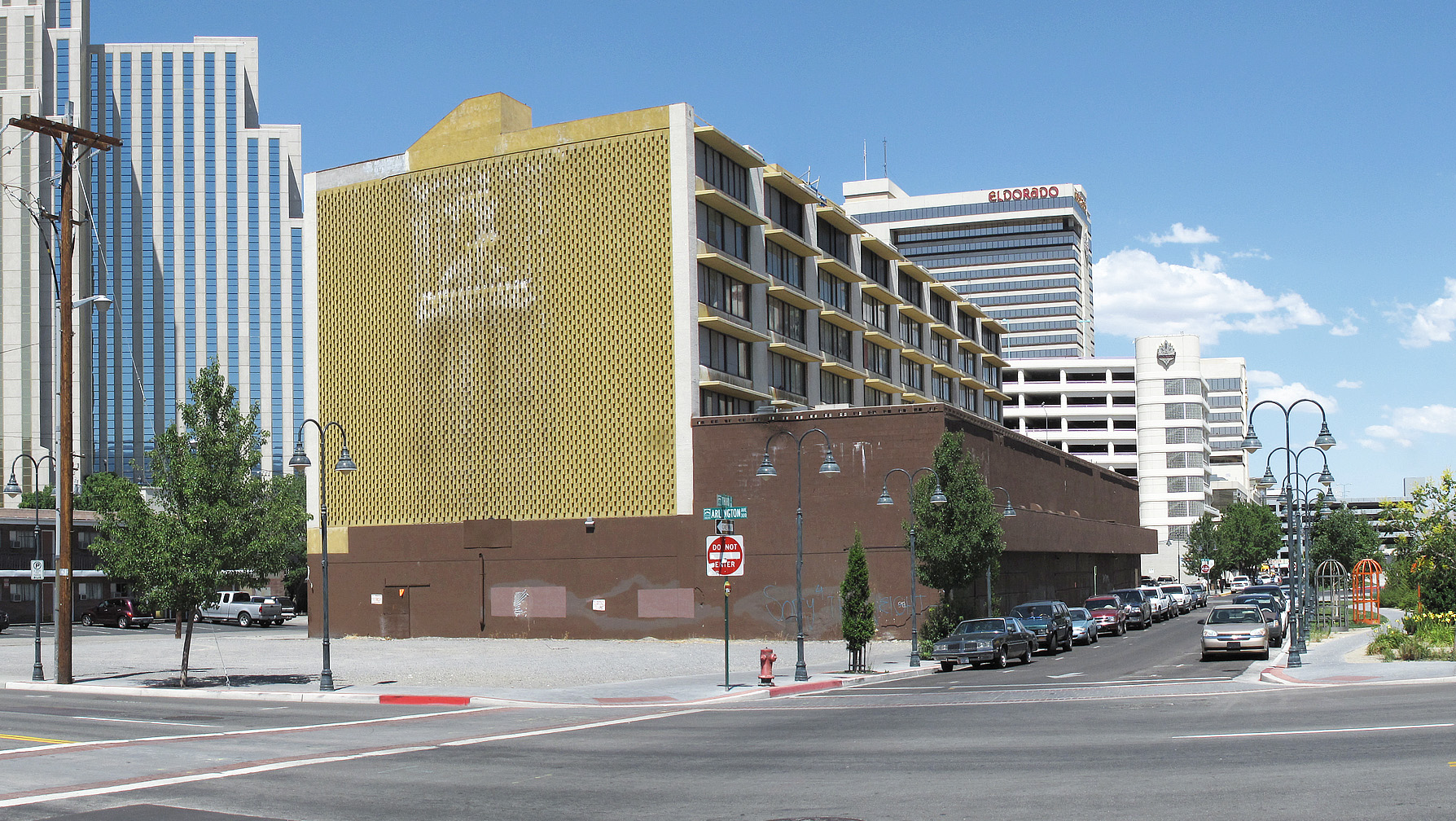
Kings Inn, July 2012

Interior demolition and asbestos removal was underway in February 2006. New construction for DeNovo was scheduled to begin in March 2007, with the first residential units scheduled for completion in mid-2008. Full completion was expected in 2009. North River Development received a $3.5 million loan for the project from Integrated Financial Associates, based in Las Vegas. North River Development defaulted on the loan in 2007, before construction began. In 2009, the Reno City Council expressed interest in paying off the delinquent property taxes and purchasing the Kings Inn.

In 2011, the Kings Inn was sold through a trustee sale to Integrated Financial Associates for $500,000. More than $360,000 was owed in delinquent and current property taxes. George Flint, a lobbyist for the Nevada Brothel Association, suggested in 2012 that the local government legalize prostitution and use the Kings Inn as a red-light district. The idea never materialized. As Cashell neared the end of his final mayoral term in 2014, he said, "I guess I'm real sorry the King's Inn is still standing. I've wanted to drive a bulldozer through the front of that thing since I took office."

=== Redevelopment ===
Amador Bengochea announced in July 2014 that he was in the process of purchasing the Kings Inn, with plans to add a residential component to the facility. Bengochea was a Las Vegas developer and the owner of Bentar Development. Bengochea said, "I was just driving by here and it looked like a real interesting building. A lot of people won't even touch this place, but I think I can do a real good job with it." Bengochea said the concrete building had "good bones" and that he did not want it to go to waste. He said that it "looked like a solid building. It would be a challenge (to clean up) but it did seem to be worth preserving. The city of Reno wanted to level it." The Reno City Council gave tentative approval to Bengochea's request for public financing, to redevelop the building as affordable housing. It was later announced that First Independent Bank financed the project. Bengochea's purchase was finalized in November 2014, at a cost of $1.35 million.

Bengochea partnered with a Reno company, Basin Street Properties, to redevelop the Kings Inn as 3rd Street Flats, an upscale 94-unit apartment building. The target demographic would consist of professionals in their late 20s and early 30s. The project would also include restaurant, retail and grocery space on the ground floor. The building interior was stripped down throughout 2015, with new construction beginning at the end of the year. Among the extensive clean-up work was the removal of asbestos from the building. The interior of the Kings Inn had also been infested with pigeons. The conversion of the building into apartments was part of an effort to revitalize the downtown area. The cost of the conversion was expected to be $10 million, with completion initially scheduled for mid-2016.

3rd Street Flats opened to residential tenants on December 26, 2016. The building was redeveloped with technologically advanced features, such as USB plugs in each unit. Reno mayor Hillary Schieve praised the redevelopment of the building. The property includes 9,000 sq ft (840 m^{2}) of retail space, a pet-grooming facility, and a fenced-in courtyard with a dog park. A neon sign from the former casino, depicting a king's crown, was installed in the new facility's tenant lounge to honor the building's past history. In 2017, the project won a Summit Award for "Mixed-Use Development of the Year".

3rd Street Flats includes three retail spaces on the ground floor. Bab Café, a South Korean restaurant chain, opened its first U.S. location in one of the spaces on May 1, 2017. Bentar Development and Basin Street Properties sold the building in July 2017. LandCap Investment Partners, a mixed-used and housing investment firm, purchased it for $18.5 million. At the time, the apartment units were 90 percent occupied. Three months after the sale, a 2,700 sq ft (250 m^{2}) convenience store known as The Urban Market opened to the public in one of the ground-floor spaces.
