= Moulin Rouge Hotel =

Casino hotel in Las Vegas, Nevada

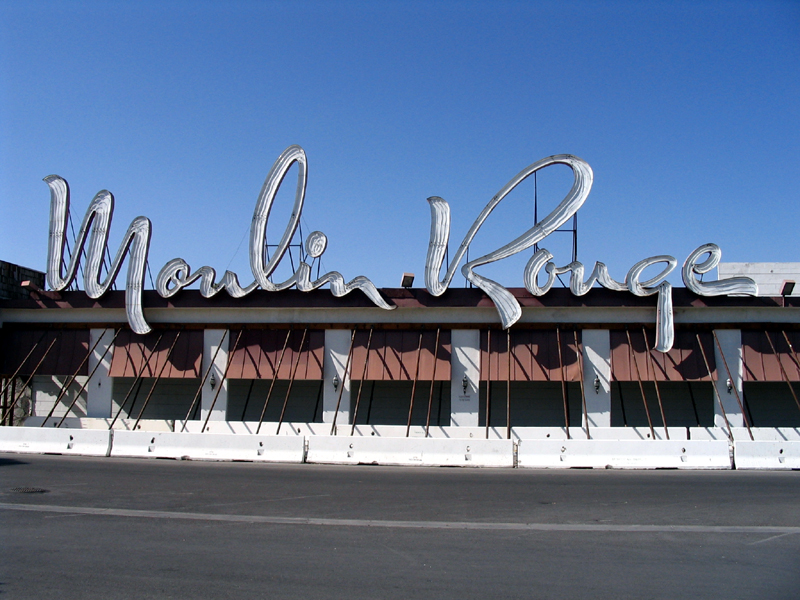
- Moulin Rouge sign, c. 2006

- Location within Downtown Las Vegas Location within Nevada
- Interactive map of Moulin Rouge Hotel
- Location: Las Vegas; 900 West Bonanza Road; 36°10′42″N 115°09′13″W
- Opened: May 24, 1955
- Closed: October 1955
- No. of rooms: 116
- Gaming space: 8,925 sq ft (829.2 m^{2})
- Casino type: Land-Based
- Owner: Sarann Knight-Preddy
- Architect: Zick & Sharp
- Moulin Rouge Hotel
- U.S. National Register of Historic Places
- Architectural style: "Googie-populuxe" Modernist
- NRHP reference No.: 92001701
- Added to NRHP: 1992

The Moulin Rouge Hotel was a short-lived hotel and casino in West Las Vegas, Nevada, that was listed on the U.S. National Register of Historic Places in 1992. Although its peak operation lasted only six months in the second half of 1955, it was the first desegregated hotel casino and was popular with many of the Black entertainers of the time, who would entertain at the other hotels and casinos and stay at the Moulin Rouge.

The hotel was named after the Paris nightclub of the same name.

== History ==
=== Founding ===
Cover of Life magazine, June 20, 1955, featuring Tropi Can Can dancers. Photographed by Loomis Dean.

In the 1950s, almost all of the casinos in Downtown Las Vegas and the Strip were totally segregated—off limits to Black people unless they were the entertainment or labor force. It was during this era that Vester Heath saw the need for an integrated hotel. A group of White investors, led by Will Max Schwartz (38% ownership share), including Louis Rubin (29% share), owner of Chandler's Restaurant in New York City, and Alexander Bisno (31% share), who worked in real estate in California financed and opened the Moulin Rouge at a cost of $3.5 million. Famed Black boxer Joe Louis was brought in with a small ownership share (2%) to serve as the official host. Its 900 West Bonanza Road site placed it in a prime location between downtown, which served a predominantly White audience, and the segregated Black neighborhood of West Las Vegas.

25 of 27 applicants (including Rubin and Louis) were granted gambling licenses by the state of Nevada to operate the hotel-casino in early May 1955, and the Moulin Rouge opened on May 24, 1955, on a 15 acres (6.1 ha) site. It was the first integrated hotel casino in the United States. The building was designed by local architects Walter Zick and Harris Sharp.

=== Operating and direction ===
When it opened, the Moulin Rouge was fully integrated top to bottom, from employees to patrons to entertainers.

The hotel made the June 20, 1955, cover of Life magazine, with a photo of two showgirls. Notable performers regularly showed to party until dawn. Prominent Black singers and musicians such as Lena Horne, Sammy Davis Jr., Louis Armstrong, Sarah Vaughan, Nat King Cole, Duke Ellington, Dorothy Dandridge, Harry Belafonte, Pearl Bailey, Lionel Hampton, and Count Basie would perform often. Many of these artists were banned from gambling or staying at the hotels on the Strip. In addition, White performers, including George Burns, Jeanette MacDonald, Tallulah Bankhead, Judy Garland, Marlene Dietrich, Frankie Laine, Maurice Chevalier, Zsa Zsa Gabor, Jack Benny, Sophie Tucker and Frank Sinatra, would drop in after their shows to gamble and perform. Eventually management added a 2:30am "Third Show" to accommodate the crowds.

=== Closure and landmarking ===
In October 1955 the doors of the Moulin Rouge were padlocked and the casino was closed. According to Michael Green, professor of history at Southern Nevada university: “In the end I think four factors sank the Moulin Rouge: bad management, bad location, bad timing and bad luck.” By December 1955, the casino had filed for bankruptcy, which was granted the following March. Nevertheless, to maintain its gaming license, the Moulin Rouge (like many closed properties) operates on a temporary basis for a state-mandated minimum of eight hours every two years. For example, video poker machines were trucked in for a day on June 19, 2012, June 11, 2014, May 29, 2018, and May 14, 2024.

The hotel was leased separately and kept operating after the closure of the casino. Leo Frey purchased and reopened the resort in 1957, but it continued with limited services in the years afterward and the showroom was closed for 22 years. Other limited operations included the hotel building being used for a public housing apartment complex and souvenir retail. In 1992 the property was listed on the City of Las Vegas Historic Property Register and the National Register of Historic Places as a symbol of expanding Black civil rights and a monument of Las Vegas's past.

=== Civil-rights heritage ===
Front-of-the-house Black workers (dancers, dealers, and waiters) failed to get hired at other casinos after the Moulin Rouge closed in October 1955. Segregation continued as part of normal Las Vegas operations. In one incident in the late 1950s, ex-Moulin Rouge dancer Anna Bailey was part of a group of Black women who went to the Sands to watch Frank Sinatra perform; after being stopped by security and denied entry, Sinatra himself escorted them into the lounge and seated them at his private table. The short but vibrant life of the Moulin Rouge helped the Civil Rights Movement in Las Vegas. Many of those who enjoyed and were employed by the hotel became activists and supporters. The hotel was also the spark needed to bring an end to segregation on the Strip.

Bob Bailey, the former emcee at the Moulin Rouge, and his wife Anna, a dancer in the show, became friends with local civil rights leaders, including Drs. Charles West and James McMillan, the first Black doctor and dentist in Las Vegas, respectively. In 1960, under threat of a protest march down the Las Vegas Strip against racial discrimination by Las Vegas casinos, a meeting was hurriedly arranged by then-Governor Grant Sawyer between hotel owners, city and state officials, local Black leaders, and Dr. McMillan, then serving as president of the local NAACP. The meeting was held on March 26 at the closed Moulin Rouge. This resulted in an agreement to desegregate all Strip casinos. Hank Greenspun, who would become the publisher of the Las Vegas Sun, mediated the agreement.

=== Preservation and fires ===
Frey instituted a policy of charging Black patrons more for drinks than White patrons, for which his liquor license was revoked in 1960, 1961, and 1962. Ironically, with the ending of segregation in Las Vegas with the Moulin Rouge Agreements of 1960, westside businesses and the Moulin Rouge itself suffered, as Black patrons were no longer limited to segregated businesses. For a while the hotel was owned by the first African American woman to hold a Nevada Gaming License, Sarann Knight-Preddy, who first leased the site in 1985, then purchased it for approximately $2 million from Leo Frey in 1989.

Although the Moulin Rouge complex remained shuttered for decades, many failed plans were hatched to rebuild and reopen the cultural landmark. But on May 29, 2003, a fire gutted the complex. The facade, with its signature stylized name was spared destruction. In 2004, a man arrested near the property was sentenced to four years in prison after pleading guilty to one count of arson in connection with the fire.

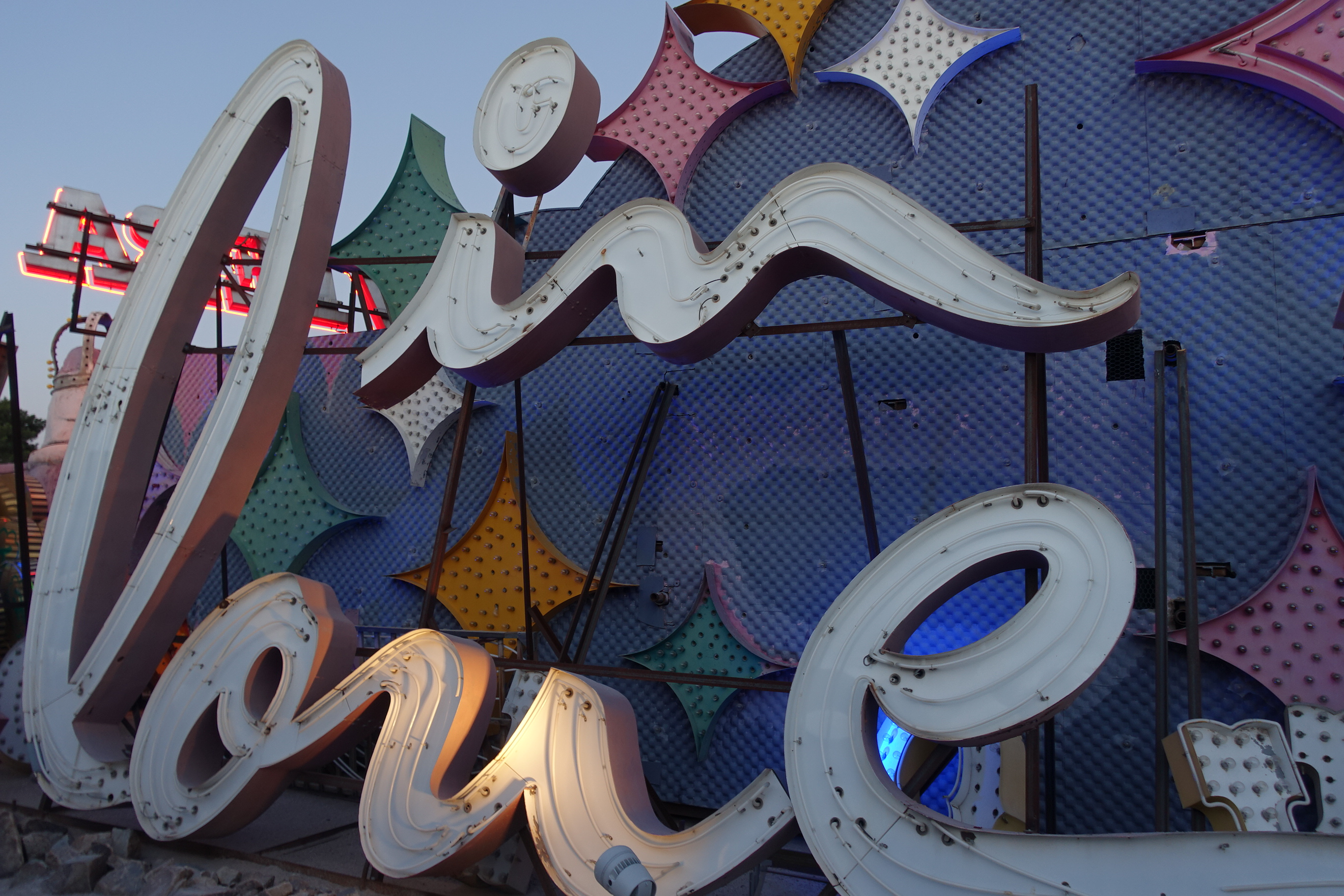
Moulin Rouge sign at the Neon Museum rearranged to read "in love" (2017)

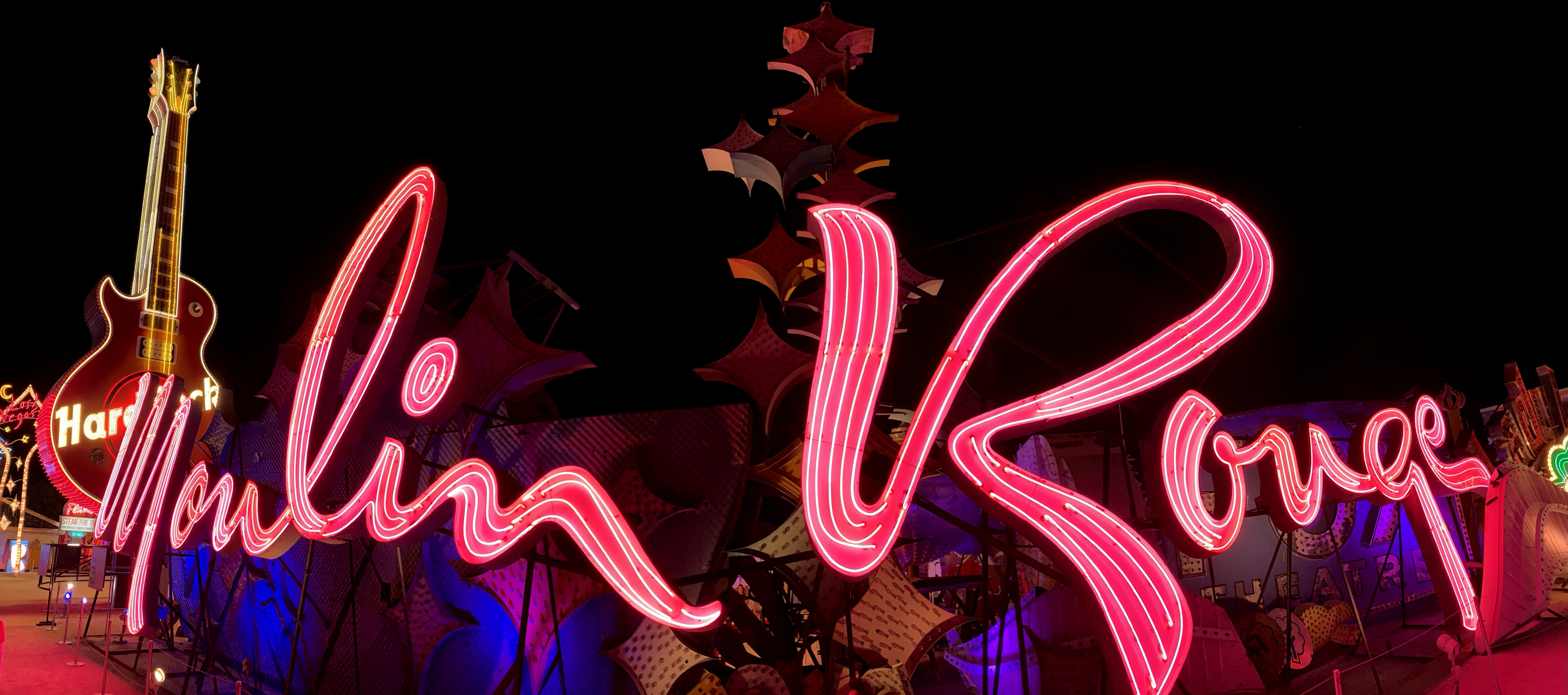
Moulin Rouge sign and Hard Rock Hotel and Casino guitar sign at the Neon Museum (2021)

January 2004 saw the Moulin Rouge sold again for $12.1 million to the Moulin Rouge Development Corporation. The stylized "Moulin Rouge" neon marquee sign was turned back on. A $200 million renovation of the site was announced but was never completed; the site was rezoned to allow two onsite towers with 1,727 hotel rooms and a 72,596 ft^{2} (6,744.4 m^{2}) casino, along with space for a restaurant/bar, offices, retail, meeting spaces, performing arts, and a wedding chapel. The two planned towers would have reached 300 and 420 ft (91 and 128 m) in height, each sheathed in a "multi-toned red curtain wall". Instead, the developers went bankrupt in 2008 and a receiver was appointed for the property.

Following a February 2009 decision to tear down the structures as a public nuisance, the third fire in four years on May 6 of that year caused significant damage to the original hotel lobby building, but did not touch the remaining original exterior wall that held the script marquee. The signage had just been removed for storage at the Neon Museum boneyard. The property, which was in foreclosure at the time of the fire, had failed to sell at a foreclosure auction the day before.

In June 2010, the Las Vegas Historic Preservation Commission approved permits for demolition of the remains of the buildings, citing numerous concerns by the city about the safety of the structures. Instead of demolishing what was left of the hotel wings, which had seemed to catch fire every few years, the city instead demolished the stone exterior wall, pillar, and facade that held the marquee sign. Also destroyed was the landmark tower that stood over the West side and was a symbol to the residents. The tower, which the city claimed was unstable, took nearly half a day of weakening to finally pull down. In February 2011, the red mosaic pillars still laid in the empty lot, and the unstable, fire hazard hotel wings still stood.

In 2017, the receiver awarded Clark County the right to redevelop the Moulin Rouge site, but the county withdrew its bid after an outcry from neighborhood residents over the proposed reuse, a government building. The demolition of the remaining hotel buildings was approved in August and carried out in October of that year after a final fire. In July 2019 a bid by a local group called Moulin Rouge LLC to develop a new hotel, casino, and convention center complex was accepted; a bid by a rival group also proposed a new casino and hotel.

As of 2020, only the sign frame remains. The site is totally flat. It was sold to BBC Capital, a private equity investment firm based in Australia, in November 2020, for $3.1 million. The firm plans to build a casino on the site. The Southern Nevada Regional Housing Authority has expressed an interest in acquiring the northern parcel to develop market rate housing integrated with the Marble Manor development.

== Design ==
The complex itself consisted of two "Googie-populuxe" Modernist style stuccoed buildings that housed the hotel, the casino, and a theater: a single-story casino/theater building was attached to a two-story vee-shaped hotel building to its west, enclosing a courtyard formed by the hotel building and the west wall of the casino/theater. The exterior had a 60 ft long (18 m) neon sign with the hotel's name in stylized cursive writing and murals depicting dancing and fancy cars. The marquee and roadside signs were designed by Betty Willis, creator of the "Welcome to Las Vegas" sign at the south end of the Strip.

=== Setting and theme ===
The hotel was located in West Las Vegas, where the black population lived. West Las Vegas was bounded by Washington Avenue on the north, Bonanza Road on the south, H Street on the west, and A Street on the east. The establishment was a model of eye-catching, 110 rooms, a gorgeous showroom, swimming pool, restaurant/coffee shop, dress-shop, and bar which was constructed of highly polished and expensive hardwoods.

The Moulin Rouge in Paris was a primary source of inspiration. When the casino opened, Clarence Robinson produced the floor show which concluded with the "Tropi Can Can", inspired by the French Cancan. The original was created in the 19th century to the Moulin Rouge Paris. This inspiration comes from the first Afro-American star in France, Josephine Baker.

Other references to Paris included:

- The Eiffel Tower appears vertically on the sign of the establishment, and also on the casino chips,
- A French Chef was at the head of the largest gastronomic restaurant of the establishments
- From the entrance, security personnel were dressed in the uniform of the French Foreign Legion as allusion to France and Edith Piaf, who made a comeback after the war with Yves Montand at the Moulin Rouge. According to the press, this added a touch of glamour in Las Vegas.
