= Aztec Inn =

Motel and casino in Nevada, United States

- Interactive map of Aztec Inn
- Location: Las Vegas, Nevada; 2200 South Las Vegas Boulevard; 36.1461136°N 115.15646119999996°W
- Opened: 1957
- Theme: Aztec
- No. of rooms: 45
- Gaming space: 3,120 sq ft (290 m^{2})
- Casino type: Land-based
- Owner: Gerald Brinkman; Paul Kellogg; Gary Vause
- Previous names: Sun N Shine Motel; Sunshine Motel; Mojave Meadow Motel
- Renovated in: 1958; 1960; 1991

Aztec Inn (also known as the Aztec Gold Inn & Casino) is a motel and casino located on 0.89 acres (0.36 ha) of land at 2200 South Las Vegas Boulevard, north of the Las Vegas Strip, in Las Vegas, Nevada. The property is located south of the Stratosphere hotel-casino, and includes a nearby apartment complex connected to the Aztec Inn.

The property began in 1957, as the Sun N Shine Motel. It became the Sunshine Motel in the 1980s, and later became known as the Mojave Meadow Motel. A casino was added in 1991, when the property was renamed the Aztec Inn. The property is owned by Gerald Brinkman, Paul Kellogg, and Gary Vause. The Aztec Inn's casino is 3,120 sq ft (290 m^{2}) and features 39 slot machines. The Aztec Inn also features a buffet and a business center.

== History ==
=== Early history (1957–2000) ===
The Aztec Inn's various apartment buildings were constructed on the property in 1953, 1954, and 1956. The motel structure was constructed in 1957, and operated as the Sun N Shine Motel. Additional rooms were added in 1958 and 1960. The motel became the Sunshine Motel during the 1980s, and was later renamed as the Mojave Meadow Motel. In 1991, a casino was built and opened as the Aztec Inn. The motel's office was demolished to make room for the casino. During the 1990s, the property was owned by Gerald D. Brinkman, Gary Vause, Donald Dombrowski, and Paul Kellogg III.

In 1994, officials from the Stratosphere project – under construction north of the Aztec Inn – entered an agreement with the city's Las Vegas Redevelopment Agency to have the Aztec Inn's parking lot condemned through eminent domain and turned over to the Stratosphere. The Aztec Inn's owners had spent $700,000 on renovations and feared that the loss of their parking lot would end the business. In June 1995, a judge ruled that the agreement was unconstitutional. The city chose not to appeal the decision. By April 1996, the Aztec Inn settled with the Stratosphere and agreed to sell its parking lot for an undisclosed amount.

Darrin Race, an Elvis Presley impersonator, regularly performed in front of the Aztec Inn during the 1990s. In December 1998, Brinkman, who owned a 25-percent interest in the Aztec Inn, sued Kellogg and Vause, accusing them and Dombrowski of making numerous high-interest loans to the Aztec Inn and later having the casino repay the loans against Brinkman's objections. Brinkman alleged that the loans violated the Aztec Inn's limited partnership agreement, which required unanimous consent of all loan transactions. Brinkman alleged that the Aztec Inn had lost $1.7 million since its opening in 1991, as a result of the loans. The lawsuit claimed that the casino had lost $217,000 in 1996, $418,000 in 1997 and $474,000 through the first ten months of 1998.

Michael Mushkin, an attorney defending the Aztec Inn's owners, claimed, "Mr. Brinkman has also made loans and received the same rate of interest on loans as these partners have." Brinkman requested a judge to place the Aztec Inn into receivership to recoup his investment money. Mushkin doubted that the casino would be forced into receivership. Aztec Inn's general manager, Bill Maxwell, criticized Brinkman, saying, "The three partners are supporting the company. The fourth partner is not." In March 1999, Maxwell was approved for a four-percent interest in the Aztec Inn. That month, Brinkman was in negotiations with the other co-owners to settle the lawsuit.

=== Recent history (2000–present) ===
At approximately 3:50 a.m. on May 10, 2000, a 33-year-old woman was driving south on South Las Vegas Boulevard when another driver cut her off. The woman swerved, lost control of her Mercedes-Benz, smashed through the Aztec Inn's glass doors, and crashed into the casino and bar area. Five people were injured. At least 15 slot machines – each one costing approximately $8,000 – were damaged. Four touchscreen slot machines – each one costing approximately $12,000 – were also damaged. One slot machine was hit hard enough by the woman's vehicle to be thrown across the casino, smashing into a wall. The casino's floor was covered in coins and glass shards. Paul Lybarger, the shift manager at the time, said, "I'm still surprised that no one was killed." The motel remained open, while the bar and slot machine area were expected to be reopened by early June 2000.

In January 2001, a flash fire occurred in one of the motel rooms and injured two people. In June 2004, Maxwell was approved to sell his four-percent stake to Dombrowski and Vause for $100,000. In January 2005, the casino agreed to correct discrepancies after being warned of violations in its internal control accounting procedures. In June 2005, state agents found repeated violations, which included underreporting slot machine winnings by $38,218. Other violations included improper recording of supply purchases, an improperly tested coin counter, and the allowance of a bartender to have a $2,000 bankroll to make gaming payouts that were not recorded in the casino's accounting system.

A fire forced the evacuation of the motel on June 22, 2005, at approximately 11:45 p.m. The fire was confined to a closet in a motel room, and was extinguished with no injuries. Another motel fire, involving a flaming mattress, occurred in July 2005. On the night of August 3, 2005, a three-alarm fire broke out on the western portion of the Aztec Inn, on the second floor of the two-story wood-frame motel, located on Baltimore Avenue. The casino was evacuated. Firefighters arrived at approximately 11:38 p.m. More than 100 firefighters spent 45 minutes to get the fire under control. Traffic on South Las Vegas Boulevard, between Sahara Avenue and St. Louis Avenue, was diverted to make way for firefighters.

The fire was mostly located inside the motel's attic. Aside from the attic, two motel rooms and a stairwell were also damaged by the fire, which caused an estimated $200,000 in damages. The motel was vacant prior to the fire, as it was undergoing renovations. It was the worst of the three fires that the Aztec Inn suffered that year, although officials determined that they were unrelated to each other. Fire investigators wanted to determine if renovations on the building were related to the fire. Smoke clouds drifted south along the Las Vegas Strip into the early morning hours.

In May 2006, the Aztec Inn was fined $5,000 after Dombrowski admitted to the accounting violations from the previous year.
