= Town Tavern (Las Vegas) =

Club in Nevada, United States

- Interactive map of Town Tavern
- Address: 600 Jackson Avenue; Las Vegas, Nevada; United States

Construction
- Opened: July 5, 1955
- Closed: 2013

Town Tavern was a bar and casino located at 600 West Jackson Avenue on the West Side of Las Vegas, Nevada. It was later known as New Town Tavern, and Ultra New Town Tavern, operating from 1955 to 2013.

== History ==
Earl Turmon opened Town Tavern on July 5, 1955. In the late 1950s the club was known as a destination for Black entertainers who were headlining shows at segregated Las Vegas Strip hotels. Louis Armstrong, Pearl Bailey, Dorothy Dandridge, Sammy Davis Jr, Cab Calloway, The Ink Spots, and Little Milton are among the performers who were dropped in and/or performed at the club.

On July 6, 1959, the business changed owners and was renamed the New Town Tavern. Its name changed again in the 1990s to Ultra New Town Tavern. New owners advertised that they had 36 slot machines and 2 gaming tables. After its final closure in 2013, another owner changed its rooftop sign to "Tokyo Casino" but the club never reopened under this name. The closed club was destroyed by fire on October 15, 2023.

== Sources ==
- Blue, Helen M.; Coughtry, Jamie (1991). "CLARENCE RAY Black Politics and Gaming in Las Vegas, 1920s-1980s" (PDF). University of Nevada Oral History Program. Reno, NV: University of Nevada: 83.
- Bracey, Earnest N. (2008). The Moulin Rouge and Black Rights in Las Vegas: A History of the First Racially Integrated Hotel-Casino. McFarland. ISBN 978-0-7864-5251-4.
- Embry, Jessie L. (2013). Oral History, Community, and Work in the American West. University of Arizona Press. ISBN 978-0-8165-9927-1.
- Hershwitzky, Patricia (2011). West Las Vegas. Charleston, South Carolina: Arcadia Publishing. ISBN 978-0-7385-8196-5.
- McKee, Robert J. (2014). Community Action against Racism in West Las Vegas: The F Street Wall and the Women Who Brought It Down. Lanham, Maryland: Lexington Books. ISBN 978-0-7391-8678-7.
- White, Claytee D. (June 5, 1997). "Transcript of interview with Sarann Knight Preddy". Las Vegas, Nevada: University of Nevada Las Vegas. Archived from the original on September 23, 2015.
