= Carson Nugget =

Hotel and casino in Carson City, Nevada

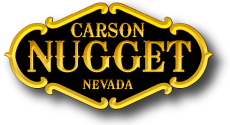

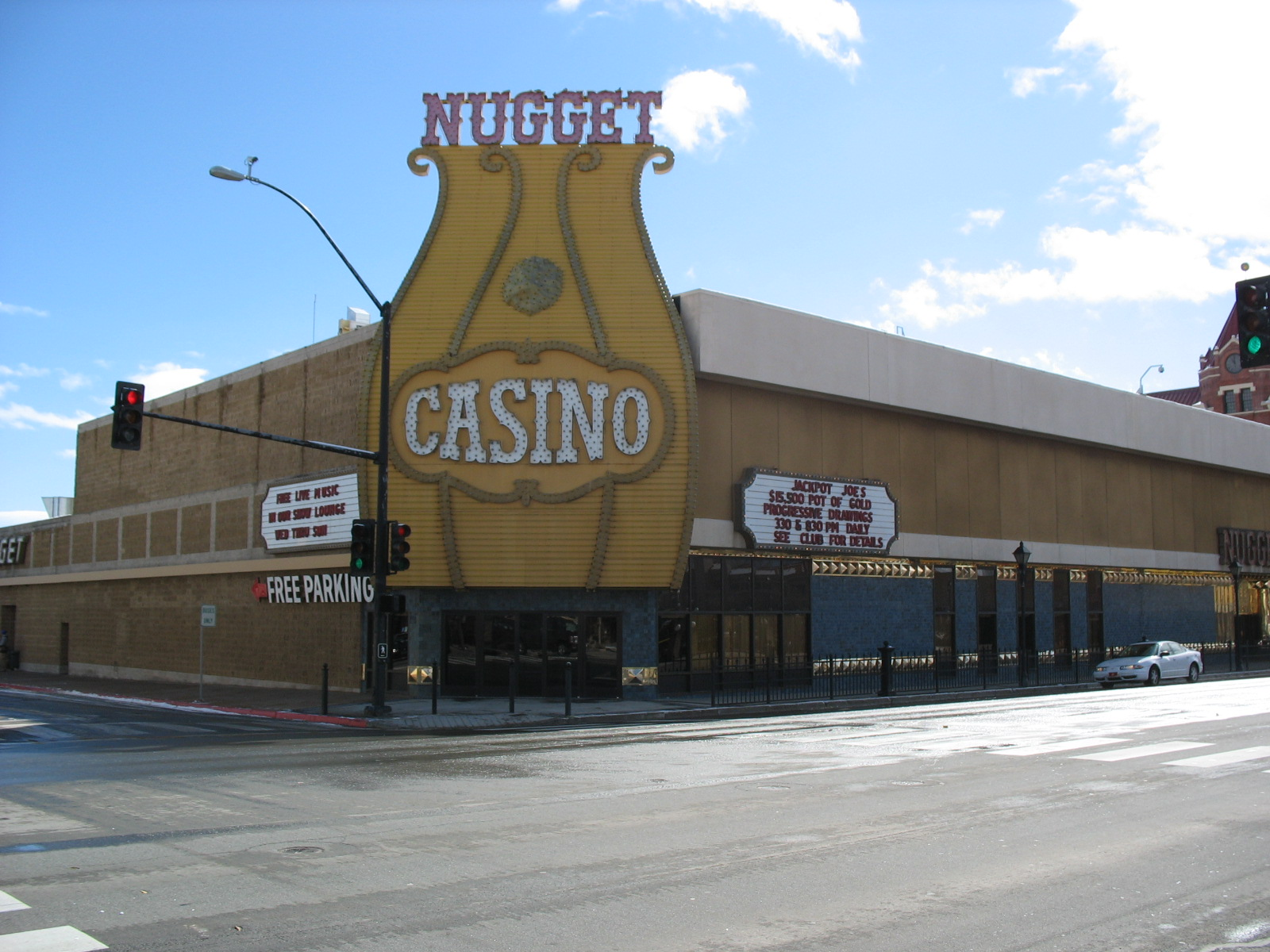
- Carson Nugget in 2009
- Interactive map of Carson Nugget
- Location: Carson City, Nevada, U.S.; 507 North Carson Street (casino) 800 North Carson Street (hotel); 39°10′00.6″N 119°45′59.3″W
- Opened: March 1, 1954; 72 years ago
- No. of rooms: 83
- Gaming space: 28,930 sq ft (2,688 m^{2})
- Notable restaurants: Alatte Coffee & Wine; The All American Eatery; Angelina's Steakhouse
- Owner: Dean DiLullo
- Website: ccnugget.com

Carson Nugget is a hotel and casino located in Carson City, Nevada. The Carson Nugget is nearly 30,000 square feet. The property features slots, table games, keno, three restaurants, meeting spaces and 83 hotel rooms.

== History ==
Richard Graves opened the casino, known then as the Carson City Nugget, on March 1, 1954. The Carson City Nugget was one of Nevada's largest and most prosperous casinos when Graves sold it to Richard E. Pogue and Chester H. Armstrong in September 1956. After Pogue died, the Carson City Nugget was sold to a group of six purchasers for $525,000 in December 1958. The group included three Adams brothers who would manage the casino.

As of 2008, the Carson Nugget had become the oldest continually operating casino in Carson City. The casino was sold in 2015 to Dean DiLullo, the CEO of M1 Gaming in Reno. The casino and restaurants occupy nearly 30,000-square-foot (2,800 m^{2}) and an 83-room hotel, the Carson Tahoe Hotel, is located across North Carson Street.

=== Awful Awful Burger ===
Graves opened multiple "Nugget" casinos, including the Little Nugget in Reno, and the Nugget Casino Resort in Sparks. At each of these locations, he introduced the "Awful Awful Burger", a double-patty sandwich that he had first created and sold in Idaho. The Awful Awful Burger, named so because it is considered "awful big and awful good", has come to be something of a local delicacy. As of September 2020, the Carson Nugget is the only remaining purveyor of the burger.
