= Max Casino =

Casino hotel in Nevada, United States

Coordinates: 39°9′30″N 119°46′3″W

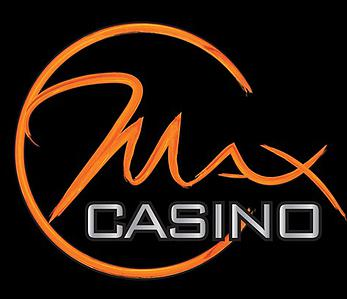
- Interactive map of Max Casino
- Location: Carson City, Nevada, U.S.; 900 South Carson Street
- Opened: 1972; 54 years ago
- Theme: Modern
- No. of rooms: 91
- Gaming space: 12,250 sq ft (1,138 m^{2})
- Notable restaurants: Black Bear Diner
- Owner: 777 Gaming
- Previous names: Carson Station (1972–2015)
- Renovated in: 2015
- Website: maxcasinocc.com

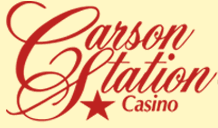
Former logo.

Max Casino (formerly the Carson Station), is a hotel and casino located in Carson City, Nevada. The Max Casino contains 12,250 square feet (1,138 m^{2}) of casino gambling space with more than 200 slot machines and 91 balcony hotel rooms. Formerly owned by Clark Russell, the Max Casino and Hotel has been owned and operated by 777 Gaming since 2011.The Max Casino has a wide variety of slot machines and video poker machines. The casino offers live entertainment every weekend, Black Bear Diner, and a full service sports book lounge operated by William Hill, a major Nevada and international sportsbook company.
