= Sports in Florida =

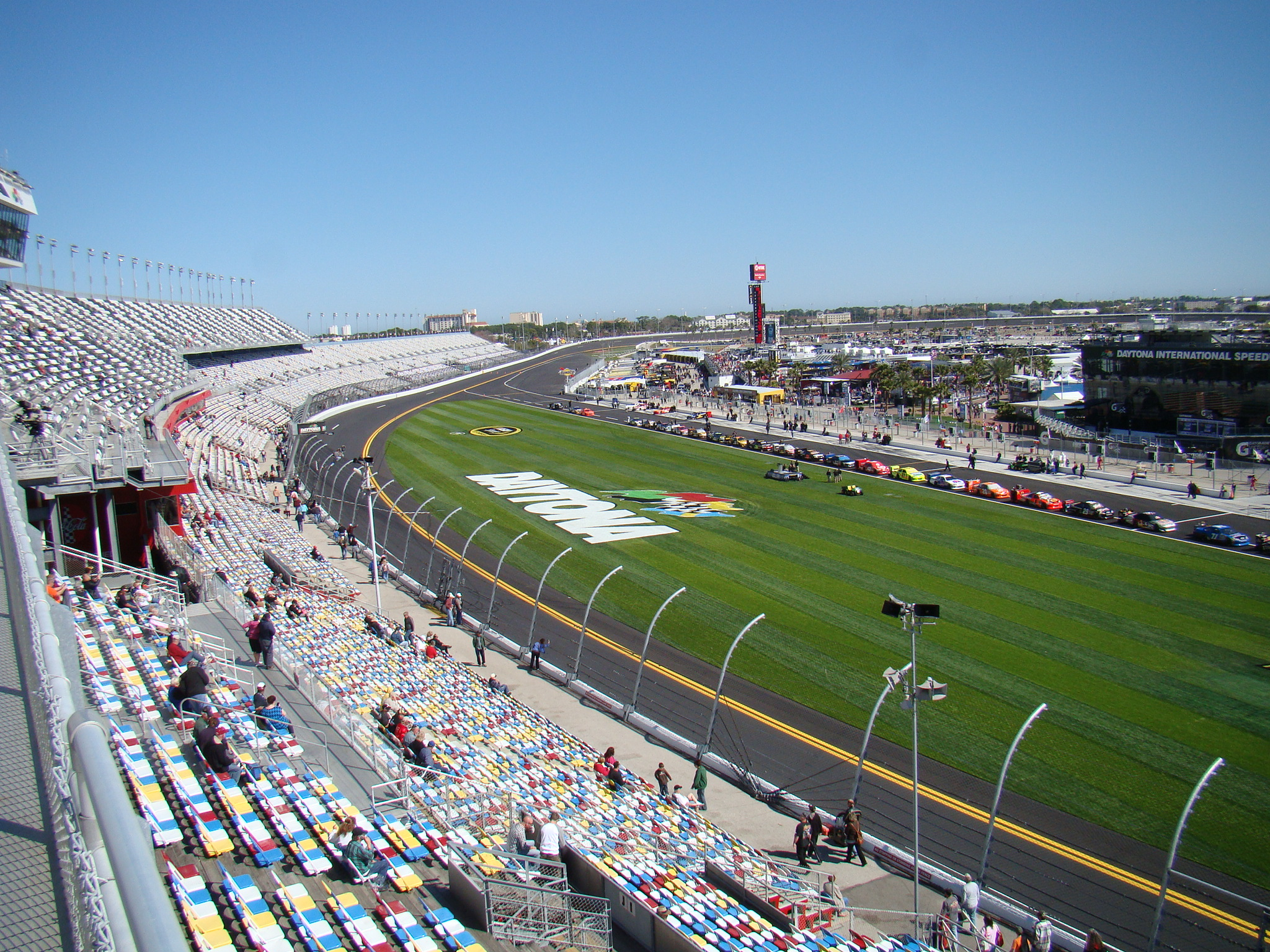
Daytona International Speedway is home to various auto racing events

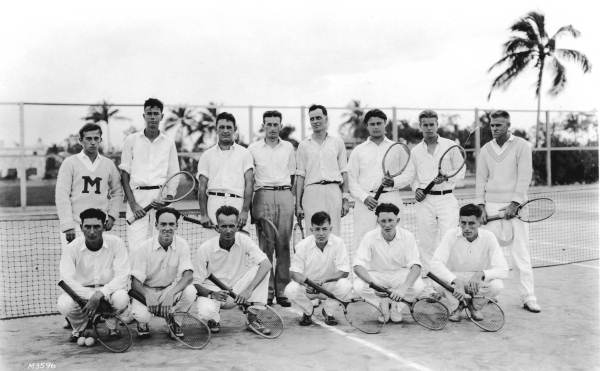
A group of tennis players in Coral Gables (1925)

The U.S. state of Florida has three National Football League teams, two Major League Baseball teams, two National Basketball Association teams, two National Hockey League teams, two Major League Soccer teams and thirteen NCAA Division I college teams.

Florida gained its first permanent major-league professional sports team in 1966 when the American Football League added the Miami Dolphins. The state of Florida has given professional sports franchises some subsidies in the form of tax breaks since 1991.

The sports industry of Florida has a strong economic impact, The Florida Sports Foundation (2022) states that in the fiscal years of 2019 to 2020 and 2020 to 2021 professional sports had accounted for $10.2 billion and college athletics contributed $5.5 billion in Florida’s economy. The sports industry provided about $146.5 billion overall. Florida's sports industry represents about 14% of all the tourism towards Florida and there has been a generated $24.9 billion in total economic impact from the 36 sports commissions. This also applies towards the job market, as new jobs become available with almost a million-part time and full-time jobs generating about $13.9 billion in state and local taxes. These statistics visualize the importance of sports in Florida’s economy, and the associated impact must be valued to understand the influence on Florida’s markets and other related factors involved.

== By sport ==
=== American football ===
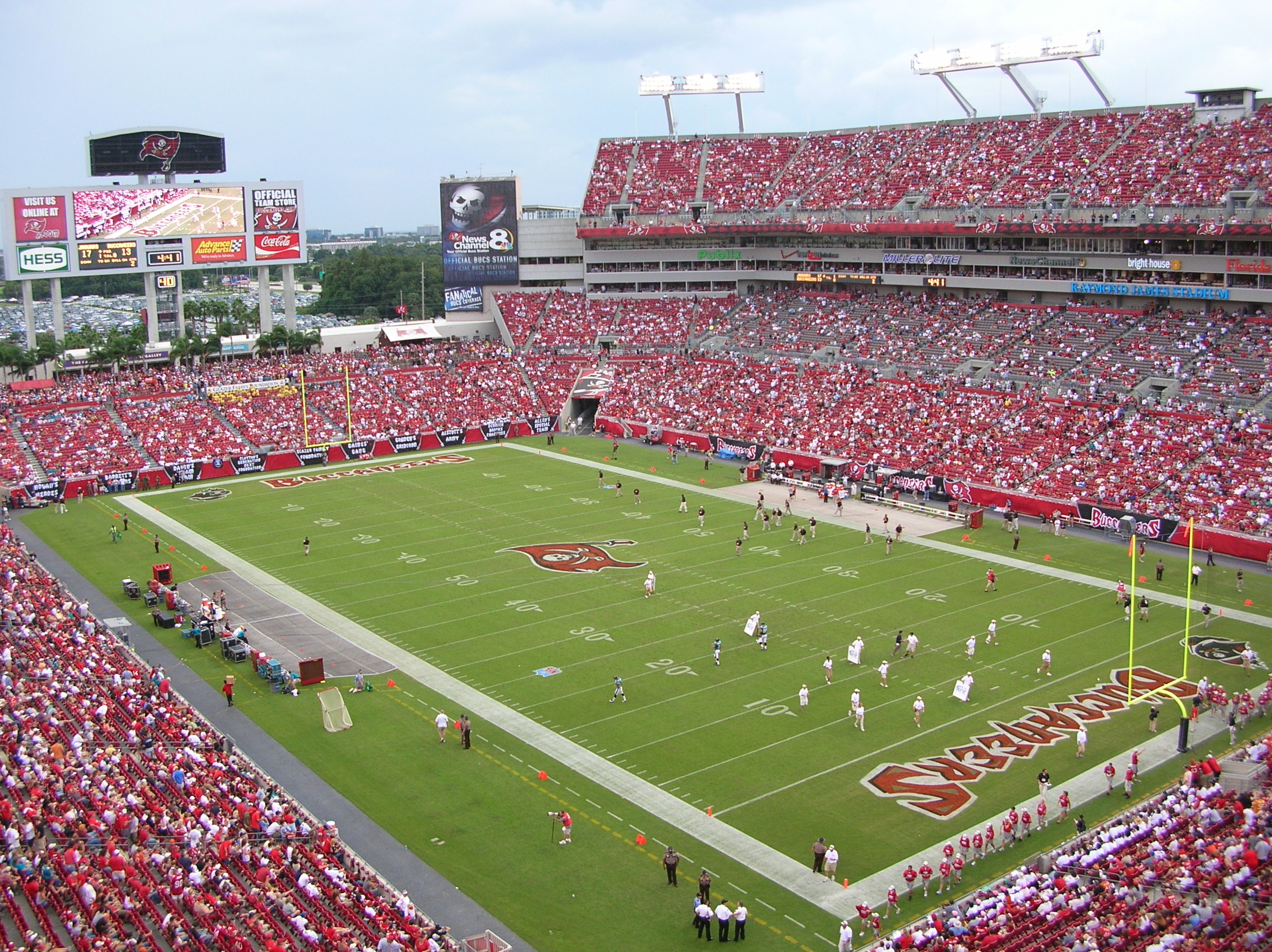
Raymond James Stadium

Miami's first entry into the American Football League was the Miami Dolphins, which competed in the fourth AFL league from 1966 to 1969. In 1970 the Dolphins joined the National Football League when the AFL–NFL merger, agreed to in 1966, was finalized. The team made its first Super Bowl appearance in Super Bowl VI, but lost to the Dallas Cowboys. The following year, the Dolphins completed the NFL's only perfect season culminating in a Super Bowl win. The 1972 Dolphins were the third NFL team to accomplish a perfect regular season, and won Super Bowl VIII, Miami also appeared in Super Bowl XVII and Super Bowl XIX, losing both games. The Dolphins are the oldest major league professional sports team in Florida.

The Tampa Bay Buccaneers began in 1976 as an expansion team of the NFL. They struggled at first, losing their first 26 games in a row to set a league record for futility. After a brief taste of success in the late 1970s, the Bucs again returned to their losing ways, and at one point lost 10+ games for 12 seasons in a row. The hiring of Tony Dungy in 1996 started an improving trend that eventually led to the team's victory in Super Bowl XXXVII in 2003 under coach Jon Gruden. In Super Bowl LV, the Bucs became the first NFL team to host and play in the Super Bowl, where they defeated the Kansas City Chiefs 31-9.

Tom Brady came out of his 40-day retirement from football and joined the Tampa Bay Buccaneers in 2020. Rob Gronkowski, who played alongside Brady for much of his career, also came out of retirement to join him. His first season with the team as quarterback, he brought home the Super Bowl LV win. It was regarded as one of the best quarterback seasons for the Buccaneers.

The Jacksonville Jaguars joined the NFL as an expansion team in the 1995 season; they play their home games at EverBank Stadium.

The Tampa Bay Vipers began play in the XFL in February 2020; they play their home games at Raymond James Stadium.

The World Football League featured the Florida Blazers, Jacksonville Sharks and Jacksonville Express, whereas the United States Football League included the Tampa Bay Bandits, Jacksonville Bulls and Orlando Renegades. The Orlando Rage played in the original XFL in 2001, and the Orlando Apollos played in the Alliance of American Football in 2019.

The Miami metro area has hosted the Super Bowl a total of eleven times (six Super Bowls at Hard Rock Stadium, including Super Bowl LIV and five at the Miami Orange Bowl), tying New Orleans for the most games. Tampa has hosted five Super Bowls: Super Bowl XVIII (1984), Super Bowl XXV (1991), Super Bowl XXXV (2001), Super Bowl XLIII (2009), and Super Bowl LV (2020). The first two events were held at Tampa Stadium, and the other three at Raymond James Stadium. In 2005, Jacksonville hosted Super Bowl XXXIX.

The Orange Bowl is a major college football bowl, held at the Miami metropolitan area since 1935, and is currently a member of the College Football Playoff's New Year's Six.

Other college bowl games in Florida include the Boca Raton Bowl in Boca Raton, the Pop-Tarts Bowl, Citrus Bowl, and Cure Bowl in Orlando, the Gasparilla Bowl and Outback Bowl in Tampa, and the Gator Bowl in Jacksonville.

Jacksonville traditionally hosts the Florida–Georgia game, an annual college football game between the University of Florida and the University of Georgia since 1933.

=== Baseball ===
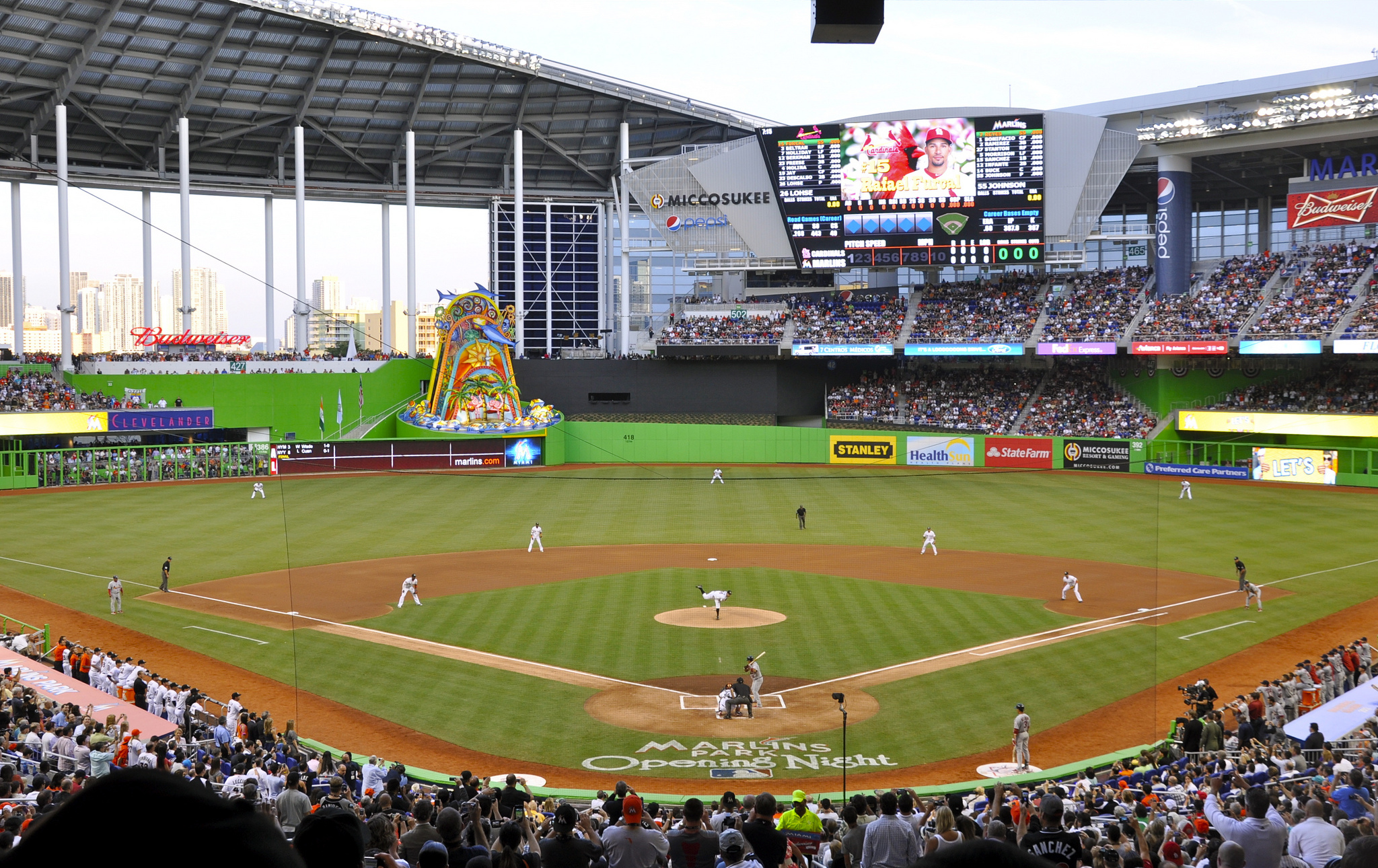
LoanDepot Park, home of the Miami Marlins

Florida has a rich baseball history and has long been home to minor league teams and spring training.

In 1993, the Miami Marlins became the first Major League Baseball team to call Florida home. They won the World Series in 1997 and 2003.

The Tampa Bay Rays began playing in 1998 at Tropicana Field in St. Petersburg. After a decade of futility, the Rays won the 2008 American League Pennant and made it to the World Series but lost to the Philadelphia Phillies. The team won the 2020 American League Pennant and made it back to the World Series but lost to the Los Angeles Dodgers.

Recently, the Tropicana Stadium, where the Tampa Bay Rays play, was destroyed by Hurricane Milton. The city has been working hard to make sure it is back to its original form and is set to be done in December.

15 of the 30 Major League Baseball teams conduct spring training in the state, with teams informally organized into the Grapefruit League. Throughout MLB history, other teams have held spring training in Florida but now hold spring training in Arizona's Cactus League.

Every Grapefruit League team also operates a minor league team in the rookie-level Florida Complex League and holds their spring training at that facility. Many of these teams also have an affiliate in the low-A Florida State League (as do the Cincinnati Reds, who are the only non-Grapefruit League team with a minor league affiliate in Florida). Two teams have Double A affiliates based in Florida.

Within Florida’s economy spring training is something that has persisted even during the COVID-19 pandemic. Despite the difficulties associated with the period, spring training activities had still generated about $680 million for the economic impact for the state of Florida during 2020 and 2021. This displays how the local economy is heavily impacted by sports as even before the pandemic occurred, such as in 2019, resulted in similar levels of revenue during the spring sessions, emphasizing its importance.

Sports tourism is a significant part of Florida’s economic contributions, specifically during baseball’s spring training season, the Florida Grapefruit League (2024) states, a total of 1,428,096 fans attended 226 Florida Spring Training Games in the 2024 season, for an average of 6,319 fans per game. Sports are heavily linked to Florida’s cultural identity and it's correlation with economic development are visualized through the fan turnout that contributes towards local events and attractions associated with commerce.

Minor league baseball teams in Florida include:

==== Florida Complex League ====
Team	Location	MLB Affiliation
FCL Astros	West Palm Beach	Houston Astros
FCL Blue Jays	Dunedin	Toronto Blue Jays
FCL Braves	North Port	Atlanta Braves
FCL Cardinals	Jupiter	St. Louis Cardinals
FCL Marlins	Jupiter	Miami Marlins
FCL Mets	Port St. Lucie	New York Mets
FCL Nationals	West Palm Beach	Washington Nationals
FCL Orioles Black	Sarasota	Baltimore Orioles
FCL Orioles Orange	Sarasota	Baltimore Orioles
FCL Phillies	Clearwater	Philadelphia Phillies
FCL Pirates Black	Bradenton	Pittsburgh Pirates
FCL Pirates Gold	Bradenton	Pittsburgh Pirates
FCL Rays	Port Charlotte	Tampa Bay Rays
FCL Red Sox	Fort Myers	Boston Red Sox
FCL Tigers East	Lakeland	Detroit Tigers
FCL Tigers West	Lakeland	Detroit Tigers
FCL Twins	Fort Myers	Minnesota Twins
FCL Yankees	Tampa	New York Yankees

==== Florida State League (Single-A) ====
Team	MLB affiliation
Bradenton Marauders	Pittsburgh Pirates
Clearwater Threshers	Philadelphia Phillies
Daytona Tortugas	Cincinnati Reds
Dunedin Blue Jays	Toronto Blue Jays
Fort Myers Mighty Mussels	Minnesota Twins
Jupiter Hammerheads	Miami Marlins
Lakeland Flying Tigers	Detroit Tigers
Palm Beach Cardinals	St. Louis Cardinals
St. Lucie Mets	New York Mets
Tampa Tarpons	New York Yankees

==== Double-A ====
Team	MLB Affiliation
Pensacola Blue Wahoos	Miami Marlins

==== Triple-A ====
Team	MLB Affiliation
Jacksonville Jumbo Shrimp	Miami Marlins

=== Basketball ===
Before Florida had its first NBA franchise, the Miami Floridians, later in their history known as The Floridians, played in the American Basketball Association (ABA) from 1968 through 1972.

The Miami Heat of the National Basketball Association was formed in 1988 as an expansion team, winning their first championship in 2006. The team was at the center of controversy in 2010, when reigning MVP Lebron James announced that he was leaving his hometown Cleveland Cavaliers to team up with Dwyane Wade and Chris Bosh in Miami, in a TV special titled The Decision. Despite now being the most disliked team in the league, they went on to appear in four consecutive NBA Finals, winning back to back in 2012 and 2013, with James winning back to back MVPs those same years. The team has since been to two more NBA Finals in recent years, in 2020 and 2023.

The Orlando Magic began playing in NBA in 1989 as an expansion franchise. They have won the Eastern Conference championships in 1995 and 2009.

In 2020, the NBA decided to finish the delayed NBA season in a bubble in the ESPN Wide World of Sports in Orlando, Florida. All of the teams relocated to Walt Disney World and played their games there.

Due to the travel restrictions derived from the COVID-19 pandemic, the Toronto Raptors temporarily relocated to Tampa, playing their home games at Amalie Arena.

It was also the site for the entire WNBA season. All women's teams played their home games out of the IMG Academy in Bradenton, Florida. Florida also had two WNBA teams: the Orlando Miracle (1999-2002) and Miami Sol (2000-2002).

=== Ice hockey ===
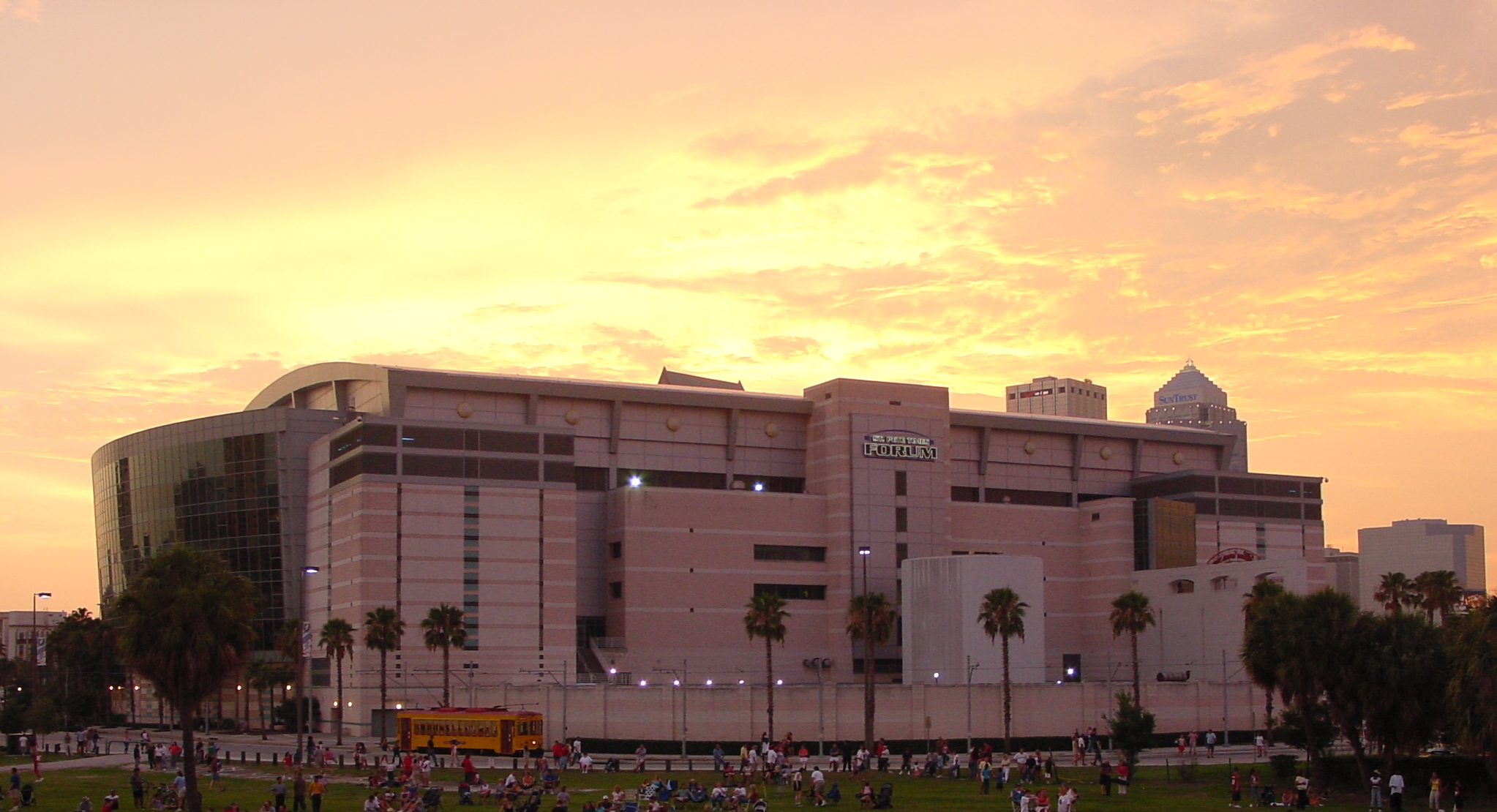
Benchmark International Arena

Established in 1938, the Tropical Hockey League was the first experiment with professional hockey in the American South. It lasted for one season as a professional league, consisting of four teams all based in Miami, then was resurrected as an amateur league before folding in 1941.

The Miami Screaming Eagles co-founded the World Hockey Association in 1971, but never played due to a lack of a suitable arena.

Florida is home to two National Hockey League teams. The Tampa Bay Lightning was established in 1992, and currently play their home games in the Benchmark International Arena, located in downtown Tampa. The Lightning have won the Stanley Cup three times, in 2004, 2020, and 2021. The Lightning also made the Stanley Cup Final in 2015 and 2022, and made the Eastern Conference Final in 2011, 2017, and 2018.

The Florida Panthers was founded in 1993. The club originally played at the Miami Arena, before moving to what is now the Amerant Bank Arena in 1998. They have made four appearances in the Stanley Cup Final, losing in 1996 and 2023, and winning back to back Stanley Cups in 2024 and 2025, both times defeating the Edmonton Oilers.

Florida has three ECHL minor hockey league teams – the Florida Everblades, Jacksonville Icemen, and the Orlando Solar Bears.

=== Soccer ===
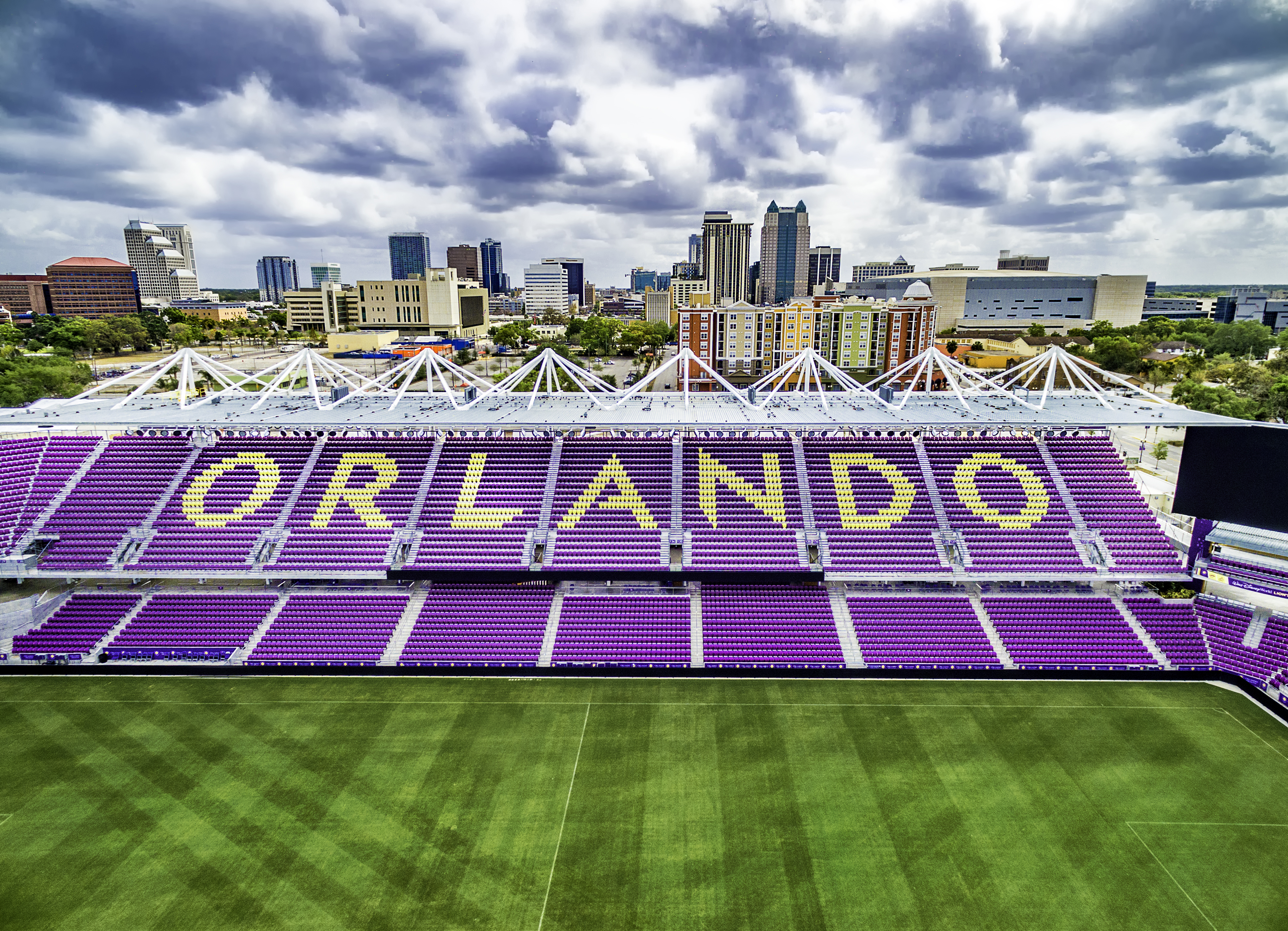
Inter.co Stadium, home to MLS' Orlando City SC

Florida is home to two professional soccer franchises who compete in Major League Soccer (MLS): Orlando City SC (since 2015) and Inter Miami CF (since 2020). Former MLS franchises in Florida include the Tampa Bay Mutiny (1996 to 2001) and the Miami Fusion (1998 to 2001).

Prior to MLS, Florida was previously represented in the original FIFA-backed, major professional North American Soccer League (NASL) by the Tampa Bay Rowdies and Fort Lauderdale Strikers. The Rowdies drew good crowds at Tampa Stadium, and won the Soccer Bowl in 1975. The Strikers franchise was originally based in Miami, and nicknamed the Toros (1972 to 1976) before moving to nearby Fort Lauderdale, Florida prior to the 1977 season. The franchise played their home matches at the Orange Bowl and Lockhart Stadium, and made two Soccer Bowl appearances: losing in 1974 and 1980. Notable NASL footballers who played in Florida include Rodney Marsh (Rowdies) and German legend Gerd Müller (Strikers). The NASL folded in 1984, leaving the United States without a top-level soccer league until Major League Soccer (MLS) began play in 1996.

The Tampa Bay Rowdies Stadium, AI Lang Stadium, is being demolished and being turned into an outdoor amphitheater. They are planning on a four-story, 1,100-car parking garage, a 50,000-square-foot conference center with ground level retail with an open vista of the water.

After over a decade without an MLS team, Orlando City SC joined the league in 2015 after five seasons as a second-level team. The team played its first two MLS seasons at the venue now known as Camping World Stadium before opening Orlando City Stadium, now known as Inter.co Stadium, in 2017. Orlando City's reserve side, Orlando City B, began play in the league now known as the USL Championship in 2016, suspended play after the 2017 season, and resumed play in 2019 as a founding member of the third-level USL League One. Orlando City would withdraw City B from League One after the 2020 season; City B did not play in the 2021 season, but resumed play in 2022 as a founding member of another third-level league, MLS Next Pro. In 2016, the Orlando Pride, operated by Orlando City, began play in the National Women's Soccer League. They have played at the same venue as their parent club throughout their history. In 2025, Inter&Co Stadium had hosted a new FC series, to celebrate its 10-year anniversary, which included matches against major Brazilian soccer clubs: Atlético Mineiro, São Paulo and Cruzeiro.

Miami's MLS team, Inter Miami CF, is partly owned by David Beckham and began league play in 2020. Inter Miami placed its own reserve side, Fort Lauderdale CF, in USL League One in 2020; that team would remain in USL1 until moving to MLS Next Pro in 2022 under the new name of Inter Miami CF II. Miami's other professional team, Miami FC, was founded in 2016 and currently plays in the USL Championship. The team initially played in the new, second-division North American Soccer League, then transitioned into the National Premier Soccer League, before a season in the National Independent Soccer Association, before making the jump to the Division II USL Championship where it plays today.

The year 2023 was a particularly notable period for South Florida soccer. Multiple teams had made exceptional postseason runs, including Lionel Messi joining MLS’s Inter Miami CF. This year was highlighted by the presence of the star athlete and his impact on the state as ticket prices for Inter Miami increased by nearly 1000%, significantly boosting the soccer scene for South Florida.

A second Tampa Bay Rowdies club began play in 2010 as F.C. Tampa Bay, and now currently play in the USL Championship (known before 2019 as the United Soccer League), joining the league after leaving the second-division North American Soccer League in 2016. In this time, they've won one championship in the 2012 North American Soccer League season. The Rowdies were also named co-league champions in 2020 after winning the USL Regular Season title and Eastern Conference Championship, but the title game was canceled due to COVID-19. They were Eastern Conference Champions again in 2021, but lost in the title game.

During the 1994 FIFA World Cup, Camping World Stadium in Orlando hosted several matches. At the 2026 FIFA World Cup, Hard Rock Stadium in Miami Gardens hosted multiple matches.

In 2024, Tampa Bay Sun FC and Fort Lauderdale United FC became the newest professional women's soccer teams in Florida. They both play in the USL Super League, and the Sun defeated Fort Lauderdale in the title game to win the league title in their inaugural season.

Soccer has experienced significant growth in Florida in recent years, both at the professional and youth levels. Major League Soccer clubs such as Inter Miami CF and Orlando City SC have contributed to increasing attendance and fan engagement across the state. This growth reflects broader national trends in soccer’s popularity.

=== Motorsports ===
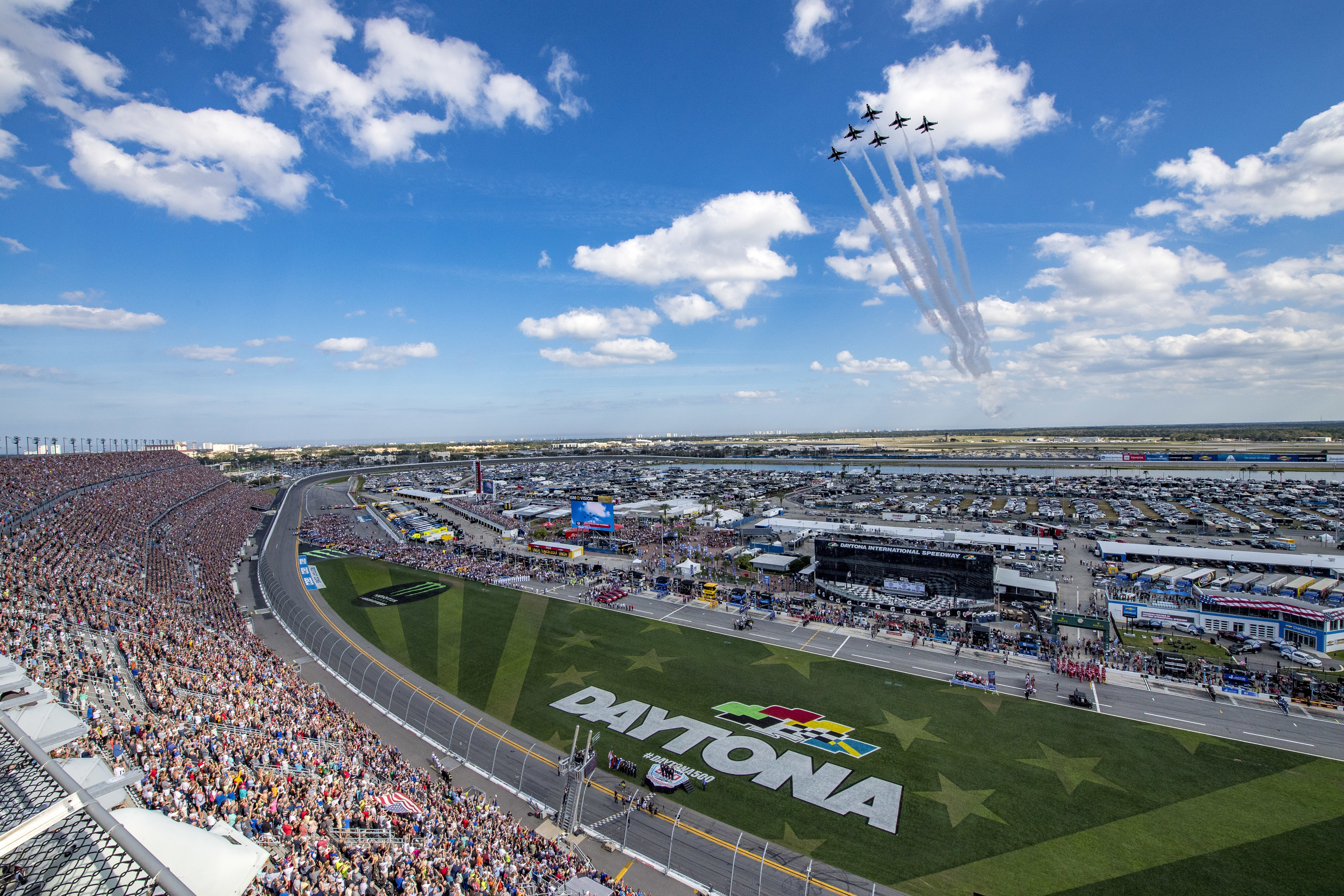
The Daytona 500 is considered the most prestigious race in NASCAR.

NASCAR (headquartered in Daytona Beach) begins all three of its major auto racing series in Florida at Daytona International Speedway in February, featuring the Daytona 500, and Homestead-Miami Speedway in October. Daytona also has the Coke Zero 400 NASCAR race weekend around Independence Day in July. The 24 Hours of Daytona is one of the world's most prestigious endurance auto races.

The 12 Hours of Sebring sports car endurance race is the second largest sporting event in the State of Florida. Each year drawing a total of over 100,000+ fans. It is held in Sebring, Florida at the Sebring International Raceway on the third week of March each year. It is one of the most prestigious car races in the world. Sebring International Raceway's legendary 12-hour endurance race was voted the fourth best auto race of the world's motorsports races in the USA Today 10Best competition. First run in 1952, the world's leading drivers and manufacturers have competed at the 12 Hours of Sebring for over six decades. The race attracts drivers and fans from all over the world.

The Grand Prix of St. Petersburg and Grand Prix of Miami have held IndyCar races as well.

The Gainesville Raceway hosts the annual Gatornationals, one of the major NHRA drag events.

The Miami Grand Prix is a Formula One Grand Prix held at the Miami International Autodrome in Miami Gardens, Florida

=== Other sports ===
The PGA Tour is headquartered in Ponte Vedra Beach, and the LPGA is headquartered in Daytona Beach. The PGA of America (separate from the PGA Tour since 1968) was long based in Palm Beach Gardens before moving its headquarters to Frisco, Texas in 2022.

The Players Championship, WGC-Cadillac Championship, Arnold Palmer Invitational, Honda Classic and Valspar Championship are PGA Tour rounds.

The Miami Open is an ATP Tour Masters 1000 and WTA Premier Mandatory tennis event, whereas the Delray Beach International Tennis Championships is an ATP World Tour 250 event.

Florida is a major horse and greyhound racing market. Notable horse racetracks include Gulfstream Park, Calder, Hialeah Park, Pompano Park and Tampa Bay Downs, whereas notable greyhound racetracks include Big Easy Casino and Derby Lane.

Chess has an organized statewide presence in Florida: the Florida Chess Association has described the state as ranking fourth nationally in US Chess memberships, and the association maintains a tournament clearinghouse and provides state championships for senior, women and girls, K–12 scholastic, collegiate, blitz, quick and overall competition. The association's 2026 championship calendar included the Florida State Scholastic Championship in Orlando, the Florida State Women and Girls Championship in Boca Raton and the Florida State Championship in Melbourne.

Florida's tournament calendar also includes recurring open events such as the Southern Class Championships in Kissimmee, the Space Coast Open Chess Festival in Melbourne and the Harvey Lerman Florida State Championship. Scholastic chess is also substantial in the state: the 2026 Florida State Scholastic Championship had nine sections, awarded individual and school trophies, and reached its maximum capacity of 550 players before registration closed.

The Minto U.S. Open Pickleball Championships, the largest pickleball tournament in the country, has been held since 2016 at the East Naples Community Park in Naples, Florida. The city has been given the title "pickleball capital of the country". The Fort, in Fort Lauderdale, Florida, is the home and training center for the PPA Tour. The facility includes the world's first dedicated pickleball stadium.

Women’s Sports

Women’s sports in Florida have expanded in recent years, though historically they have received less coverage than men’s athletics. Collegiate and professional women’s teams have contributed to increased participation and visibility, particularly in soccer, basketball, and volleyball.

Youth Sports

Youth and school athletics play a significant role in Florida’s sports culture. Organizations such as the Florida High School Athletic Association oversee interscholastic competition involving thousands of students across the state. Participation contributes to athlete development and community engagement.

Mixed Martial Arts

Florida has become a prominent venue for mixed martial arts, regularly hosting major competitions and attracting international audiences. Cities such as Tampa and Miami frequently host high-profile events, including UFC events.

=== Minor league sports ===
Several minor league baseball, football, basketball, soccer and indoor football teams are based in Florida.

Previously, the Arena Football League had four different teams in Florida: the Florida Bobcats (1993–2001), Orlando Predators (1991–2016), Tampa Bay Storm (1991–2017) and Jacksonville Sharks (2010–2016).

Youth sports in Florida plays an economic and social rule towards the local community and the collaboration with grant systems and programs allows for growth locally. The Florida Sports Foundation (2023) states that “during the period of 2018-2022, FSF awarded 689 grants totaling $8.9 million with an economic impact of $3.1 billion”. The grant programs have been helping youth for over 25 years across amateur and professional events throughout the state. These grants are essential for cultivating growth within local communities across the state to assist the youth in generating an economic impact and helping young athletes compete in Florida

=== College sports ===
Florida's universities have a number of notable National Collegiate Athletic Association Division I programs, especially the Florida State Seminoles and Miami Hurricanes of the Atlantic Coast Conference, the Florida Gators of the Southeastern Conference, and the UCF Knights of the Big 12 Conference. Other Division I teams include the Bethune–Cookman Wildcats, Florida A&M Rattlers, Florida Atlantic Owls, Florida Gulf Coast Eagles, FIU Panthers, Jacksonville Dolphins, North Florida Ospreys, South Florida Bulls, and Stetson Hatters.

== By metro area ==
=== Miami ===
Miami's five major professional sports franchises are the Miami Dolphins of the National Football League (NFL), the Miami Heat of the National Basketball Association (NBA), the Miami Marlins of Major League Baseball (MLB), and the Florida Panthers of the National Hockey League (NHL), as well as Inter Miami CF, the Major League Soccer (MLS) expansion team headed by David Beckham. Miami's major sports teams have won two Super Bowls, three NBA Finals, two World Series, two Stanley Cups, and one MLS Cup.

The Miami area also has three NCAA Division I teams: the FIU Panthers in unincorporated Miami-Dade County (with a Miami mailing address), Florida Atlantic Owls in Boca Raton, and the Miami Hurricanes in Coral Gables (with football sharing the Dolphins' stadium in Miami Gardens).

The Miami area was previously represented by the Miami Toros / Ft. Lauderdale Strikers franchise in the original North American Soccer League (NASL) from 1972 to 1983; the Miami Fusion in Major League Soccer from 1998 to 2001; the Miami Floridians in the American Basketball Association (ABA) from 1968 to 1972; and the Miami Sol who played at the Women's National Basketball Association (WNBA) from 2000 to 2002.

=== Tampa Bay ===
Tampa Bay is represented by three sports teams in the four major leagues: the Tampa Bay Buccaneers of the National Football League, the Tampa Bay Lightning of the National Hockey League, and the Tampa Bay Rays of Major League Baseball. Tampa's major sports teams have won two Super Bowls and three Stanley Cups. Tampa is also home to USL Championship's Tampa Bay Rowdies and the USL Super League's Tampa Bay Sun.

The Tampa Bay area is also home to four Minor League Baseball teams: the Bradenton Marauders, Clearwater Threshers, Dunedin Blue Jays, and Tampa Tarpons. The South Florida Bulls are Tampa's only Division I college team, though the area has several Division II teams, most notably the Tampa Spartans.

Tampa was previously the home of two professional soccer franchises: the Tampa Bay Rowdies in the original North American Soccer League (NASL), and the Tampa Bay Mutiny of Major League Soccer (MLS).

=== Orlando ===
Orlando is the home city of two major league professional sports teams — the Orlando Magic of the National Basketball Association (NBA), and Orlando City SC of Major League Soccer (MLS). Also, the Orlando Pride has competed in the National Women's Soccer League since 2016.

Paolo Banchero and Franz Wagner have changed the game for the Orlando Magic Basketball team. Only together for three seasons, they have broken records and made history. They are the first pair of players to average 20.0 points per game since Shaquille O’ Neill and Anfernee Hardaway in 1995-1996.

Orlando also has two minor league professional teams — the Orlando Solar Bears ECHL ice hockey team, and the Orlando Anarchy of the Women's Football Alliance. From 1991 to 2016, it was also home to the Orlando Predators of the Arena Football League and during 2019 it was home of the Orlando Apollos of the Alliance of American Football.

In addition, two NCAA Division I teams call the Orlando area home: the Stetson Hatters (who are based in DeLand) and the UCF Knights (based in unincorporated Orange County with an Orlando mailing address).

From 1999 to 2002, the Orlando Miracle competed in the Women's National Basketball Association before relocating to the Mohegan Sun casino in Connecticut as the Connecticut Sun.

None of Orlando's major sports teams have won any championships, but minor teams have collectively won two ArenaBowls (1998, 2000), two titles in ice hockey, three titles in minor league baseball, and two titles in soccer.

=== Jacksonville ===
Jacksonville is home to one major league sports team, the Jacksonville Jaguars of the National Football League (NFL). They also have several minor league teams including the Jacksonville Jumbo Shrimp for baseball, Jacksonville Sharks for indoor football, and Jacksonville Icemen for hockey.

The Jacksonville Jaguars started up in 1995 of the National Football Conference (NFC) and then later, the National Football League (NFL). After some early success, after the year 2000, they have had struggles making the playoffs.

Jacksonville's two NCAA Division I teams are the Jacksonville Dolphins and the North Florida Ospreys.

== Teams ==
=== Major league professional teams ===
Team	League	Venue	Location	Founded	Championships
Florida Panthers	National Hockey League	Amerant Bank Arena	Sunrise	1993	2 (2024, 2025)
Inter Miami CF	Major League Soccer	Nu Stadium	Miami	2018	1 (2025)
Jacksonville Jaguars	National Football League	EverBank Stadium	Jacksonville	1995	0
Miami Dolphins	National Football League	Hard Rock Stadium	Miami Gardens	1965	2 (1972, 1973)
Miami Heat	National Basketball Association	Kaseya Center	Miami	1988	3 (2006, 2012, 2013)
Miami Marlins	Major League Baseball	LoanDepot Park	Miami	1993	2 (1997, 2003)
Orlando City SC	Major League Soccer	Inter.co Stadium	Orlando	2015	0
Orlando Magic	National Basketball Association	Kia Center	Orlando	1989	0
Orlando Pride	National Women's Soccer League	Inter.co Stadium	Orlando	2016	1 (2024)
Tampa Bay Buccaneers	National Football League	Raymond James Stadium	Tampa	1976	2 (2002, 2020)
Tampa Bay Lightning	National Hockey League	Benchmark International Arena	Tampa	1992	3 (2004, 2020, 2021)
Tampa Bay Sun FC	USL Super League	Riverfront Stadium	Tampa	2024	1 (2025)
Tampa Bay Rays	Major League Baseball	Tropicana Field	St. Petersburg	1998	0

=== NCAA Division I college teams ===
School	Team	City	Conference	Team NCAA Titles (Note: Does not include championships won in FBS football as the NCAA does not award titles in that sport. Also does not include varsity team titles won outside of NCAA competition, such as AIAW titles from before the NCAA sponsored women's sports.)
Bethune-Cookman University	Wildcats	Daytona Beach	Southwestern Athletic Conference (FCS)	0
University of Central Florida	Knights	Orlando (Note: Mailing address is Orlando, but the main campus and all athletic venues are in unincorporated Orange County.)	Big 12 Conference (FBS)	0
University of Florida	Gators	Gainesville	Southeastern Conference (FBS)	42
Florida A&M University	Rattlers and Lady Rattlers	Tallahassee	Southwestern Athletic Conference (FCS)	1
Florida Atlantic University	Owls	Boca Raton	American Conference (FBS)	0
Florida Gulf Coast University	Eagles	Fort Myers (Note: Mailing address is Fort Myers, but the main campus and all athletic venues are in unincorporated Lee County.)	Atlantic Sun Conference (Note: The Atlantic Sun Conference (ASUN) has been a non-football conference since 2023, when it and the Western Athletic Conference (WAC) formed a football-only alliance known as the United Athletic Conference (UAC). The football-only UAC was merged into the WAC in July 2026, at which time the latter took the United Athletic Conference name.)	0
Florida International University	Panthers	Miami (Note: Mailing address is Miami, but the main campus and all athletic venues are in unincorporated Miami-Dade County.)	Conference USA (FBS)	2 (Note: Both of these titles were won while FIU was in NCAA Division II.)
Florida State University	Seminoles	Tallahassee	Atlantic Coast Conference (FBS)	10
Jacksonville University	Dolphins	Jacksonville	Atlantic Sun Conference	0
University of Miami	Hurricanes	Coral Gables (Note: The campus and most athletic venues are in Coral Gables, but the football team plays in Miami Gardens.)	Atlantic Coast Conference (FBS)	83
University of North Florida	Ospreys	Jacksonville	Atlantic Sun Conference	1 (Note: Title was won while UNF was in NCAA Division II.)
University of South Florida	Bulls	Tampa	American Conference (FBS)	1 (Note: Title was won while USF was in NCAA Division II.)
Stetson University	Hatters	DeLand	Atlantic Sun Conference; Pioneer Football League (FCS)	0

== Sports venues ==
=== Stadiums and arenas ===
Stadium	City	Capacity	Type	Tenants	Opened
Ben Hill Griffin Stadium	Gainesville	88,548	Football	Florida Gators	1930
Bobby Bowden Field at Doak Campbell Stadium	Tallahassee	79,560	Football	Florida State Seminoles	1950
Camping World Stadium	Orlando	65,194	Football	Florida Classic, Citrus Bowl, Camping World Bowl	1936
EverBank Stadium	Jacksonville	67,246	Football	Jacksonville Jaguars; Florida vs. Georgia Classic; Gator Bowl; Headquarters of All Elite Wrestling (and occasional AEW venue)	1995
Raymond James Stadium	Tampa	65,857	Football	Tampa Bay Buccaneers; South Florida Bulls; Outback Bowl Gasparilla Bowl	1998
Hard Rock Stadium	Miami Gardens	65,326	Football	Miami Dolphins, Miami Hurricanes; Orange Bowl; Miami Open (tennis); Miami Grand Prix (Note: The Miami Grand Prix uses the stadium grounds, but not the stadium itself.)	1987
Acrisure Bounce House	Orlando	45,906	Football	UCF Knights	2007
LoanDepot Park	Miami	37,000	Baseball	Miami Marlins	2012
Tropicana Field	St. Petersburg	36,973	Baseball	Tampa Bay Rays	1990
Flagler Credit Union Stadium	Boca Raton	30,000	Football	Florida Atlantic Owls, Boca Raton Bowl	2011
Nu Stadium	Miami	26,700	Soccer	Inter Miami CF	2026
Bragg Memorial Stadium	Tallahassee	25,500	Football	Florida A&M Rattlers	1957
Inter.co Stadium	Orlando	25,500	Soccer	Orlando City SC, Orlando Pride, Cure Bowl	2017
Inter Miami CF Stadium	Fort Lauderdale	21,550	Soccer	Inter Miami CF II	2019
Amerant Bank Arena	Sunrise	20,737	Arena	Florida Panthers	1998
Benchmark International Arena	Tampa	20,500	Arena	Tampa Bay Lightning	1996
Pitbull Stadium	Miami	20,000	Football	FIU Panthers, Miami FC	1995
Kaseya Center	Miami	19,600	Arena	Miami Heat	1999
Kia Center	Orlando	18,846	Arena	Orlando Magic; Orlando Solar Bears	2010
VyStar Veterans; Memorial Arena	Jacksonville	14,091	Arena	Jacksonville Icemen; Jacksonville Sharks	2003
Donald L. Tucker Center	Tallahassee	12,100	Arena	Florida State Seminoles	1981
Expo Hall	Tampa	11,700	Arena		1976
O'Connell Center	Gainesville	10,500	Arena	Florida Gators	1980
Silver Spurs Arena	Kissimmee	10,500	Arena		2003
Yuengling Center	Tampa	10,411	Arena	South Florida Bulls	1980
Jostens Center	Lake Buena Vista	10,000	Arena		2008
Addition Financial Arena	Orlando	9,465	Arena	UCF Knights	2007
Ocean Center	Daytona Beach	8,362	Arena		1985
Pensacola Bay Center	Pensacola	8,300	Arena	Pensacola Ice Flyers	1985
RP Funding Center	Lakeland	8,178	Arena	Florida Tropics SC; Lakeland Magic; Tampa Bay Tornadoes	1974
Watsco Center	Coral Gables	7,972	Arena	Miami Hurricanes	2003
Al Lang Stadium	St. Petersburg	7,500	Soccer	Tampa Bay Rowdies	1947
Hertz Arena	Estero	7,128	Arena	Florida Everblades	1998

=== Auto racing tracks ===
- Daytona International Speedway
- Miami International Autodrome (Formula One)
- Gainesville Raceway
- Homestead-Miami Speedway
- Sebring International Raceway
- Streets of St. Petersburg
- Palm Beach International Raceway
- Five Flags Speedway

== See also ==
- Sports teams in Florida
- Florida Sports Hall of Fame
