= Seminole Casino Hotel Immokalee =

Tribal resort in Immokalee, Florida

Coordinates: 26.4106°N 81.41646°W

- Interactive map of Seminole Casino Hotel Immokalee
- Location: 506 South First Street Immokalee, FL 34142
- No. of rooms: 99
- Notable restaurants: 3
- Owner: Seminole Tribe of Florida
- Website: casino.hardrock.com/immokalee

The Seminole Casino Immokalee is a Class III tribal casino hotel resort in the town of Immokalee, Florida, United States, 35 miles from Naples. The Seminole Casino is owned and operated by the Seminole Tribe of Florida. Originally opened in February 1994, and recently expanded the property in February 2009; the Seminole Casino offers Vegas Style Slot machines.

The hotel opened in 2015. It has 99 rooms.

== See also ==
- List of casinos in Florida
- Seminole Hard Rock Hotel and Casino Hollywood
- Seminole Hard Rock Hotel and Casino Tampa
