= List of casinos in Florida =

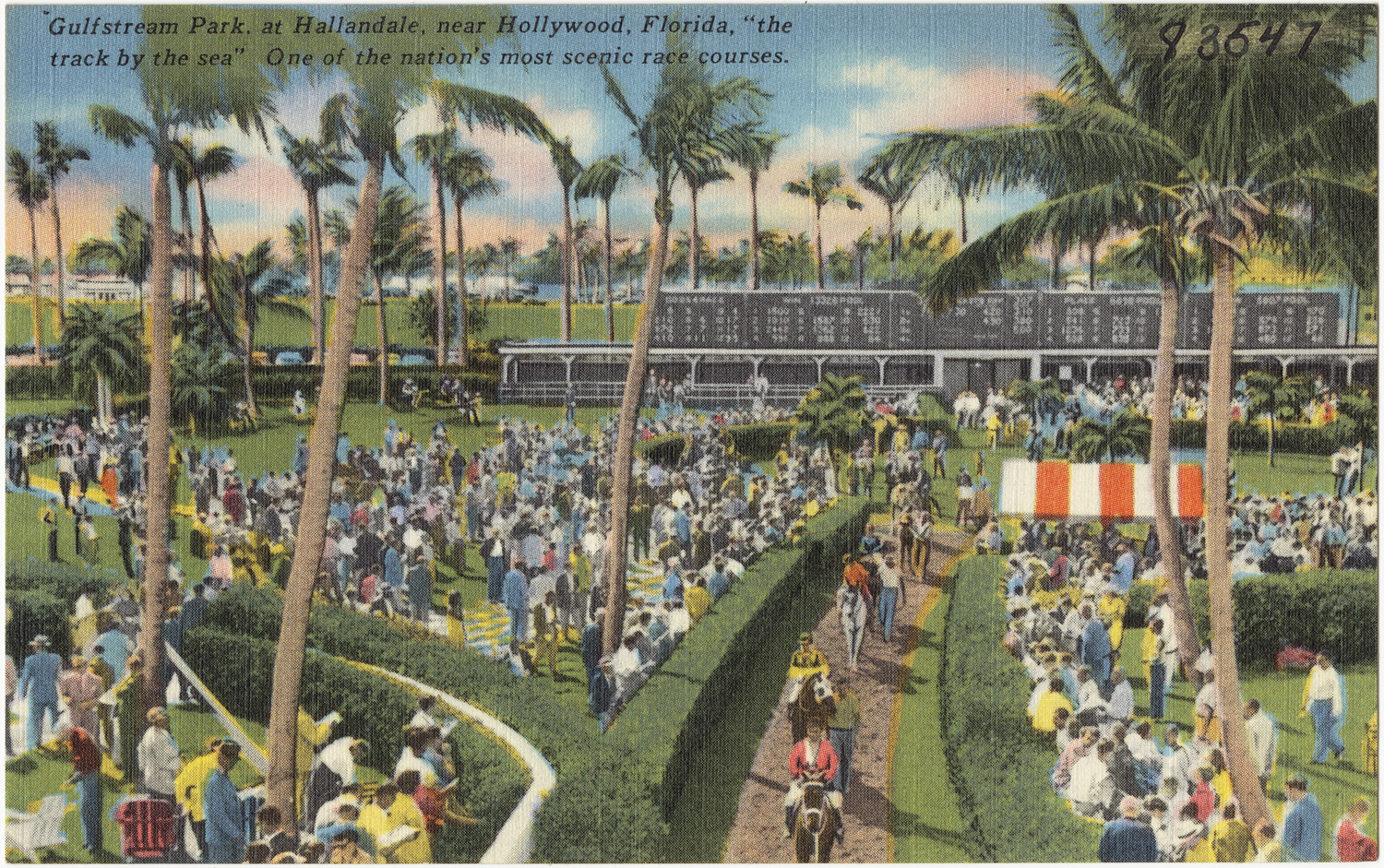
Gulfstream Park, at Hallandale, near Hollywood, Florida

This is a list of casinos in Florida.

== List of casinos ==
List of casinos in the U.S. state of Florida
Casino	City	County	State	District	Type	Comments
Big Easy Casino	Hallandale Beach	Broward	Florida		Racino
Calder Casino & Race Course	Miami Gardens	Miami-Dade	Florida		Racino
Casino Miami Jai-Alai	Miami	Miami-Dade	Florida		Racino
Creek Entertainment Gretna	Gretna	Gadsden	Florida		Racino
Dania Jai-Alai	Dania Beach	Broward	Florida		Racino
Daytona Beach Racing and Card Club	Daytona Beach	Volusia	Florida		Racino
Derby Lane	St. Petersburg	Pinellas	Florida		Racino
Ebro Greyhound Track	Ebro	Washington	Florida		Racino
Flagler Dog Track and Magic City Casino	Miami	Miami-Dade	Florida		Racino
Fort Pierce Jai-Alai & Poker	Fort Pierce	St. Lucie County	Florida		Racino
Gulfstream Park Racing and Casino	Hallandale Beach	Broward	Florida		Racino
Harrah's Pompano Beach	Pompano Beach	Broward	Florida		Racino
Hialeah Park Race Track	Hialeah	Miami-Dade	Florida		Racino
Best Bet Jacksonville	Jacksonville	Duval	Florida		Racino
Jefferson County Kennel Club	Monticello	Jefferson	Florida		Racino	Closed in 2014
Magic City Casino	Miami	Miami-Dade	Florida		Racino
Melbourne Greyhound Park	Melbourne	Brevard	Florida		Racino
Miccosukee Resort and Gaming Center	Miami	Miami-Dade	Florida		Native American	Owned by the Miccosukee Tribe of Indians
Naples/Fort Myers Greyhound Track	Bonita Springs	Lee	Florida		Racino
Ocala Poker & Jai-Alai (later Ocala Gainesville Poker)	Orange Lake	Marion	Florida		Racino	Closed in October 2023
Best Bet Orange Park	Orange Park	Clay	Florida		Racino
Orange City Racing and Card Club	Orange City	Volusia	Florida		Racino
Oxford Downs	Summerfield	Marion	Florida		Racino
Palm Beach Kennel Club	West Palm Beach	Palm Beach	Florida		Racino
Pensacola Greyhound Track	Pensacola	Escambia	Florida		Racino
Sarasota Kennel Club	Sarasota	Sarasota	Florida		Racino
Seminole Casino Big Cypress	Clewiston	Hendry	Florida		Native American	Defunct – formally owned by the Seminole Tribe of Florida
Seminole Casino Brighton	Okeechobee	Okeechobee	Florida		Native American	Owned by the Seminole Tribe of Florida
Seminole Casino Hotel Immokalee	Immokalee	Collier	Florida		Native American	Owned by the Seminole Tribe of Florida
Seminole Casino Coconut Creek	Coconut Creek	Broward	Florida		Native American	Owned by the Seminole Tribe of Florida
Seminole Hard Rock Hotel and Casino Hollywood	Hollywood	Broward	Florida		Native American	Owned by the Seminole Tribe of Florida
Seminole Hard Rock Hotel and Casino Tampa	Tampa	Hillsborough	Florida		Native American	Owned by the Seminole Tribe of Florida
Seminole Classic Casino	Hollywood	Broward	Florida		Native American	Owned by the Seminole Tribe of Florida
Tampa Bay Downs	Tampa	Hillsborough	Florida		Racino
Tampa Greyhound Track	Tampa	Hillsborough	Florida		Racino
Best Bet St. Augustine	St. Augustine	Flagler	Florida		Racino

== Gallery ==
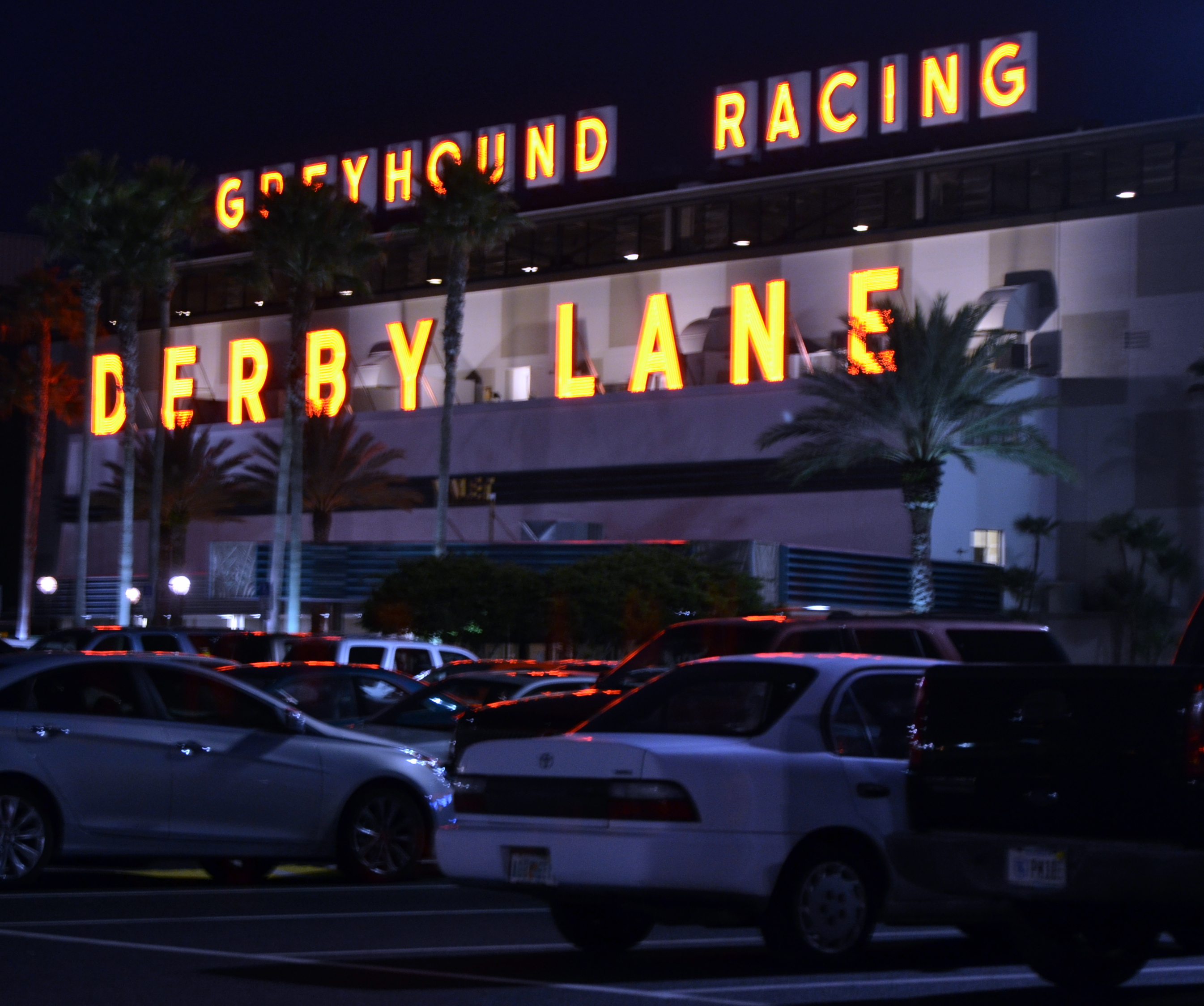

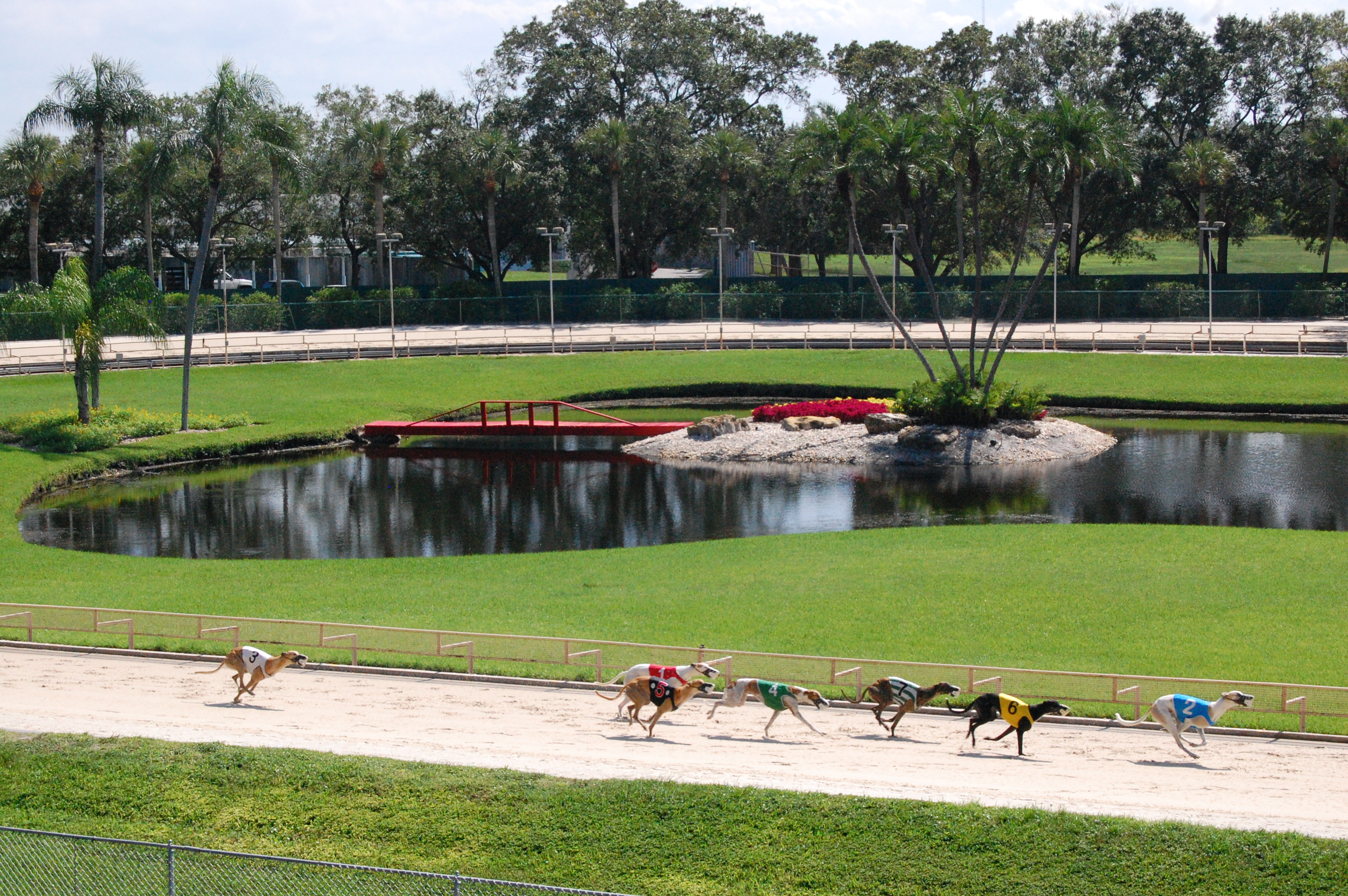

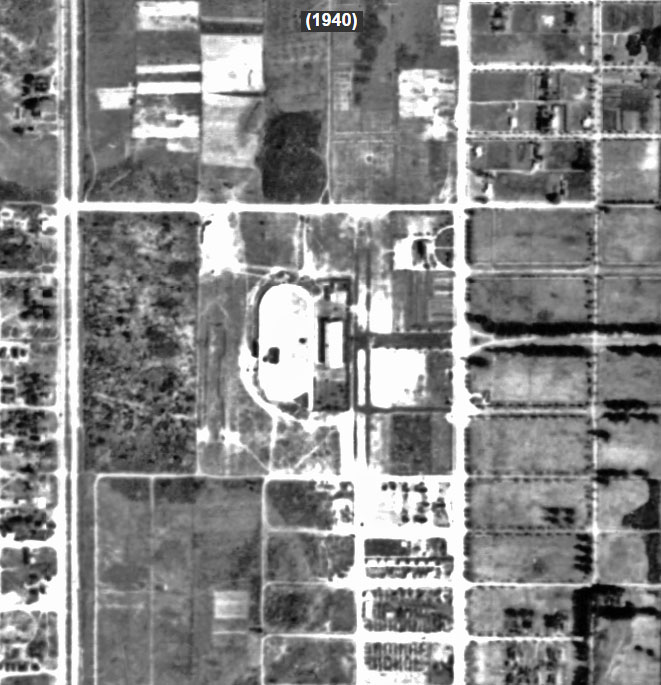

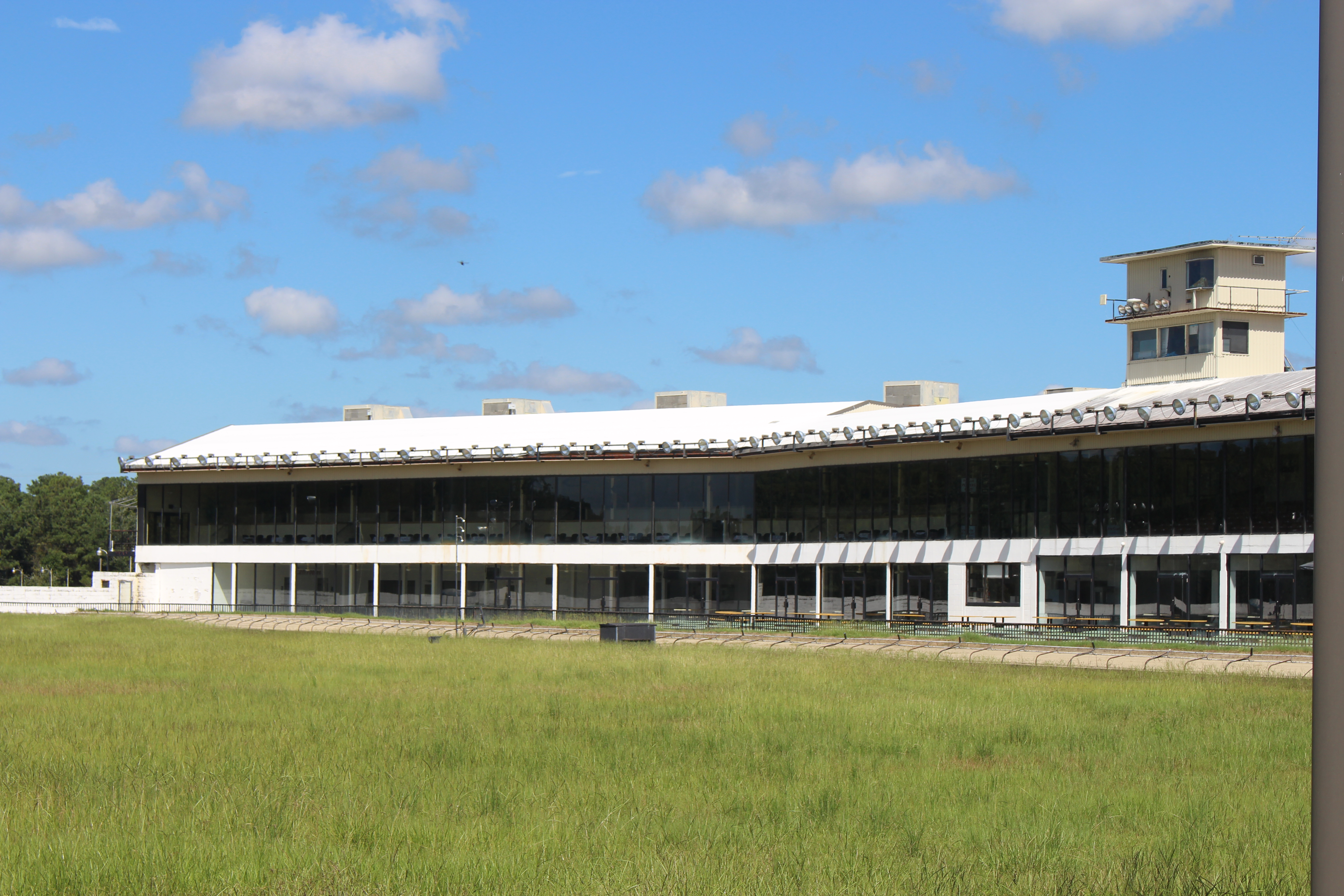
Jefferson County Kennel Club

== See also ==
- List of casinos in the United States
- List of casino hotels
