= Derby Lane Greyhound Track =

Racing track and casino in St. Petersburg, Florida

- Interactive map of Derby Lane Greyhound Track
- Location: St. Petersburg, Florida
- Coordinates: 27.8667°N 82.6267°W
- Date opened: January 3, 1925
- Race type: Greyhound

Derby Lane Greyhound Track is a racino located in St. Petersburg, Florida, United States. Originally named the St. Petersburg Kennel Club, it was the oldest continuously operating greyhound track in the country until the discontinuation of greyhound racing on December 27, 2020. However, it remains open for simulcasting and has a poker room.

T.L. Weaver, a lumber entrepreneur, sold the tract of land Derby Lane is sited on to a group of local businessmen, who constructed the track and held its grand inaugural race on January 3, 1925. Shortly thereafter, however, the investors ran into financial hardship and were no longer able to make payments on the land. Possession of the track reverted to Weaver's lumber company, and Weaver decided to keep it and operate it himself. Derby Lane was owned by the Weaver family until 2025. It was reported on April 22 of that year that the facility was sold to a development firm.

== History ==
In 2006 and 2007, Derby Lane was the site of the richest greyhound race in history, the Derby Lane Million, a stakes race in which the winner took home a $500,000 purse (the other $500,000 was divided amongst the remainder of the field). Grey's Calibrator, the only female in the field, won in 2006 and Flying Stanley won in 2007.

== Description ==
During the period that is raced greyhounds, Derby Lane offered races in two distances – 550 yards (5/16 of a mile) and 660 yards (3/8 of a mile). The track is 21 feet wide, features a straightaway of 243 feet and the length of the stretch is 458 feet. The track's surface contains regulated and maintained white sand. (accessed November 2012, select Derby Lane from Submit list).

A fountain and small manmade lake can be found in the middle of the infield. A small island of 5 palm trees on sand is in the middle of the lake, connected by a narrow bridge the short distance back to the mainly grassy infield.

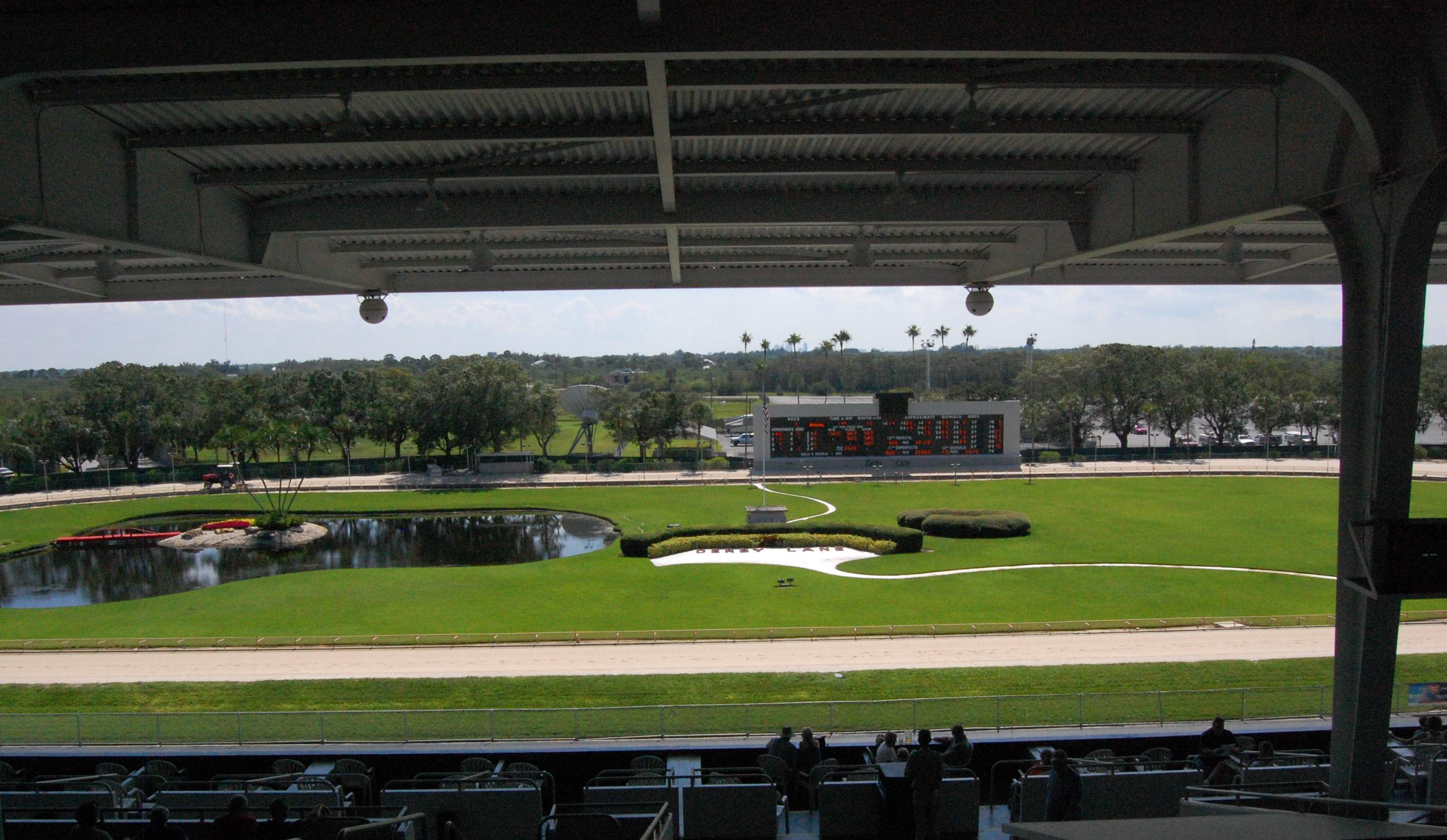
View of infield from grandstand

There is a path which weaves through the middle of the infield, but it is not used very often, most often it is the photoshoot location for winners of major stakes races. Behind the winners circle there is a small warehouse type of building used for toteboard, lure, and gate electronic operations.

The lure was a standard inside rail lure known as an Alldritt lure, named for its inventor, Roy H. Alldritt. It ran on electricity. Originally named the Wonder Lure, it revolutionized oval track greyhound racing in 1937 - it was both reliable and kept the dogs interested in chasing it.

The lure at Derby Lane was called 'Hareson Hare' by the race callers. The announcer positions on the track was held by two people, however only one worked the day's races. Jim Peake was the main track announcer from 1995 until the track's closure for live races and performed most of the announcing duties. Evening performances were held every day except for Sunday, and doubleheader (afternoon or matinee and evening performances) races were held on Wednesday and Saturday. TV monitors displayed tote information, weights and post positions, races, results, replays, and photos. The winner's circle was only used for major and stakes races, and weights and post positions were announced and filmed on track. The paddock was only used for dressing and weighing the dogs.

== The track ==
The track consists of three levels. All 3 offer concessions, the top 2 offering dine-in options, and 1 containing a poker room. The paddock is right of the track and can be viewed by a short walk from the finish line. Serviced and self serviced totes are available on every level. The most notable of tote areas being the one on track level, where the words DERBY LANE are spelled out in neon partnered with a greyhounds stride across the sign. The track has a liquor license.

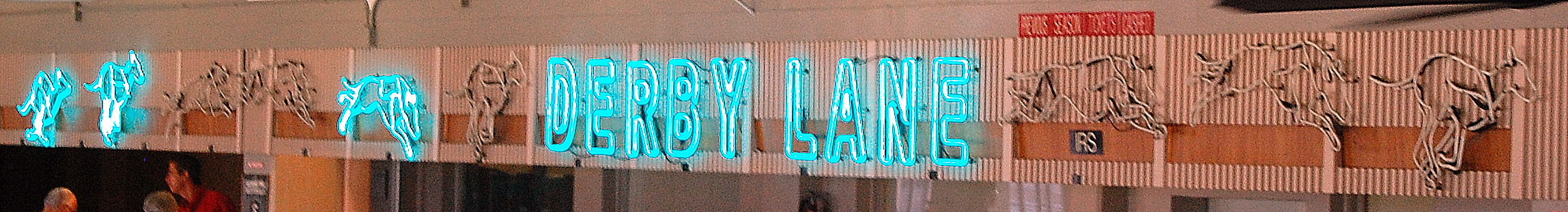
Neon sign above mutuel windows at Derby Lane

The track was the oldest greyhound racing track in the country, and (according to the SP Times and track relations officials) was one of the few still making money in Florida. Due to competition around the area which includes casino boats, casinos, and horse tracks, Derby Lane has lost some qualities gradually such as a gift shop (lost 2009) a bar (lost 2008) and several other cost-cutting measures have been taken around the track. Turnout, though declining, was boosted by the closing of the second nearest dog track: Tampa Bay Greyhound Track. However, Florida Amendment 13 passed by the voters of that state in 2018, meant the end of greyhound racing in the state. After 95 years, Derby Lane held its last card of races as a series of matinee races on December 27, 2020.

== Alternate gaming options ==
The track offers simulcast and pari-mutuel wagering on major dog and horse racing, when the participating tracks/ events live performance schedule is applicable. Derby Lane also is home to the Derby Lane Poker Room, where several standard card games are offered. The track is classified as a racino, but no slots, or Vegas Style games have been approved for the location.

== Gallery ==
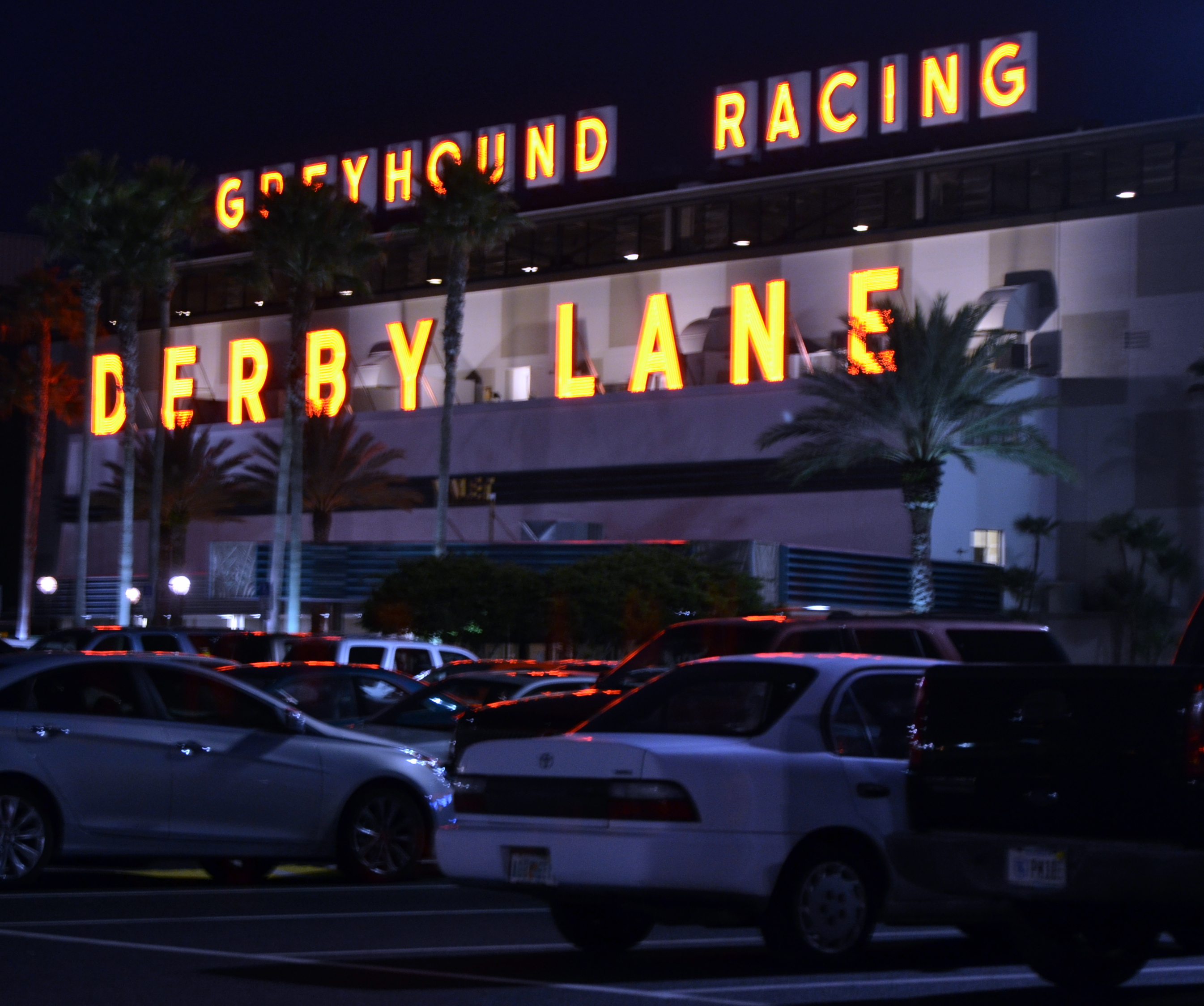
Race track entrance at night

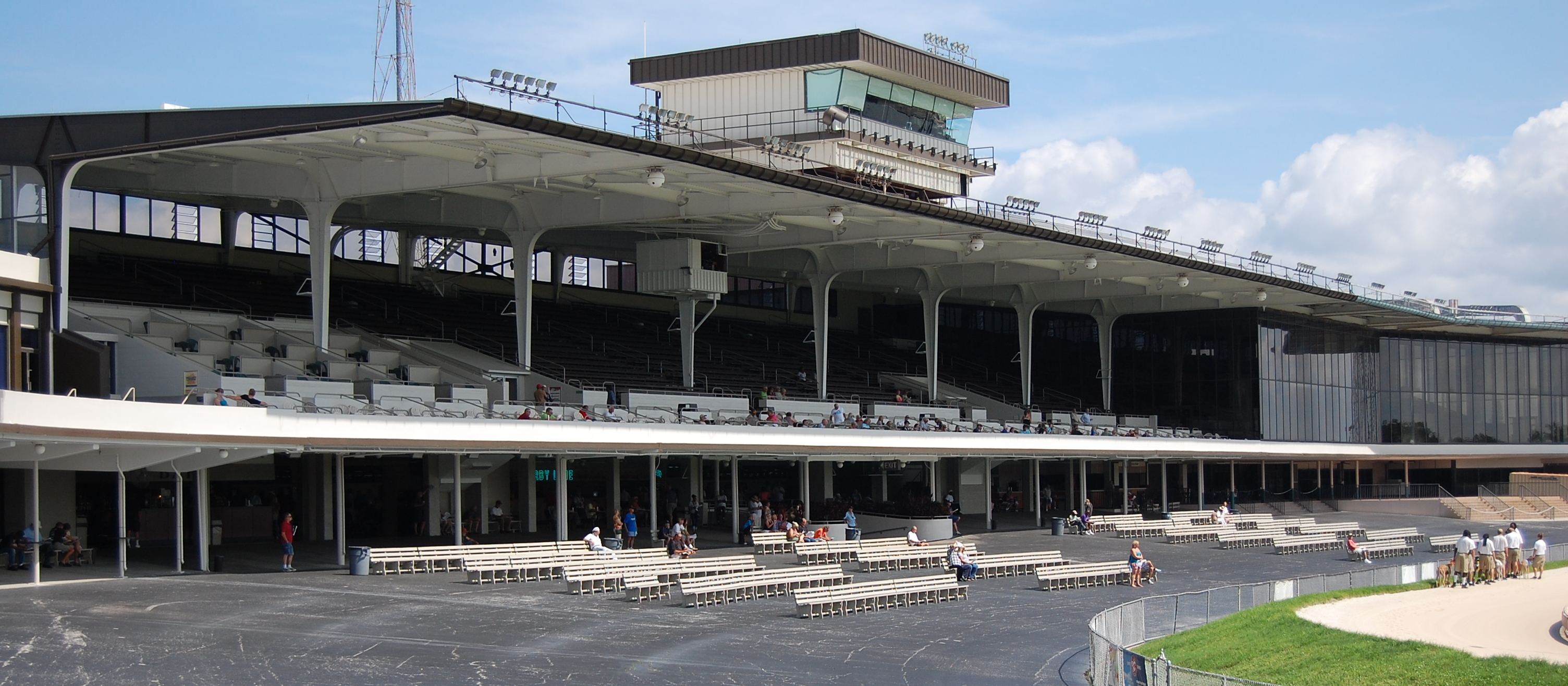
Grandstand

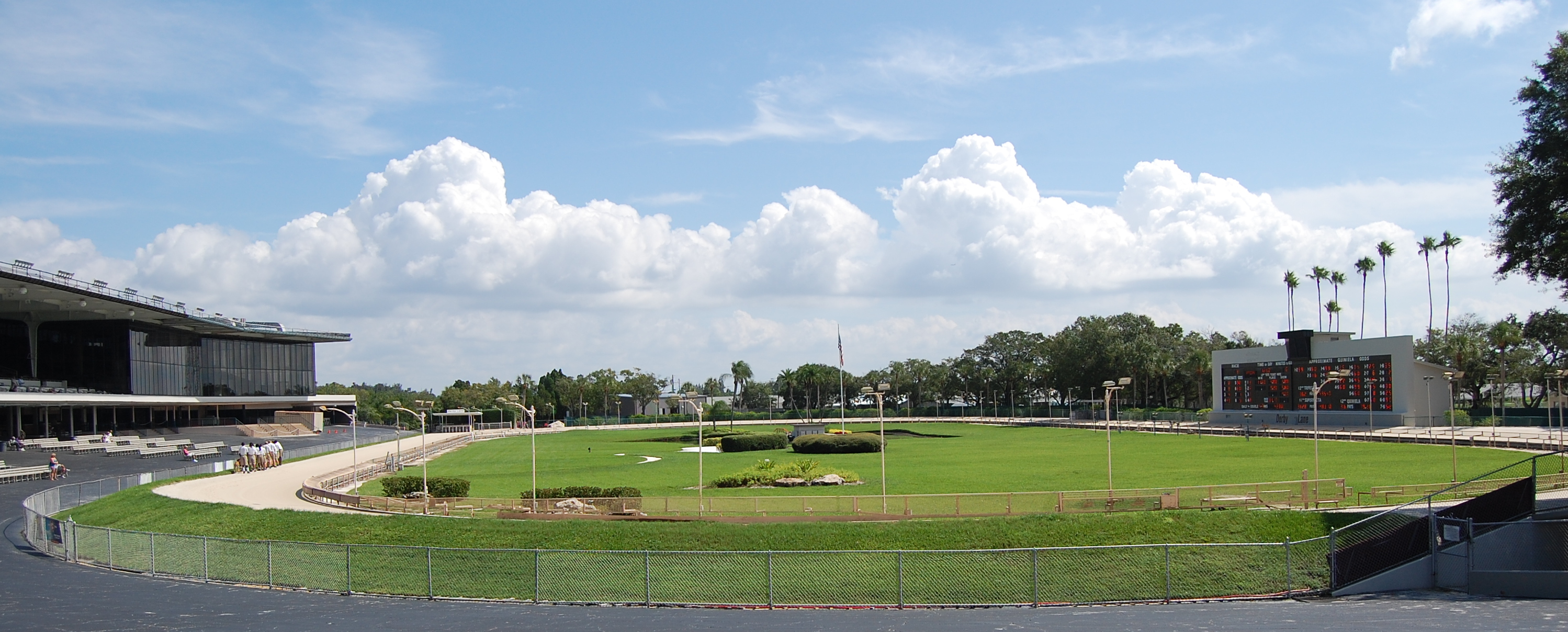
View of the track from the end of the first turn

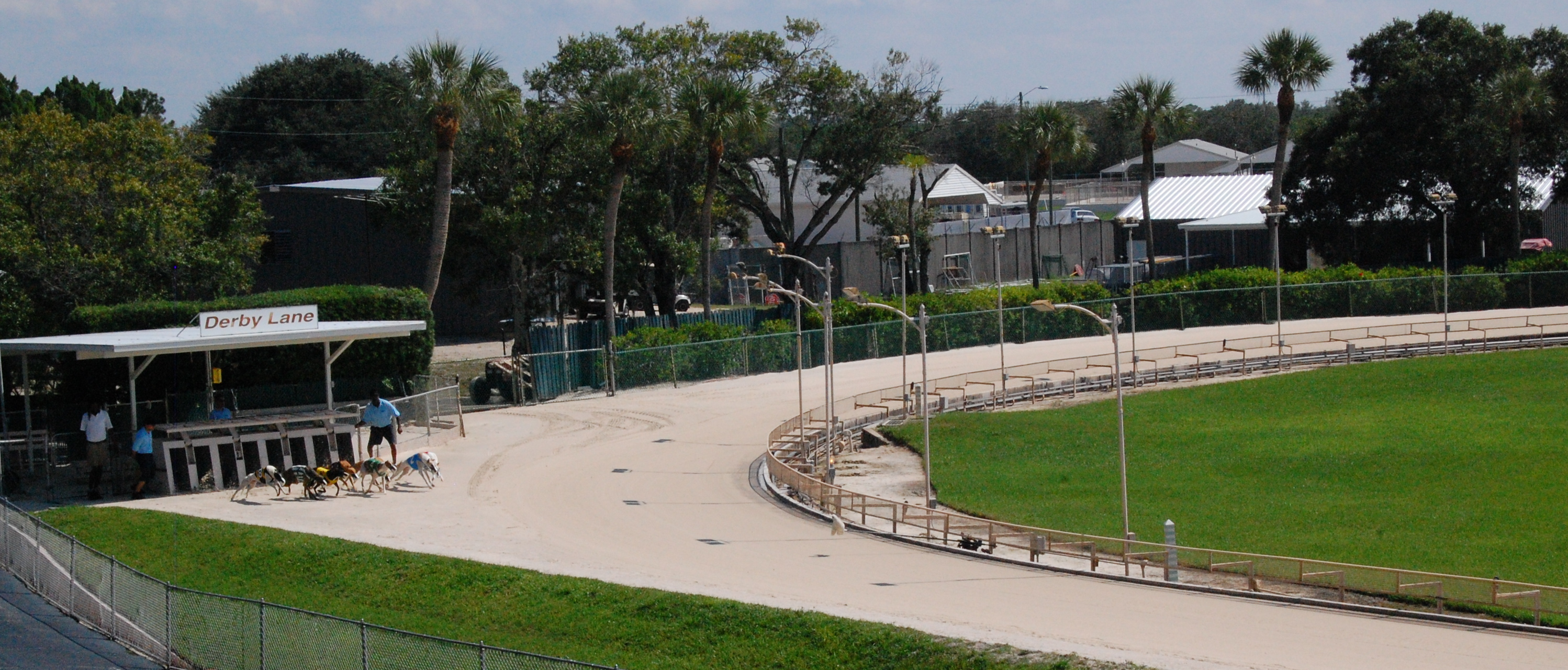
Greyhounds burst from the starting box

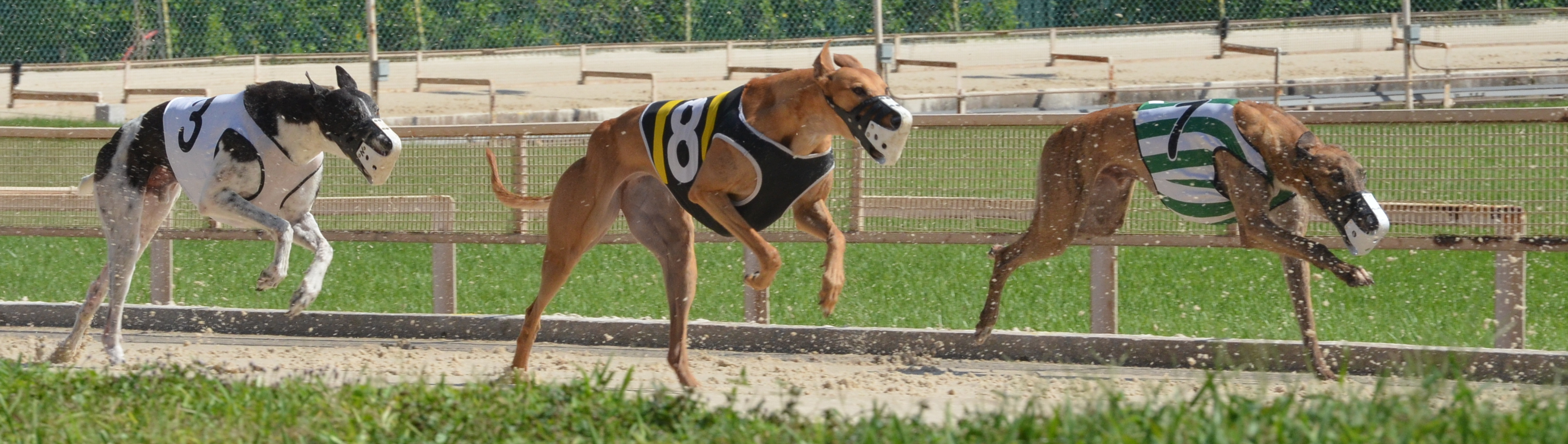
Greyhounds race down the front stretch

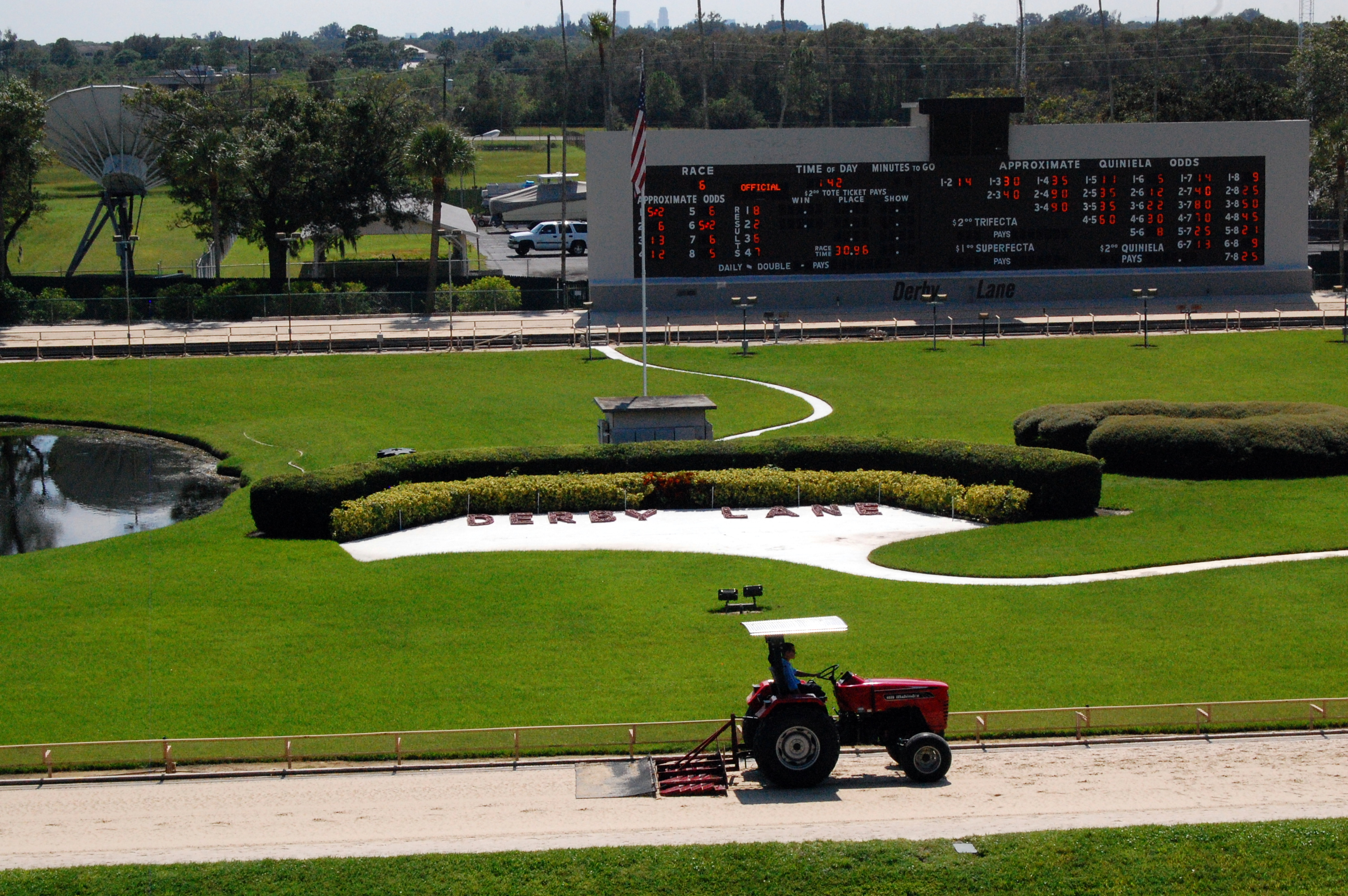
Track being groomed between races

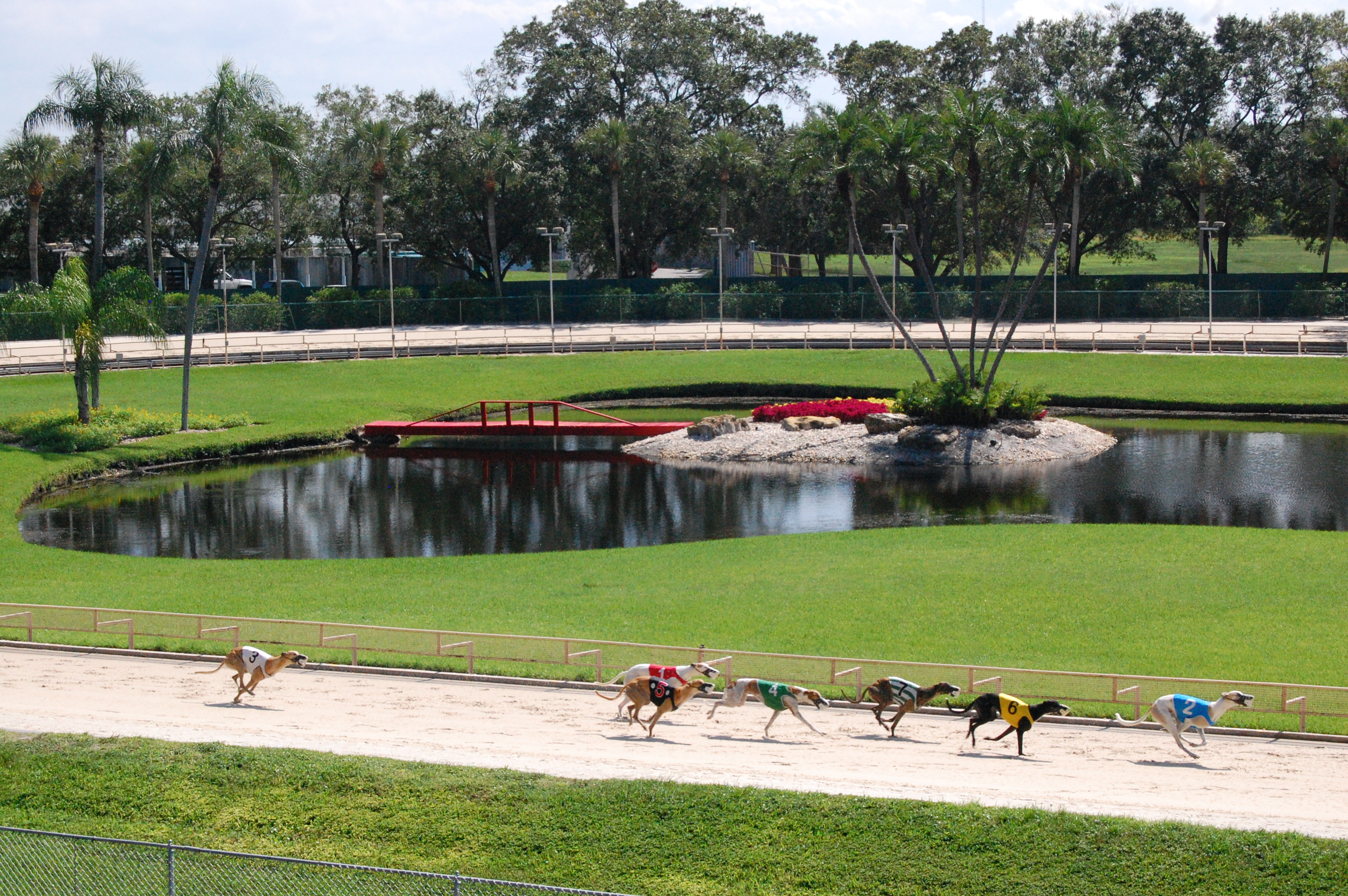
A view of the infield at the start of a race

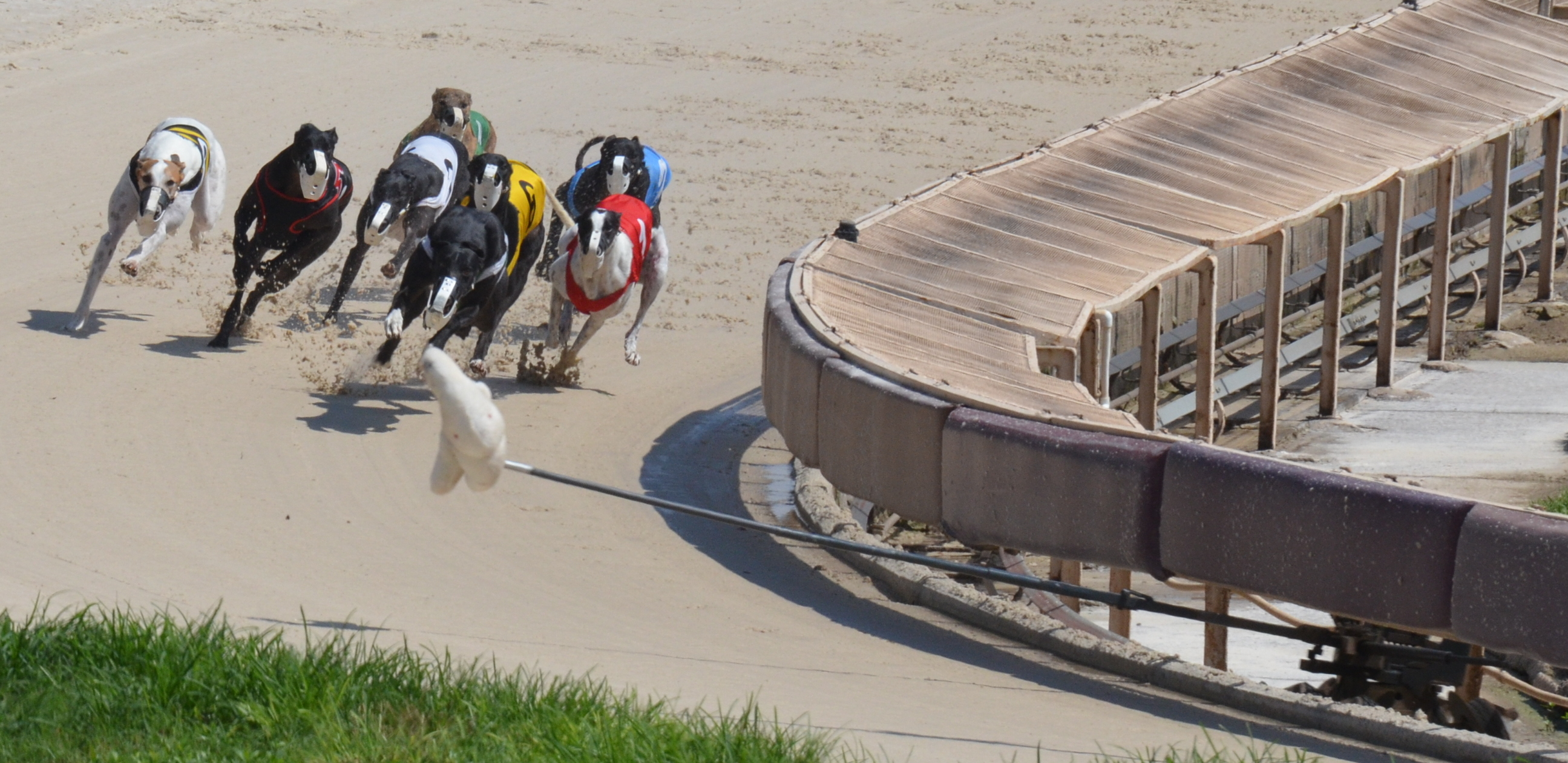
Greyhounds chase the lure toward the first turn

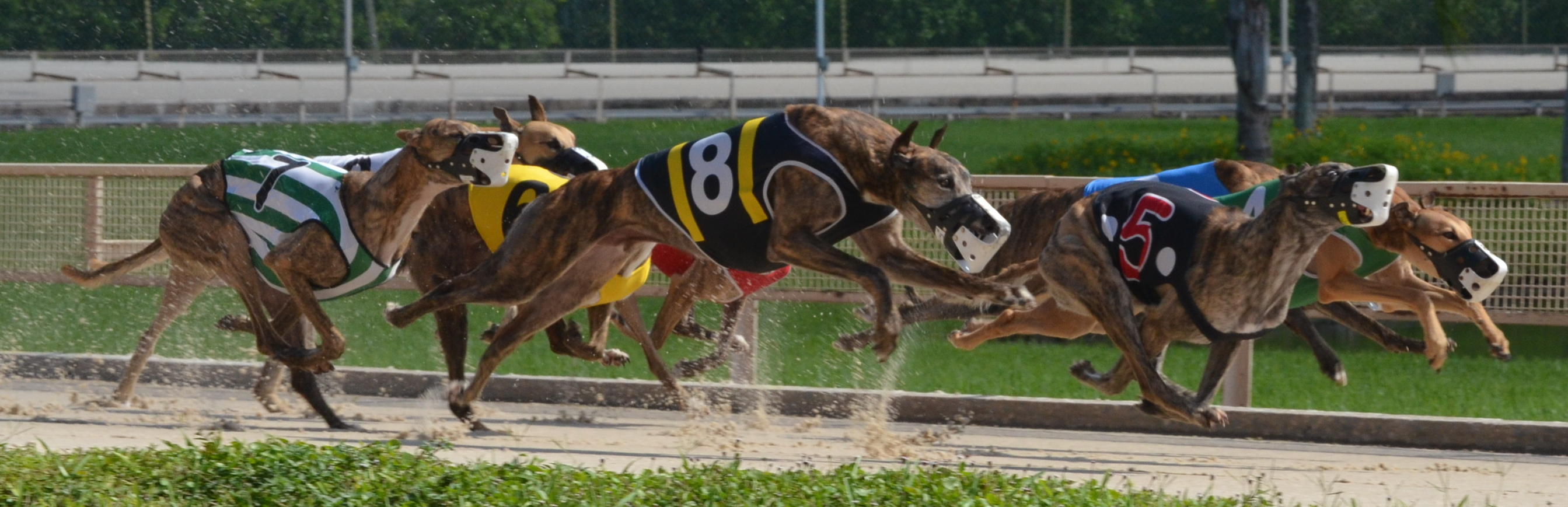
Greyhounds stretch toward the finish line

== See also ==
- List of casinos in Florida
- Derby Lane Greyhound Track
