= Big Easy Casino =

Greyhound racing facility in Hallandale Beach, Florida

Coordinates: 25°59′41.42″N 80°8′43.77″W

- Interactive map of The Big Easy Casino
- Location: Hallandale Beach, Florida, U.S.; 831 N. Federal Highway
- Opened: December 1, 1934
- Theme: New Orleans
- Gaming space: 70,0000+ square feet
- Notable restaurants: The French Quarter; Bonjour Cafe; Le Royale; Trifecta Grille & Bar
- Owner: Jeffrey Soffer
- Previous names: Mardi Gras Casino; Hollywood Greyhound Track; Hollywood Kennel Club
- Renovated in: 2015; 2006; 1974; 1940
- Website: thebigeasycasino.com

The Big Easy Casino, formerly known as Mardi Gras Casino and Hollywood Greyhound Track, is a casino and formerly a greyhound racing facility located in Hallandale Beach, Florida, US. The casino features over 700 slot machines, virtual table games, free to enter poker tournaments and nightly entertainment.

== History ==
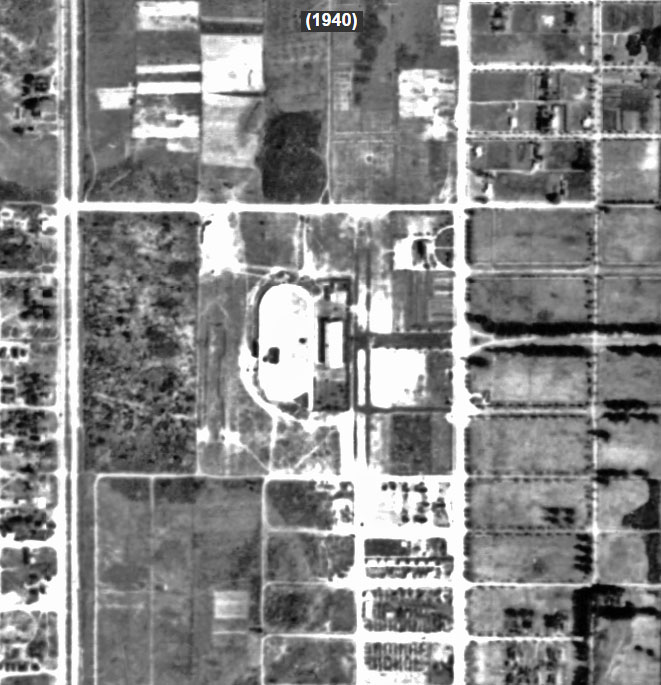
Historic Aerial Photograph of Hollywood Greyhound (Mardi Gras Casino) in 1940

What is now the Big Easy Casino opened as the Hollywood Kennel Club on December 1, 1934, three years after Florida legalized parimutuel betting. A grandstand was added in 1940. In 1974, the facility was reopened as Hollywood Greyhound Track.

A November 2004 statewide referendum allowed Broward County voters to decide whether to allow slot machines at parimutuel facilities located in the county. Broward County voters subsequently approved the use of slots at Hollywood Greyhound and other parimutuels.

An extensive renovation project in 2006 added approximately 1,100 slot machines and a poker room to the dog track, which was renamed Mardi Gras Casino. Two years later, an additional 200 slot machines were added and, in 2009, the Big Easy Poker Room was relocated and expanded. Also included in the renovated facility were a flea market, several restaurants/bars, and a gift shop.

In 2015, the casino made further improvements, which included widening the aisles and opening up Louie's Lounge to the entire casino floor.

In 2017, the facility was closed for two months because of damage from Hurricane Irma.

In 2018, Jeffrey Soffer, owner of the Fontainebleau Hotel, purchased the Mardi Gras Casino from Hartman & Tyner, and renamed it as the Big Easy Casino.

== Casino ==
The casino offers over 70,000 square feet of gaming space, including over 900 slot machines, virtual roulette and blackjack, as well as The Dog Pound, Mardi Gras’ smoker-friendly slot area; simulcast and greyhound racing.

The Big Easy Poker Room, offers over 30 tables of Texas Hold 'em, 7 Card Stud, Omaha and Omaha Hi/Lo. The casino offers low and high limit tables in an effort to accommodate beginner and experienced players.

There are also nightly, free to enter poker tournaments that can be entered and tracked through the Bravo Poker Mobile App.

== Krewe Club ==
The Krewe Club is the casino's membership program. Anyone over 21 can become a Krewe Club member, and will receive $25 bonus play when signing up. The Krewe Club is a tiered membership program that includes purple, gold, black, and platinum levels. As club members play in the casino, they earn points that enable them to move up from purple, to gold, to black, and eventually to the invitation only platinum card. Each level gives the card-holder more exclusive benefits, ranging from free valet service to complimentary tickets to on-site concerts and events.

== Greyhound racing ==
Despite improvements and enhancements over the years, the dog track itself remained relatively the same over the course of its use. Track specifics included:

- Track length: 1,372 feet
- Track width: 22 feet
- Length of stretch: 300 feet
- Composition: Sand and marl
- Timing: Hundredth of a second
- Courses: 550 yards, 660 yards and 770 yards

The last day of racing was May 5, 2018. The casino, which is a supporter of the Adopt-A-Greyhound program, still offers simulcast greyhound racing, harness and thoroughbred racing from tracks across the United States and Canada.

=== Notable races ===
The track is home to four stakes races:

- Mardi Gras Futurity.
- $75,000 Mardi Gras World Classic.
- $10,000 Joe Ryan Jr. Memorial.
- $50,000 American Derby.

2010 Stakes Schedule

The $15,000 Mardi Gras Futurity Qualifying Rounds Begin January 13 & 16 Semi-Final Round January 20 Championship January 23, 2010

Winner: Ls Lafave

Time: 30:60

The $75,000 Mardi Gras World Classic Qualifying Rounds Begin March 10 & 13th Semi-Final Rounds Begin March 17 & 20th Championship March 26, 2010

Winner: Oya Tom Terrific

Time: 30:51

The $10,000 Joe Ryan Jr. Memorial Championship April 2, 2010

Winner: Funnelling Money

Time: 30:16

The $30,000 Hollywoodian Qualifying Rounds Begin April 21 & 24th Semi-Final Rounds Begin April 28 & May 1 Championship May 8, 2010

Winner: Crispins Place

Time: 37:55

=== Hollywood World Classic winners ===
List of Hollywood World Classic winners
Date	Champion	Time (seconds)
March 1, 1975	Can't Decide	31.57
February 28, 1976	Bashful Guy	30.65
March 5, 1977	Downing	30.72
March 4, 1978	Cousin's Elite	31.01
March 3, 1979	Enisled	31.58
March 1, 1980	Banker Hap	30.85
March 21, 1981	MKC Lorine	31.34
March 12, 1982	Lantana Glamour	31.39
March 11, 1983	For Real	31.22
March 10, 1984	My Unicorn	30.79
March 8, 1985	Magnificat	31.05
March 8, 1986	Cajun Pay Off	30.62
March 7, 1987	Prince Proper	30.48
March 4, 1988	My Azalian	30.50
February 25, 1989	Warm Mission	30.64
March 3, 1990	Hello Higsbee	30.66
March 2, 1991	Briggs Stratton	30.77
March 7, 1992	Briggs Stratton	31.24
February 20, 1993	By Tar	30.73
February 26, 1994	Great Son	30.80
February 25, 1995	Follies Bergiere	30.90
March 15, 1996	Dunagree	30.52
March 14, 1997	Bomb Threat	30.22
March 13, 1998	Wigwam Hoss	31.16
March 27, 1999	Kelsos Kingpin	30.90
March 10, 2000	System Ax Friend	31.14
March 9, 2001	Kiowa Shawnee So	30.54
March 15, 2002	Flying Earhardt	30.26
March 14, 2003	Ea's Itzaboy	30.31
March 14, 2004	Ea's Itzaboy	30.27
March 15, 2005	Hallo West Acre	30.34
April 1, 2006	Kiowa Cruzechamp	30.29
March 31, 2007	Flying Stanley	30.06
March 29, 2008	Starz Jenko	30.30
March 27, 2009	Yahoo Omar	30.19
March 26, 2010	Oya Tom Terrific	30.51

== Dining ==
Dining options at the facility offer a mix of Cajun and American cuisine, ranging from fast casual to upscale, including:

- Trifecta Grille & Bar, serving everything from burgers and hot dogs to regional favorites like empanadas, taquitos and plantain chips. Trifecta has it all including draft beer now on tap and a full liquor bar.
- Bonjour Cafe, featuring a wide variety of fresh-baked pastries and tempting desserts are complemented by all day breakfast bites and bistro style sandwiches.
- Le Royale, an ample selection of delicious appetizers, bar bites, burgers, salads and steaks
- The French Quarter, which is the casino's signature restaurant. Enjoy our regional menu of salads, steaks and seafood. American fare with a touch of New Orleans.

== Entertainment events ==
The property has several entertainment venues that host nightly performances and year-round events, including concerts, stand-up comedy, dance competitions, and MMA fights.

== See also ==
- List of casinos in Florida
