= Leroy's Horse & Sports Place =

Defunct American sports book company

- Company type: Private (until 1996); Public (1996-2012)
- Industry: Gambling industry
- Founded: 1978 in Las Vegas, Nevada
- Founder: Leroy Merillat
- Defunct: 2012
- Fate: Acquired and rebranded by William Hill
- Headquarters: Las Vegas, Nevada, United States
- Area served: Las Vegas
- Products: Sportsbook
- Parent: American Wagering

Leroy's Horse & Sports Place, also known as Leroy's Race and Sport Book or simply Leroy's, was an operator of sports books in Nevada. As of 2012, it had 72 race and sports books and kiosks. It was based in Las Vegas. Leroy's parent company, American Wagering, was purchased by British bookmaker William Hill in 2012, and its locations were rebranded under the William Hill name.

== History ==
=== Inception & expansion (1978–1996) ===
In 1978, businessman Leroy Merillat bought a sportsbook in a strip mall in Downtown Las Vegas, and named it "Leroy's" after himself. The following year, Nevada gaming regulators found Merillat unsuitable for licensing because of questions about the propriety of a land deal in California, and he was forced to sell the business. Merillat sold the operation to his son-in-law, Vic Salerno, in 1979.

Nevada sportsbooks at the time were predominantly independent operations, rarely found in casinos. Around 1983, the popularity of sportsbooks began to boom and they started to become more common in casinos. Salerno developed one of the first computerized sportsbook management systems to make his operation more efficient and able to compete with the large casinos.

In 1984, Salerno and two partners formed CBS Computer Systems to market their system to other sportsbook operators. The company, which shared the building with Leroy's, was soon providing systems to almost all of Las Vegas's bookmakers. They sold CBS in 1989 to United Tote for $3.5 million.

In June 1989, Nevada law was changed to allow outside operators for casino sportsbooks, and Leroy's quickly took advantage of the new law by beginning to open branches in casinos. By 1992, Leroy's was the only independent sportsbook in the state, and had branches operating in 30 casinos.

=== As publicly traded company (1996-2012) ===
Leroy's was placed under a holding company, American Wagering, Inc. (AWI), and made its initial public offering in May 1996. Leroy's had 35 locations at the time. The funds raised in the IPO were used to complete the purchase of a 150-room Howard Johnson's hotel and casino near the Las Vegas Strip, which the company planned to remodel as a sports-themed resort.

In October 1996, AWI bought CBS back from Autotote Corp. for $3 million, and renamed it as Computerized Bookmaking Systems.

AWI agreed in April 1997 to buy Imagineering Systems, a maker of keno systems, for $3 million, but canceled the deal in September 1997, deciding instead to build a progressive keno system in-house. Imagineering sued AWI for breach of contract, and was eventually awarded $1.2 million. Meanwhile, AWI launched The Game, a keno offering with progressive jackpots linked to multiple casinos, in August 1999. The company closed its keno operations in 2002.

In July 1997, AWI and International Game Technology jointly launched MegaSports, a parimutuel sports betting system offering high-value progressive jackpots to bettors at Leroy's and other Nevada sportbooks. The company shut down the project in 2000.

AWI, through an Australian subsidiary, launched an online site offering race and sports betting under the MegaSports name in 1999. The site accepted wagers worldwide, except from bettors located in the United States. It was believed to the first online gambling venture by a company licensed in Nevada. Trouble arose, however, later that year, when the Nevada Gaming Commission accused MegaSports of accepting bets from an agent located in Las Vegas who went through a Canadian Internet provider. AWI was ultimately forced to sell the site, or risk losing its Nevada gaming license. MegaSports was sold in July 2002 to Eurast Ltd. of Perth for $2.8 million.

The Howard Johnson's hotel was sold in July 1999 for $4.3 million.

Michael Racusin, a financial consultant who assisted with the IPO, filed a lawsuit claiming he was not paid his full fee. After a court awarded him $1.3 million in July 2003, American Wagering was forced to file for Chapter 11 bankruptcy protection. Youbet.com attempted to buy the company out of bankruptcy for $9.5 million, but eventually withdrew its offer. The company emerged from bankruptcy in March 2005, with most debts having been paid in full, and shareholders retaining their equity in the company.

The company acquired Sturgeon's Inn & Casino in Lovelock, Nevada in March 2006 for $1.8 million.

In 2007, Leroy's began opening sports betting kiosks at its casino locations, allowing patrons with established accounts to place bets at all hours of the day. The following year, the kiosks began being installed in bars and taverns as well.

The company began releasing mobile betting applications for smartphones in 2010, which proved popular.

In June 2012, British bookmaker William Hill bought American Wagering for $18 million, along with Lucky's Race & Sports Book and the satellite sportsbook operations of Club Cal Neva. Salerno was named chairman of William Hill U.S., overseeing 55 percent of the state's sportsbook locations, all of which were rebranded under the William Hill name.

== Locations ==
As of 2012, Leroy's operated sportsbooks and kiosks at 72 locations, including:

- Avi Resort & Casino
- Buffalo Wild Wings (9 locations)
- Colorado Belle
- Dini's Lucky Club
- Edgewater Hotel and Casino
- Ellis Island Casino & Brewery
- Golden Gate Hotel & Casino
- Gold Spike Hotel and Casino
- Gold Strike Hotel and Gambling Hall
- Hacienda Hotel & Casino
- Hooters Casino Hotel
- Hotel Nevada and Gambling Hall
- Klondike Sunset Casino
- Lucky Club Casino and Hotel
- Opera House Casino
- Poker Palace
- Railroad Pass Casino
- Red Garter Casino
- Siena Reno
- Silver Nugget
- Silverton Las Vegas
- Skyline Hotel and Casino
- Stagecoach Hotel & Casino
- Tropicana Express Hotel and Casino
- Wendover Nugget
- Westin Casuarina
