= Klondike Hotel and Casino =

Hotel & Casino

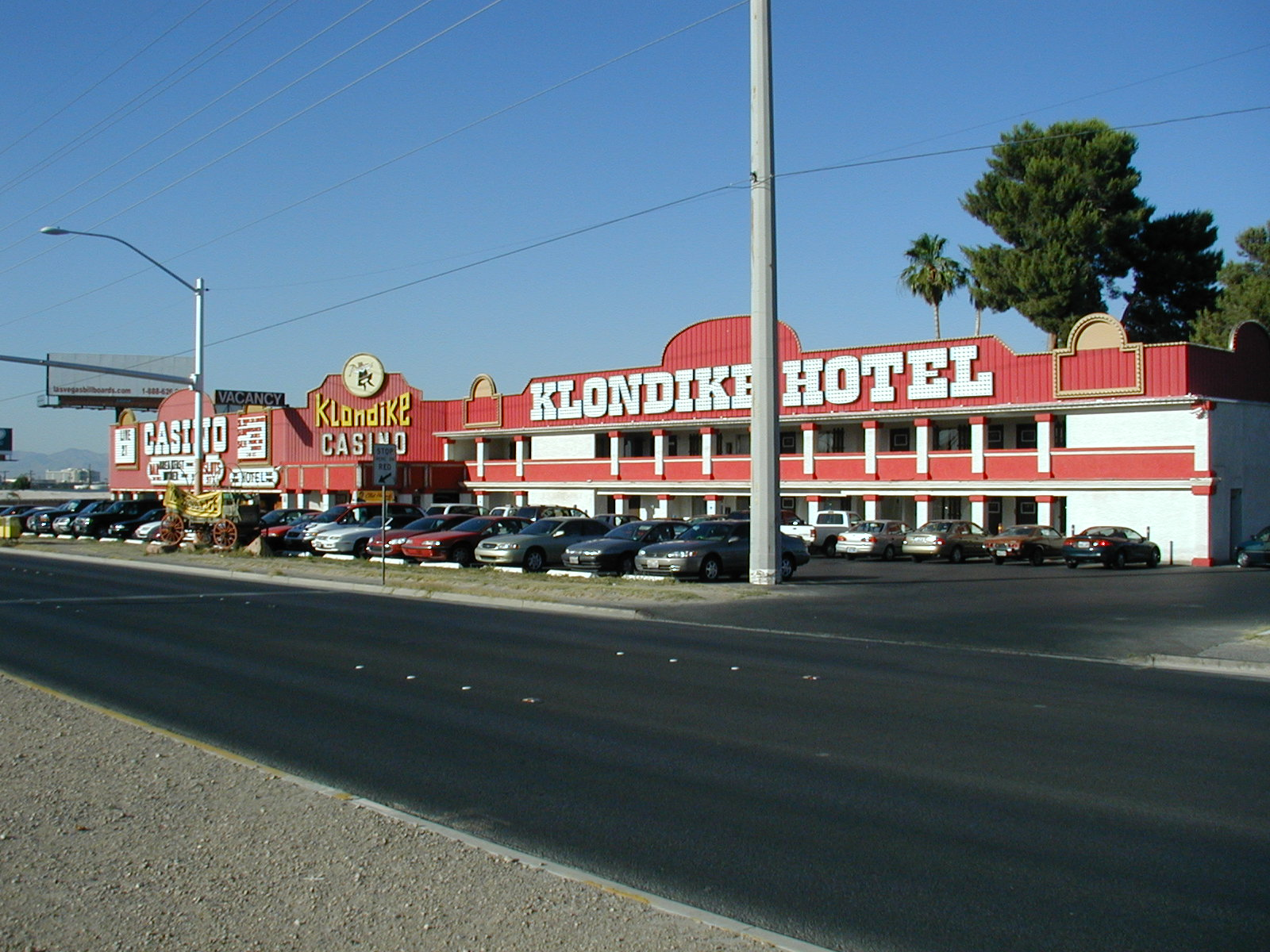

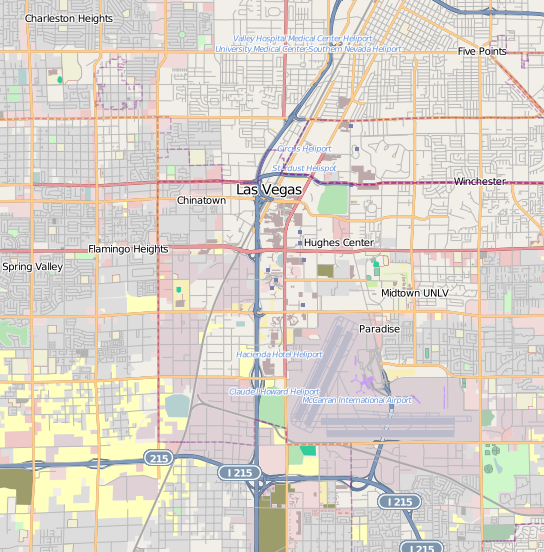
- Location within Las Vegas Boulevard Location within Nevada
- Interactive map of Klondike Hotel and Casino
- Location: Paradise, Nevada; 5191 S Las Vegas Blvd; 36.083295°N 115.172212°W
- Opened: 1962
- Closed: June 30, 2006; 20 years ago
- Theme: Western
- No. of rooms: 153
- Gaming space: 7,700 sq ft (720 m^{2})
- Casino type: Land-based
- Owner: John Woodrum
- Previous names: Kona Kai Motel
- Renovated in: 1973; 1982

Klondike Hotel and Casino (also known as Klondike Inn) was a hotel and casino located on the Las Vegas Strip in Paradise, Nevada, in the United States. The property began as the Kona Kai Motel in 1962, and was purchased by Ralph Engelstad in 1969. The motel was sold to John Woodrum, who renamed it as the Klondike Inn in 1976. A casino was eventually added, and the Klondike became popular among local residents. In 2005, the Klondike was sold to Royal Palm Las Vegas, which planned to replace it with a casino and condo hotel resort known as Paramount Las Vegas. The Klondike closed in June 2006, and was demolished in March 2008. Royal Palm Las Vegas had difficulty obtaining financing for the Paramount project, and the land was put up for sale later in 2008. A Harley-Davidson dealership opened on the former Klondike property in 2014.

The hotel sat on 5.29 acres (2.14 ha) of land on Las Vegas Boulevard, between the Welcome to Fabulous Las Vegas sign and McCarran International Airport. The Klondike was the southernmost hotel on the Las Vegas Strip until its closure. Mandalay Bay is now the southernmost hotel. Woodrum also operated a sister property, the Klondike Sunset Casino, in nearby Henderson, from 1999 until his death in 2014.

== History ==
=== Kona Kai Motel (1962–1976) ===
The Klondike initially opened in 1962 as the Tiki/Hawaiian-themed Kona Kai Motel, located at 5191 South Las Vegas Boulevard on the Las Vegas Strip. In May 1964, the Kona Kai opened a lounge and restaurant known as Talk O' the Town. Later that year, the lounge and restaurant was renamed Robin's, after co-owner Robin Criswell. In June 1965, Sonny Morris reopened the restaurant and lounge as Sonny's Restaurant. The motel was robbed of $640 in September 1965.

Ralph Engelstad purchased the motel in 1969, using money from a $2 million sale of the North Las Vegas Air Terminal to Howard Hughes. The following year, Engelstad received approval to add several slot machines to the motel's tavern. In 1973, four motel buildings from Engelstad's other Las Vegas Strip property, the Flamingo Capri motel, were relocated and converted into a one-story motel building for the Kona Kai.

=== Klondike (1976–2006) ===
Katsumi Kazama, a business partner of John Woodrum, purchased the land in September 1975, and the property remained under the ownership of the Kazama family for the next 30 years, while Woodrum owned the motel. Woodrum, a former business partner of Bill Boyd, took over operations of the motel on May 12, 1976, and it was renamed that year as Klondike Inn. In 1976, Woodrum provided a power line to the nearby Welcome to Fabulous Las Vegas sign, which had not been lit for several years. The county later provided power to the sign. People frequently parked at the Klondike and ran across the street to take pictures of the Las Vegas welcome sign.

The Klondike received a gaming license in 1982, and ultimately became known as the Klondike Hotel and Casino, while retaining the Klondike Inn name. The Klondike included a western theme, and was the first hotel-casino encountered by people travelling north on the Las Vegas Strip. The hotel contained 153 rooms, and the casino measured 7,700 sq ft (720 m^{2}). The Klondike was popular among local residents and was known for its cheap restaurant specials and cheap gambling, while the hotel was popular for its low room rates. According to Woodrum, approximately 90 percent of the Klondike's customers were local residents. In its later years, the hotel's clientele included out-of-town construction workers. Bob Stupak, a longtime friend of Woodrum, was a frequent customer at the Klondike, as well as singer Tom Jones.

By 1997, Woodrum had declined several offers to purchase the Klondike. At that time, the casino included five table games and 450 slot machines. In 2000, Woodrum stated that Clark County wanted to demolish aging motels on the southern Las Vegas Strip for new megaresorts. Regarding the Klondike, Woodrum said, "It's a little ragged and not what they'd like to see on Las Vegas Boulevard and I understand this. But there isn't one of us left that wouldn't fight until our last breath." In September 2004, Leroy's Horse & Sports Place began operating a sportsbook at the casino.

In May 2005, Royal Palm Las Vegas LLC – a subsidiary of the Boca Raton-based Royal Palm Communities – bought 5.25 acres of land adjacent to the Klondike for $42 million. In September 2005, the Klondike and its 5.29 acres were sold to Royal Palm for $23.7 million, for a total of 10.5 acres. Woodrum acknowledged one reason for the sale being that the Klondike would not be able to compete with new, larger resorts. Another reason for the sale was the Klondike's rising property taxes, which had doubled in recent years. The Woodrum family continued to operate the Klondike through an open-ended lease, while a closing date initially remained undetermined. Woodrum stated that the Klondike had remained financially successful but that, "Like anything else, progress takes its toll […]. You can only stand in the way of it so long and it rolls over you."

The casino closed on June 28, 2006, while the hotel, restaurant and bar closed on June 30, 2006. The Klondike had 45 employees at the time of closure, down from 150 employees three months earlier. Many employees from the Klondike were expected to be transferred to Woodrum's Klondike Sunset Casino in nearby Henderson. Shortly after its closure, the property was used for training by the K9 unit of the Las Vegas Metropolitan Police Department. The Klondike's replacement would have been called Paramount Las Vegas. The new resort, initially expected to cost $1 billion, would have included an 1,864-room condo hotel and 80,000 sq ft casino. Plans for the new resort were approved by Clark County in October 2006, but Royal Palm Las Vegas did not expect to begin construction in the near future. Plans for the project were delayed in late August 2007, when an investor pulled out shortly before closing on restructuring a land loan.

By September 2007, homeless people were living in the abandoned motel rooms of the Klondike. Royal Palm Las Vegas LLC was ordered by Clark County to either demolish the buildings by November 13, 2007, or repair them by December 18, 2007. County officials considered the Klondike dangerous because of deterioration, which put its second floor at risk of collapsing. The Klondike was boarded up in November 2007. By January 2008, plans for the Paramount project were uncertain as Royal Palm Las Vegas had difficulty obtaining financing, due to a tightening credit market. Demolition of the Klondike began around March 17, 2008, and concluded on March 20, 2008. The land was put up for sale in May 2008, at a price of $18 million per acre. In May 2013, plans for a Harley-Davidson dealership were announced, to be built on the former land of the Klondike. The two-story, 55,000 sq ft (5,100 m^{2}) dealership, built at a cost of $18 million, opened on the site in October 2014.

== In popular culture ==
The Klondike appears in the 1997 film Vegas Vacation, in which the character of Clark (Chevy Chase) plays unusual gambling games to win his money back.

The Klondike also appears in the 2005 film Miss Congeniality 2: Armed and Fabulous. In 2005, Avenged Sevenfold filmed a portion of the music video for their song, "Bat Country", inside one of the Klondike's motel rooms.
