= The Nevada Independent =

Non-profit news organization covering politics and public policy in Nevada

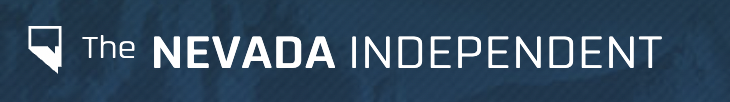

- The homepage of the newspaper on May 11, 2025
- Type: Nonprofit
- Format: Online
- Owner(s): Nevada News Bureau, Inc.
- Founder(s): Elizabeth Thompson; Jon Ralston
- Publisher: Jon Ralston (CEO)
- Editor: Michelle Rindels; Riley Snyder
- Managing editor: Hali Bernstein Saylor
- Staff writers: Senior Reporter; Howard Stutz Reporters; Gabby Birenbaum; Amy Alonzo; Tabitha Mueller; Rocío Hernández; Eric Neugeboren; Isabella Aldrete
- Spanish Language Editor: Luz Gray
- Founded: 2017
- Political alignment: Nonpartisan
- Headquarters: 7455 Arroyo Crossing Parkway; Las Vegas, Nevada 89113
- Website: thenevadaindependent.com

The Nevada Independent (also, The Indy) is a nonprofit, digital-only newspaper covering Nevada based in the Las Vegas area. In addition to general interest stories, The Nevada Independent specializes in government and politics journalism and reports year-round on the state government, the biennial meetings of the Nevada Legislature, county commissions and municipalities.

According to Form 990 tax filings with the IRS, The Indy received 76.54% of its funding from public support in 2023, a slight decrease from 79.14% in 2022.

== History ==
The foundation under which The Nevada Independent operates was founded in 2010, but revived in 2016, by Elizabeth Thompson alongside political analyst and commentator Jon Ralston. It began with a staff of seven. According to its 2023 tax filings, it now has a staff of 31.

Ralston and Thompson cited a need for independent news coverage in the context of major changes in Nevada.

These changes included the retirement of U. S. Senate Majority Leader Harry Reid of Nevada and major political influencer in the state. Along with political power shifts as a result, there was a major consolidation of news media in Nevada including the controversial and at-first secretive 2015 purchase of the Las Vegas Review-Journal by casino billionaire and ardent Donald Trump supporter Sheldon Adelson along with the decades-long decline of the Las Vegas Sun, the only other daily newspaper in the Las Vegas Valley.

The founding board and editorial team included journalists such as CBS-affiliate KLAS-TV's news anchor Paula Francis and news division head Bob Stoldal as well as the Las Vegas Review-Journal columnist John L. Smith.

The Nevada Independent has expanded its newsroom over time, adding coverage areas such as health care, education, environment, and gaming.

In 2024, the outlet also began a formal content-sharing agreement with the Associated Press and KUNR in partnership with the University of Nevada, Reno.

The Nevada Independent hosts public engagement fundraising events including IndyTalks featuring discussion-format, on-stage interviews and an annual policy conference known as Indy Fest. Both events feature elected officials, businesspeople, and other prominent community members.

== Coverage ==
Significant reporting includes investigations into Nevada political figures, such as Storey County Sheriff Gerald Antinoro's ethics violations, the Nevada Attorney General's investigation into fake elector certificates in the 2020 presidential election, and safety violations at Nevada Gold Mines.

== Funding ==
Its funding model relies primarily on donations, foundation grants, and limited sponsorships. Major donors include the Engelstad Foundation, Arnold Ventures, and the American Journalism Project. The outlet maintains a transparent list of donors publicly available on its website.

== See also ==
- Institute for Nonprofit News (member)
- List of newspapers in Nevada
