= Klondike Sunset Casino =

Casino in Nevada, United States

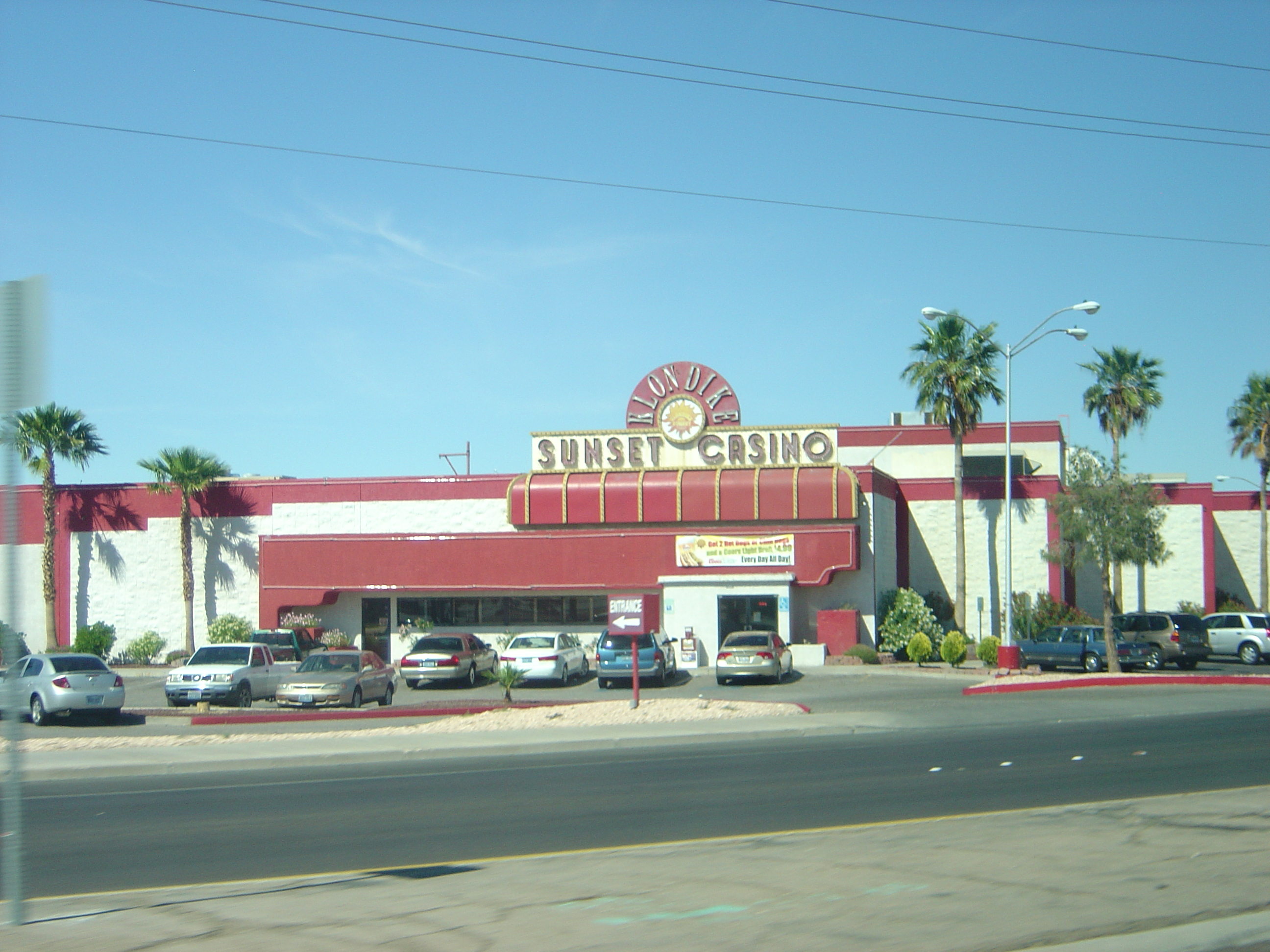
- Klondike Sunset Casino in 2010
- Interactive map of Klondike Sunset Casino
- Location: Henderson, Nevada; 444 West Sunset Road; 36.063995°N 115.015015°W
- Opened: August 2, 1989
- Gaming space: 7,700 sq ft (720 m^{2})
- Casino type: Land-based
- Owner: Bruce Familian and Jon Athey
- Previous names: Tom's Sunset Casino (1989–1998)
- Renovated in: 1993; 1998–1999; 2016
- Website: www.klondikesunset.com

Klondike Sunset Casino is a locals casino located on 2.2 acres (0.89 ha) of land at 444 West Sunset Road, west of Boulder Highway, in Henderson, Nevada.

It was initially owned by Tom Yarbrough, who opened it as Tom's Sunset Casino on August 2, 1989. The casino closed in January 1998, due to financial losses and new competition. John Woodrum purchased the casino and reopened it as the Klondike Sunset Casino in October 1999, after a $5 million renovation. The casino was a sister property to Woodrum's Klondike Hotel and Casino on the Las Vegas Strip in nearby Paradise, Nevada.

After Woodrum's death in 2014, the casino was closed and sold to Carl Giudici, whose plans to renovate and reopen the casino failed to materialize. Bruce Familian and Jon Athey purchased the casino in December 2015, and reopened it on August 3, 2016, after an eight-month renovation.

== History ==
=== Tom's Sunset Casino (1989–1999) ===
In July 1988, Southwest Equities was approved for a limited gaming license for Tom's Sunset Casino, with 243 slot machines and five table games. Shortly thereafter, ownership was transferred to Yarlow, Inc., owned by Thomas Yarbrough, who had to apply for a new gaming license to operate the casino. By that point, new ordinances had been passed which would require the construction of a 200-room hotel to meet approval for a limited gaming license. In July 1989, a city attorney recommended that Yarbrough be approved for a limited gaming license despite the new ordinances, as the property had already been approved prior to the changes. However, the casino would have to add 120 hotel rooms if it were to expand, according to the ordinances.

Tom's Sunset Casino opened on August 2, 1989, with over 240 slot machines and a restaurant. The casino featured the Sunset Slot Seekers club, and was the only Henderson casino to offer a club to regular customers. An official grand opening was scheduled for October 7, 1989. In January 1990, the casino introduced its free "Fun Bus" service. In July 1990, Yarbrough was approved for a 2,993 sq ft (278.1 m^{2}) addition to the casino, which would include the removal of existing buildings already on the property. Possible amenities that would be added in the expansion included a video game arcade, a gift shop, a snack bar, and a sports book.

The renovation, costing more than $1 million, began in May 1993, with the demolition of an east-facing wall. The expansion was to add 3,000 sq ft (280 m^{2}), including a three-story façade, with the third floor being non-functional. Other plans included a 38-foot lighted exterior sign, two new entrances, 100 new slot machines, and a new southwestern theme. A grand reopening was scheduled for August 2, 1993, the casino's four-year anniversary. Other expansions included a horseshoe-shaped bar and a larger lounge. In 1997, the casino offered proposition betting, and was among nine other Las Vegas casinos to offer SportXction, a new interactive betting system.

The casino closed on January 12, 1998, partially because of competition from the new, nearby Sunset Station. For 18 months prior to its closure, monthly profits had declined from $650,000 to $275,000, with a 35 percent decrease in customer attendance. Sports book losses were another reason for the closure, as Yarbrough owed more than $150,000 in sports wagers at the casino and three other sports books that he owned, but lacked the funds to pay off the debts.

Following the closure, 92 employees were laid off. The casino had featured 219 video poker machines at the time, while its small restaurant had become known for its $1.99 breakfast specials. Industry observers felt that the closed casino would need to expand and add amenities such as a pool and hotel in order to compete.

=== Klondike Sunset Casino (1999–present) ===
In September 1998, John Woodrum, a longtime friend of Yarbrough, purchased the property for $1.4 million in a foreclosure auction. That month, Woodrum announced that the casino would be reopened as the Klondike Sunset Casino, which was expected to employ approximately 150 people upon opening. Woodrum hoped to have the casino opened as early as December 31, 1998, although the opening date was contingent on when the casino would receive approval for gambling and liquor licenses. Woodrum's intended New Year's Eve opening was delayed as he awaited approval of a state gaming license. Woodrum invested $5 million to renovate the building, which included an expansion of the casino's bar.

The Klondike Sunset Casino opened on October 1, 1999. It was Woodrum's second casino property, and a sister property to his Klondike Hotel and Casino on the Las Vegas Strip in nearby Paradise, Nevada. Woodrum chose not to add a hotel to the property, opting instead to focus on the locals market. Woodrum's Klondike property on the Las Vegas Strip attracted a clientele consisting mostly of senior citizens and Henderson residents who preferred smaller casinos. Woodrum hoped to attract Henderson residents to his new property with coupons for free food and drinks.

At the time of its opening, the Klondike Sunset Casino consisted of a 15,000 sq ft (1,400 m^{2}) building and featured an Alaskan wilderness theme. The casino, approximately 7,700 sq ft (720 m^{2}), included 360 video poker and slot machines, as well as three blackjack tables and a roulette table. The casino offered $2 minimum blackjack and 25-cent roulette, both considered rare at that time.

At approximately 4:00 a.m. on December 30, 1999, two masked gunmen robbed the casino's change cage and then fled with an undisclosed amount of money. Approximately 30 people were present, many of whom were not aware that it was a robbery until police arrived. Another robbery occurred at approximately 1:45 a.m. on March 21, 2002, when two men armed with handguns and assault rifles took approximately $7,700 from a cashier. A third man was waiting outside the casino in a vehicle. After a short chase, one of the three suspects was apprehended. In February 2004, the casino planned to add a staffed Leroy's sports book. In April 2004, Leroy's was approved to place betting kiosk terminals at the casino. The sports book began operating in June 2004.

The casino was known for its cheap restaurant specials, and appealed to customers who preferred smaller casinos. John Woodrum's son, Michael Woodrum, primarily operated the business. During the 2000s, Michael Woodrum was also a principal owner of the casino, although John Woodrum continued to retain ownership as well. In 2006, Michael Woodrum speculated that the casino's future was financially secure: "The area out here is growing fast and because of ordinances, you're not going to see any more little casinos opening up out here. I think the future's bright." Many employees from the Klondike Hotel and Casino, closed in June 2006, were expected to be transferred to the Klondike Sunset Casino.

By July 2008, the casino was struggling financially due to an economic downturn. The Las Vegas Sun reported that the casino would "be lucky" if it could produce a profit of $5 million that year; it had previously generated $7.5 million two years earlier. The Woodrum family, which spent $1 million to keep the business operational, acknowledged that the casino would probably no longer be around in another decade, as they planned to eventually sell the property when it became valuable enough. At that time, the casino had 300 slot machines and eight table games. In February 2012, the casino was among seven other business cited for a first-time offense of making alcohol sales to minors.

In June 2012, Its Gotta Go LLC filed a lawsuit against Klondike Sunset LLC, claiming the casino's owners breached an agreement from a month earlier to sell the property. Its Gotta Go had agreed to pay $3.56 million for the casino. According to the lawsuit, Its Gotta Go put $100,000 into escrow but faced problems as it was not yet licensed as a casino operator. Its Gotta Go accused the casino's owners of refusing to either agree to a lease agreement to continue operating the casino with its nonrestricted gaming license, or to extend the time for Its Gotta Go to obtain a gaming license.

In February 2013, the casino was found to be in violation of state regulations, as its minimum bankroll was $25,706 short, which could have prevented it from paying off potential customer winnings. As a result, the casino's table games were removed and its number of slot machines was decreased from 300 to 65. The casino's sports book was subsequently closed in June 2013.

John Woodrum died in January 2014. In March 2014, the Nevada Gaming Control Board filed an eight-count complaint against the casino, which was cited for continued violations of failing to maintain a minimum bankroll. Ellen Woodrum – John Woodrum's wife and the current casino owner – reached a tentative agreement that month with the Gaming Control Board to file weekly bankroll reports with the state for a year. A stipulation between Woodrum and the Gaming Control Board was approved the following month.

==== Closure and reopening ====
The casino, still financially struggling, was closed on August 15, 2014, during a pending sale to Carl Giudici's CG Enterprises. Giudici had previously owned many other casinos. The sale was finalized in September 2014. That month, Giudici received approval from the Henderson City Council for the casino to retain its zoning for a nonrestricted gaming business license and for a nonrestricted gaming liquor license for up to a year during its closure, allowing it to remain closed during that period for renovations. Giudici had planned to reopen the casino as The Mint. Giudici's first casino – opened in Sparks, Nevada, in 1984 – was also named The Mint Casino.

In June 2015, Giudici said renovations had been delayed because of recent health problems, which limited his free time. As a result, much of Giudici's time was spent primarily on selling his Club Fortune casino, although he hoped to use the profits from the sale to finish renovations on The Mint. Giudici expected to have the casino reopened on April 2, 2016. Because of unforeseen circumstances, CG Enterprises was unable to proceed with its renovation plans, and sold the casino to Bruce Familian and Jon Athey in December 2015. In March 2016, a $542,000 renovation was being planned.

After an extensive and lengthy renovation, the Klondike Sunset Casino reopened on the night of August 3, 2016, with a special VIP opening held at 6:00 p.m., followed by an opening to the general public at 9:00 p.m. The casino employed approximately 70 people at that time, and exclusively featured slot machines, with no table games. The Klondike Sunset Casino was the first new casino to open in the Las Vegas Valley since the SLS Las Vegas in August 2014. The casino opened with 225 slot machines, and an expanded 24-hour restaurant known as Sarah's Kitchen, named after Familian's wife. A small sports book was expected to open inside the casino in October 2016.

Nevada Gaming Partners LLC, Familian's company which opened and operated the casino, filed for Chapter 11 bankruptcy in November 2016. In October 2017, Nevada Gaming Partners' bankruptcy was converted to a Chapter 7 liquidation due to a halt in a dispute among creditors regarding Familian's continued operation of the casino. After the bankruptcy change, Familian and Las Vegas attorney Brian Shapiro were preparing to sell the casino through an auction but they wanted to keep it open during the process. On November 30, 2017, the Nevada Gaming Commission held an emergency meeting and unanimously approved Shapiro to take over as a bankruptcy trustee for Nevada Gaming Partners and to continue operating the casino, which had been scheduled to close that night and cause the termination of approximately 50 employees. The casino's auction had been scheduled for December 19, 2017. In February 2018, Giudici planned to buy back the casino from Familian, with the sale expected to be complete by March. The casino's long-awaited sports book, operated by William Hill, opened in March 2018.
