= Ralph Engelstad =

American businessman (1930–2002)

- Born: Ralph Louis Engelstad; January 28, 1930; Thief River Falls, Minnesota, US
- Died: November 26, 2002 (aged 72); Las Vegas, Nevada, US
- Known for: Owner of the Imperial Palace hotel-casino

Ralph Louis Engelstad (January 28, 1930 – November 26, 2002) was an American businessman who owned the Imperial Palace casino-hotels in Las Vegas and in Biloxi, Mississippi. He also owned the Kona Kai motel in Las Vegas, which later became the Klondike Hotel and Casino. He was also the donor for the construction of the $104 million Ralph Engelstad Arena for his alma mater, the University of North Dakota in Grand Forks, North Dakota, and another arena bearing his name in Thief River Falls, Minnesota. Engelstad was also a co-developer of the Las Vegas Motor Speedway. Engelstad was one of the very few independent casino-hotel owners in Las Vegas.

== Early years ==
Engelstad was born on January 28, 1930, in Thief River Falls, Minnesota. He was one of five children born to Christian and Madeline (Thill) Engelstad. His grandfather, Peder was a Norwegian immigrant from Vang in Hedmark county.

During high school, Engelstad worked a summer job at AGSCO farm supply company, where his father was a salesman. It was usually long and hard work, taking place on farms and requiring the workers to assemble steel buildings from morning to night.

In 1954, he graduated from the University of North Dakota (UND) with a degree in business. While at UND, Engelstad also played goalie for the school hockey team and even received a tryout with the Chicago Black Hawks. After graduation, he went on to marry Betty Stocker of East Grand Forks. The two went on to have a daughter, Kris.

== Business career ==
In the 1950s, Engelstad founded his own construction company: Engelstad Construction. Engelstad became a millionaire at the age of twenty-nine, fulfilling his hope to become a millionaire by the age of thirty. In 1959, he moved to Las Vegas, Nevada, where his construction company had secured government contracts to build FHA homes.

In 1965, he purchased the Thunderbird Field airport and later acquired vacant land nearby. In 1967, he sold 145 acres, including the airport, to billionaire Howard Hughes for $2 million. Engelstad used the money to purchase the Kona Kai motel on the Las Vegas Strip. He sold the motel in 1975 for $1.2 million, and it would later become the Klondike Hotel and Casino.

In 1971, he purchased the Flamingo Capri Motel, also on the Las Vegas Strip. He added a casino in 1972, and later renamed the property to the Imperial Palace Hotel and Casino in 1979. By 1989, he was worth an estimated $300 million. In 1997, he opened a second Imperial Palace resort in Biloxi, Mississippi.

In 1996, Engelstad joined with Bill Bennett (owner of the Sahara Hotel and Casino) to build the Las Vegas Motor Speedway, which they later sold to Speedway Motorsports in 1998.

After a lengthy affliction with lung cancer, Engelstad died at his home in Las Vegas on November 26, 2002.

== Awards ==
Ralph Engelstad was honored with multiple awards throughout his life, including "National Employer of the Year" from the President's Committee on the Employment of People with Disabilities; "Employer of the Year" from the Southwest Business, Industry and Rehabilitation Association; and "Humanitarian of the Year Award" from the International Gaming & Business Exposition. In 2002, Engelstad was inducted into the North Dakota Entrepreneur Hall of Fame for his contributions to the construction, casino and entertainment industries.

== Controversies ==
=== Nazi sympathism ===
Engelstad was a controversial figure. He raised accusations of being sympathetic to Nazism owing to his collection of Nazi memorabilia stored in a private room, which he referred to as his "war room", within his Imperial Palace hotel-casino. After discovery of the memorabilia, Engelstad agreed to sell it rather than put it on display. In an apology letter to the Jewish Federation of Las Vegas, Engelstad said "I now feel I have done what I can and apologized for what I cannot do". In addition to the memorabilia he stored on display in his "war room", a printing plate was found within his hotel that was used to make bumper stickers that read "Hitler Was Right".

==== Hitler birthday parties ====
On April 20 in 1986 and 1988, he hosted parties to celebrate Adolf Hitler's birthday at his casino in Las Vegas that featured bartenders in T-shirts reading "Adolf Hitler — European tour 1939-45". Because of this, in 1989, the Nevada Gaming Commission fined Engelstad $1.5 million "for actions that damaged the reputation and image of Nevada's gaming industry." Engelstad apologized publicly for the parties, saying they were "stupid, insensitive and held in bad taste", but that was not to be his last controversial move.

=== Fighting Sioux logo ===
Engelstad embroiled himself in the fight over the Fighting Sioux logo when he built a $104 million arena on the University of North Dakota campus for the Fighting Sioux hockey program. Midway in its construction, Engelstad threatened to withdraw funding if the long-standing nickname were to be changed. The logo was placed in thousands of instances in the arena, making the prospect of removal a costly measure. Later, Engelstad placed the stadium under private (rather than University) management and stipulated that the Fighting Sioux motif be kept indefinitely. An Engelstad family trust continues to own the arena and rents it to the University.

The North Dakota Board of Higher Education ruled on April 8, 2010, to retire the Fighting Sioux nickname in response to pressure from the NCAA. On February 8, 2012, the "repeal of the repeal" took place. After 17,213 North Dakota residents signed a petition bringing the debate over the nickname to a statewide vote, UND resumed use of the nickname. On June 14, 2012, the nickname was repealed again after a vote held on June 11, 2012, on whether to keep or retire the nickname resulted in 67.35% of North Dakota voters choosing to retire the "Fighting Sioux" name and American Indian head logo as a result of negative consequences due to impending NCAA sanctions.

== Philanthropy ==
Ralph and his wife, Betty, created the Engelstad Foundation in 2002. Since its inception, the foundation has provided more than $300 million in grants to organizations focused on animal compassion, at-risk individuals, education, historical preservation, medical research and support, people with disabilities and veterans. Notable donations to organizations span Minnesota, Mississippi, Nevada, North Dakota, and Utah.

=== Namesakes ===
- Ralph Engelstad Arena – Arena in Grand Forks, ND, originally known as the Winter Sports Center. Renamed in 1988, and closed in 2001.
- Ralph Engelstad Arena – A new arena in Grand Forks to replace the original. Opened in 2001, and utilized for major music events and University of North Dakota hockey and basketball.
- Ralph Engelstad Arena – Arena in Thief River Falls, MN, opened in 2003.
- Ralph & Betty Engelstad Clubhouse – A part of Boys & Girls Clubs of Southern Nevada, the clubhouse was built in 1994 and is located in central Las Vegas.
- Ralph and Betty Engelstad Campus – The campus in Southwest Las Vegas houses many of Opportunity Village's most vital resources, including the Thomas & Mack Employment Resource Center and the Multi-Purpose Center for Arts & Life Skill Enrichment.
- Ralph and Betty Engelstad School of Health Sciences – The first named school at the College of Southern Nevada, the building is home to multiple health science programs.
- Engelstad Scout Park – Opened in 2016, the Engelstad Scout Park serves as a meeting area for Las Vegas Area Council Boy Scout Meetings.
- Engelstad Family Foundation Event Terrace – Opened in 2018, the Hospitality Hall is home to University of Nevada, Las Vegas' (UNLV) hospitality program.
- Engelstad Family Adoption Center – Opened in January 2019 as part of the Animal Foundation, will serve as a permanent home for safe pet adoptions in Las Vegas.
