= Silver Nugget =

Casino and arena in Nevada, United States

Coordinates: 36.1986°N 115.1240°W

- Interactive map of Silver Nugget
- Location: North Las Vegas, Nevada 89030; 2140 Las Vegas Boulevard North
- Opened: 1964
- Closed: 2023
- Gaming space: 23,000 sq ft (2,100 m^{2})
- Signature attractions: Bowling Center
- Casino type: Land-based
- Owner: Fifth Street Gaming
- Previous names: Mahoney's Silver Nugget Casino
- Website: silvernuggetlv.com

The Silver Nugget was a casino and arena located on Las Vegas Boulevard North in North Las Vegas, Nevada. The casino was owned and operated by Fifth Street Gaming. The casino site covers 14 acres (5.7 ha) and includes a 14,000 sq ft (1,300 m^{2}) arena.

The sports book was operated by Leroy's Race & Sports Book. The casino also offers a bowling center and Bingo.

The casino resumed boxing matches, an old tradition which had not been offered for many years in North Las Vegas. The first fight card was on September 30, 2008, with plans to continue offering matches featuring regional fighters. In 2020 the casino closed down due to the COVID-19 Pandemic. It opened briefly, but due to electrical issues, the casino closed permanently in August 2023.

== History ==
The casino was opened in 1964 by Major Riddle. In 1966, the Silver Nugget became one of the first Las Vegas casinos to have female card dealers. The casino was purchased by Silver Nugget Gaming in January 2007 for $23.8 million, a price that included the Opera House Casino. The company is privately held with Jeffrey Fine as the owner. Fine also owns several Coffee Bean & Tea Leaf locations.

In 2008, the casino sold 12 acres (4.9 ha) of vacant land, which is in the North Las Vegas redevelopment zone, to the North Las Vegas. The casino closed briefly in 2020 due to the COVID-19 pandemic, and closed permanently in 2023.
