= Poker Palace =

Casino in Nevada, United States

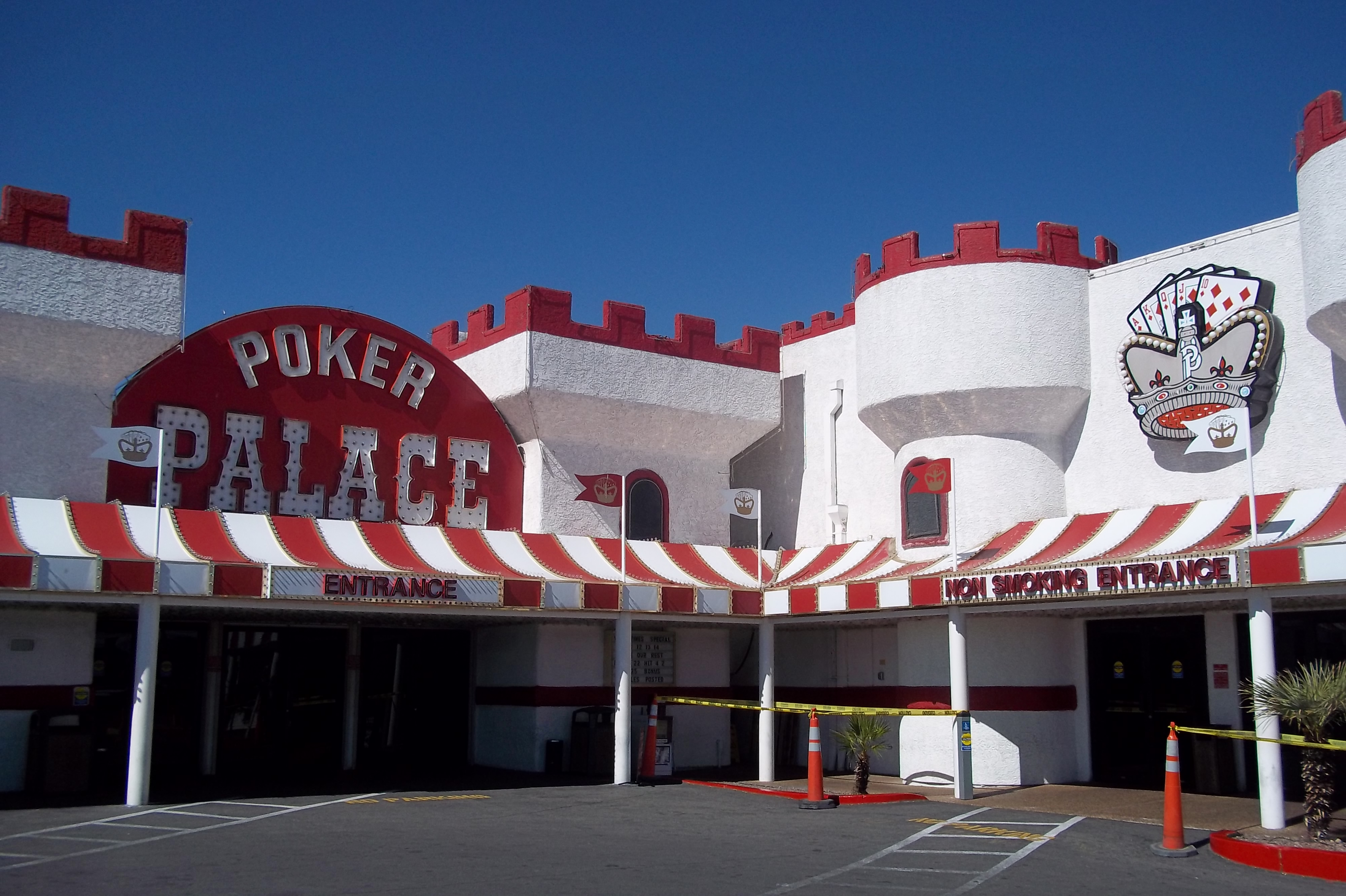
- Poker Palace in 2011
- Interactive map of Poker Palace
- Location: North Las Vegas, Nevada; 2757 North Las Vegas Boulevard; 36.209859°N 115.107274°W
- Opened: 1974
- Gaming space: 25,900 sq ft (2,410 m^{2})
- Notable restaurants: Maddy's Paddy Cafe
- Casino type: Land-based
- Owner: Truckee Gaming; Marvin E. Coleman and Laura Coleman,1974−2025
- Previous names: Bunny's Bar
- Renovated in: 1979; 2000/2001; 2025/2026
- Website: pokerpalace.net

Poker Palace is a locals casino located at 2757 North Las Vegas Boulevard in North Las Vegas, Nevada, near Nellis Air Force Base. Closed for renovations under new ownership in October 2025, the casino is expected to re-open in April 2026 under a new name, Club Fortune North.

== History ==
The property was constructed in 1951. Originally known as the Jet Bar, it was renamed Bunny's Bar in 1955, after owner Bernard "Bunny" Karshen. The bar was popular among employees of the nearby Nellis Air Force Base. In April 1974, Marvin E. Coleman (also known as Mickey Coleman) and his wife, Laura Coleman, purchased 0.48 acres (0.19 ha) of land, including the bar. The Colemans added a casino that year. Measuring approximately 700 sq ft (65 m^{2}), it featured one blackjack table, two pool tables, and eight slot machines. It operated as Bunny's Casino during 1978, and was renamed Mickey's Casino later that year. In June 1979, the Colemans purchased an adjacent 1.38 acres (0.56 ha) of land, directly east of the casino. It was renamed Poker Palace on September 19, 1980.

In 1994, the Poker Palace became the first casino in the Las Vegas Valley to introduce a tax service within the property, an idea that was well received by customers. The concept was initially dismissed by other locals casinos for being unusual, but the Palace Station and Mahoney's Silver Nugget later adopted the idea. In 1997, the Poker Palace was one of nine casinos in the Las Vegas area to offer SportXction, a new interactive betting system. In November 1998, to improve on the image of North Las Vegas, the Colemans opened a new, upscale restaurant at the Poker Palace named Laura's Vineyard. The Poker Palace was one of two Las Vegas casinos to provide sign-up services for SportXction, until the service was suspended in May 2000.

In June 2000, the Poker Palace was approved for a 4,750 sq ft (441 m^{2}) expansion of the property to include a senior citizen bingo hall. Marvin Coleman also planned to construct a 114-space parking lot for employees. In November 2003, it was reported that the Poker Palace's blackjack-like table game was largely tilted toward the casino's advantage. The Poker Palace celebrated its 30th anniversary with a $30,000 giveaway throughout May 2004, with a special anniversary party planned for June 5, 2004.

In late 2006, the Nevada Gaming Control Board launched an investigation into the Poker Palace after sportsbook audits revealed unusually high handle on racing wagers placed at the casino. With the help of an undercover board agent, investigators discovered that three Poker Palace employees engaged in various illegal race book activities. In May 2009, the Poker Palace was fined $250,000 for these activities, while Marvin Coleman was cited for failure to adequately supervise his casino and its employees.

In August 2008, Jeff Haney of the Las Vegas Sun gave the Poker Palace a zero-star rating on his list of the best sportsbooks in Las Vegas, calling it, "An extremely low-limit locals joint. We do mean locals. If you're a tourist and you end up here, you're probably very, very lost."

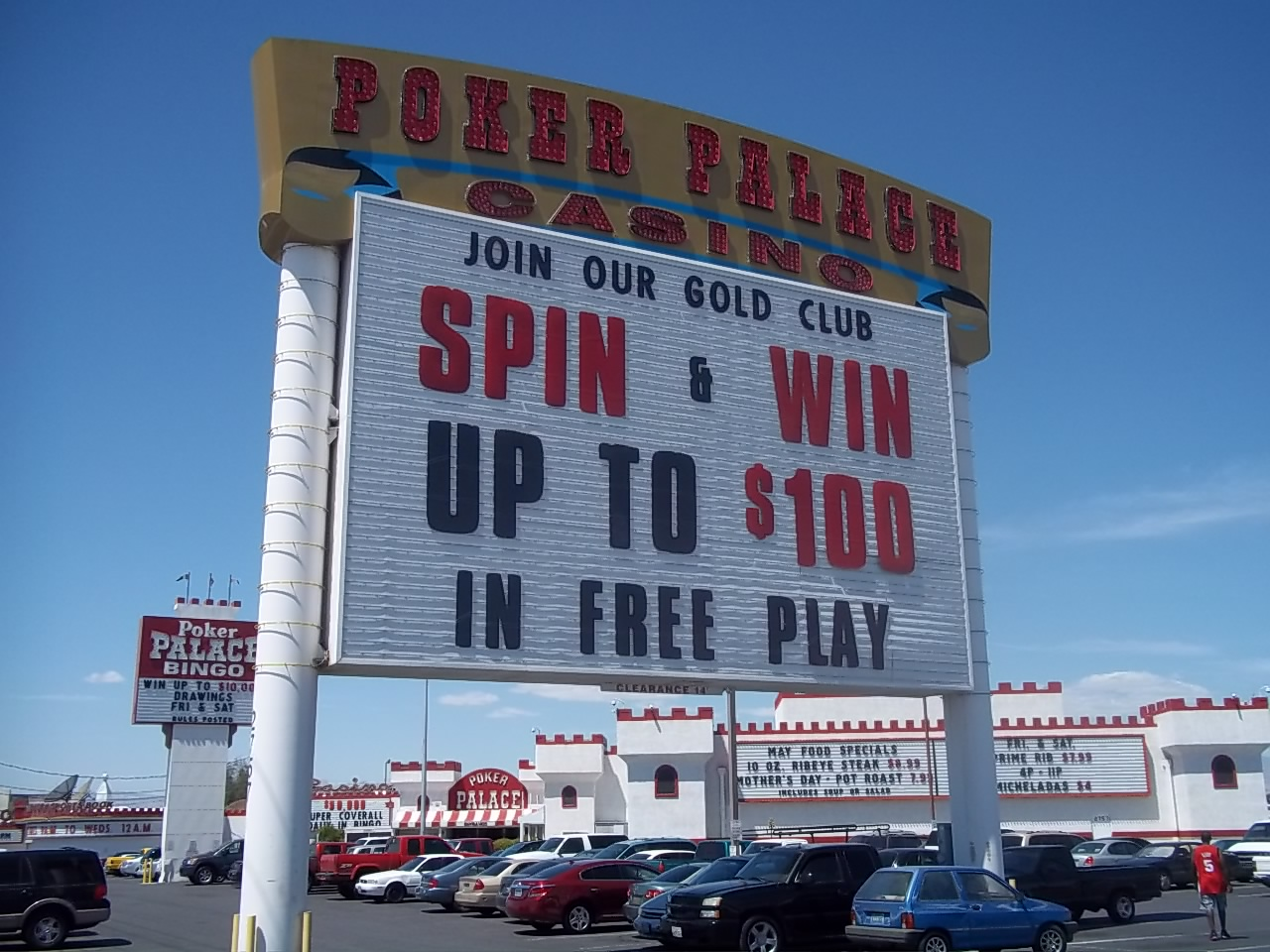
Poker Palace's large sign in 2013.

Maddy's Paddy Cafe, a coffee shop named after the Colemans' grandson, operates inside the Poker Palace. The Poker Palace celebrated its 40th anniversary on April 1, 2014, with a guest appreciation celebration offering complimentary cake and champagne.

On the morning of January 26, 2015, the Poker Palace's large sign caught on fire while having work done. Firefighters were contacted at around 11:00 a.m., and took approximately 10 minutes to extinguish the fire, which destroyed the sign and created a smoke plume that was visible for miles.

As of 2016, the Poker Palace features a 25,900 sq ft (2,410 m^{2}) casino, with 280 slot machines, seven table games, eight poker tables, a 5,000 sq ft (460 m^{2}) bingo hall, and a 1,800 sq ft (170 m^{2}) sportsbook.

Poker Palace closed on September 30, 2025, in conjunction with a sale to Truckee Gaming, which took ownership the next day. The casino is scheduled to reopen in early 2026, following renovations.
