= Engelstad Foundation =

American philanthropic foundation

The Engelstad Foundation
- Abbreviation: ESF
- Formation: 2002; 24 years ago
- Founders: Ralph Engelstad; Betty Engelstad
- Type: Private foundation; 501(c)(3)
- Purpose: Healthcare, Education, Historical preservation
- Headquarters: Las Vegas, Nevada, U.S.
- Region served: United States
- Method: Donations, Grants
- Key people: Betty Engelstad (Trustee); Kris Engelstad (Trustee); Jeffery M. Cooper (Trustee)
- Endowment: $18.2 million (2017)
- Website: Engelstadfoundation.com

The Engelstad Foundation, a nonprofit 501(c)(3) organization, was established in June 2002 to continue the philanthropic efforts of Ralph Engelstad. It was originally developed with the purpose of promoting medical research, improving the lives of people living with disabilities and creating new possibilities for high-risk individuals. The Engelstad Foundation focuses its efforts on education, healthcare, disabled individuals and childhood issues, among other areas. The foundation controls about $800 million in assets and has given over $500 million in grants, scholarships and donations to a number of nonprofits and partners throughout the United States since its establishment.

== History ==
In 1979, Ralph Engelstad opened the Imperial Palace hotel-casino in Las Vegas, Nevada. He received attention for hiring disabled individuals, which was rare at the time. The Engelstad family continued quietly donating to charities and institutions in communities they had connections to. Before he died in November 2002, Ralph Engelstad put a plan into motion to create a foundation that would allow the assets he acquired to be given back after his death. In 2002, Ralph and Betty Engelstad officially formed the Engelstad Foundation with the goal of continuing Ralph's charitable work.

Since its establishment, the Engelstad Foundation has provided more than $500 million in grants to organizations spanning the states of North Dakota, Nevada, Minnesota, Utah and Mississippi. The Engelstad family has history in the markets that the foundation serves. For example, the foundation holds strong ties to Thief River Falls, Minnesota, where Ralph Engelstad was born. There is a strong presence in North Dakota as well – where Ralph Engelstad graduated from the University of North Dakota and met his wife, Betty, during his time in Grand Forks. The foundation’s ties to Mississippi derive from the 1997 opening of the second Imperial Palace in Biloxi, Mississippi. The foundation is currently based in Las Vegas, Nevada, where Ralph Engelstad built his business as an entrepreneur and where the Engelstad family has lived for many years.

In 2022, the Engelstad Foundation celebrated its 20th anniversary and crossed $500 million in giving, providing more than $523 million in funding to nonprofits throughout the United States.

== Leadership ==
Former trustee Betty Engelstad serves the board as Trustee Emeritus. Betty Engelstad, widow of Ralph Engelstad, worked in a bank as a young girl which primed her for the budgeting that she would be doing for both her own family and eventually the Engelstad Foundation. Betty prefers to remain out of the public eye when it comes to the foundation’s giving, but her role in staging the creation of the foundation remains evident.

The Engelstad Foundation is currently run by trustees Kris Engelstad, Jeffrey M. Cooper and Sean Mcgarry.

Ralph and Betty Engelstad’s daughter, Kris Engelstad, also serves as a trustee and CEO for the foundation. In many instances, she is the face of the foundation in the public eye. Jeffrey M. Cooper worked with Ralph Engelstad as his certified public accountant. He also served as treasurer for the Imperial Palace Casino Resort Spa in Biloxi, Mississippi that was owned and operated by Engelstad. Since 2002, his role has also included acting as a trustee on the Engelstad Foundation board. He also serves as the foundation's chief financial officer. Sean McGarry, son of Kris Engelstad, serves as a trustee as well as investment director for the foundation. He is also the founder of 1930 Capital, a Las Vegas investment firm that sources, executes and manages private equity, real estate and other investments.

Erin McGarry, daughter of Kris Engelstad, is the foundation’s chief granting officer, assisting with the foundation’s grant proposal and management process.

== Philanthropy ==
As a foundation that has been granted charitable status, the Engelstad Foundation is required to file IRS 990-PF form annually. In fiscal year ending December 2022, the foundation reported total assets of $826,907,501, revenue of $53,710,352 and charitable disbursements of $52,007,432. The Engelstad Foundation promotes the welfare of others through generous donations to what they believe to be good causes. Donations to organizations focus on various categories including animal compassion, at-risk individuals, education, historical preservation, medical research and support, people with disabilities and veterans.

Organization	Amount ($ millions)
University of North Dakota	127.5
Nevada Cancer Institute	35
University of Nevada, Las Vegas	12.625
Three Square Food Bank	10
The Fulfillment Fund	10
Roseman University of Health Sciences	10
St. Rose Dominican Health Foundation	10
The Smith Center	10
Thief River Falls, Minnesota	10
College of Southern Nevada	8.2
Las Vegas Metropolitan Police Department	8
Boys and Girls Club of Southern Nevada	5
Opportunity Village	9
The Animal Foundation	4.5
Communities in Schools of Nevada	3.2
Blind Center of Nevada	3
St. Jude's Ranch for Children	6.6
Sacred Heart School	2.5
Green Our Planet	2.5
Farm Rescue	2.49

The extent of the organization’s philanthropic endeavors has led multiple associations to honor the foundation.

In 2020, the Engelstad Foundation was honored as Las Vegas Sun VEGAS INC Angel Awards: Foundation of the Year. Kris Englestad was named the CommonSpirit Philanthropist of the Year at CommonSpirit Health’s 12th annual Philanthropy Summit in February 2023. The Engelstad Foundation was honored as a Candlelighters Sustaining Impact Honoree, receiving the Sustaining Community Award for their investment in changing the lives of those in Southern Nevada March 2023.

== Key Partnerships ==
=== Nevada Health and Bioscience Corporation - Kirk Kerkorian School of Medicine ===
Kris Engelstad, of the Engelstad Foundation, formed a donor development limited liability corporation, the Nevada Health and Bioscience Corporation (NHBC), with several Las Vegas philanthropists including MaryKaye Cashman, of Cashman Equipment; Lindy Schumacher, of the Lincy Institute; and Marianne Johnson, of Boyd Gaming.

Through a public-private partnership with the NHBC, the nonprofit organization managed $120 million in philanthropic donations from the Engelstad Foundation, the Lincy Foundation, the Boyd Family Foundation and Bank of America, as well as a $25 million contribution from the state of Nevada to build the Kirk Kerkorian School of Medicine Building at the University of Nevada, Las Vegas.

The school celebrated the grand opening of the building on Oct. 5, 2023. The building was constructed and delivered under-budget and ahead of deadline.

The Engelstad Foundation donated $15 million to construct the Kirk Kerkorian Medical Educational Building.

=== Andre Agassi Foundation for Education - THE BIG IDEA CHALLENGE: An Education Innovation Contest ===
The Andre Agassi Foundation for Education and the Engelstad Foundation partnered to financially back THE BIG IDEA CHALLENGE: An Education Innovation Contest.

In 2022, THE BIG IDEA CHALLENGE was launched as an incubator-type contest that encouraged individuals to submit the creative idea that they believed could transform education in Nevada. The contest awarded grants to three winners to make their ideas a reality. Winners also received assistance from Nevada GrantLab to manage the funding and bring the idea to life.

More than 200 applications for the challenge were accepted from January through March 2022 and the contest awarded a total of $275,000 in grants. Las Vegas high school teacher Ben Nguyen received a $200,000 grant for his "A Platform for the Future" concept that aims to build a platform for localized job shadowing, training, and mentorship. Retired Las Vegas teacher Eleanor Cormier received a $50,000 grant for her Project 300 Early Learning Academy model, an online virtual tutoring program for kindergarteners in urban elementary schools that will aim to strengthen their literacy skills utilizing Common Core State Standards in English language arts. Henderson, Nev. resident Dorothy Blake was awarded a $25,000 grant to expand the Mindful Music Moments program into Nevada by launching a pilot program.

In 2023, THE BIG IDEA CHALLENGE, in its 2nd year, selected three winners that received a total of $500,000 in grants. Las Vegas educators Shardae Chenoweth and Dr. Biante’ Gainous, received $200,000 to grow their Financially Lit platform, an experiential learning opportunity for students to exist within a microeconomy where scholar dollars are the currency. Rhea Watson, with Las Vegas-based Scholarship Solutions, received $150,000 for her “A Scholarship A Day” app that aims to provide students access to college and scholarship information and opportunities. Natalie Adame, Robele Abdi and Nefeli Georgilas, received $150,000 for their SchoolM8 Educational Management web app, which will help students streamline their educational journey in one centralized website.

=== Opportunity Village ===
In 2021, the Engelstad Foundation partnered with Opportunity Village to sponsor the building of Betty’s Village, a $35 million housing project for individuals with special needs. The development initially housed 70 adults and includes amenities, such as a gym and pool for residents.

In the spring of 2023, Opportunity Village announced the plan to construct 100 more housing units with construction set to begin in the spring of 2024 and estimated to take 18 months to two years to complete. The additions will be built on 17.6 acres of land located in northwest Las Vegas. The first phase will include beds and the second phase will have a community center along with more housing. The units at Betty’s Village vary between one and two-bedroom homes and the tenant’s rent is covered by Medicaid. The Engelstad Foundation pledged a $10 million match grant for the expansion. The project is named after Betty Engelstad.

=== Project 150 ===
The Engelstad Foundation partnered with the estate of Kirk Kerkorian to provide a $1.3 million donation to fund the second location for Project 150, a Las Vegas nonprofit that provides resources for high school students in need. The location aims to connect services for thousands of homeless, displaced, and disadvantaged students in Las Vegas.

=== Touro University Nevada ===
The Englestad Foundation has gifted over $8 million Touro University Nevada (Touro University) to fund scholarships, partnership programs, mobile health care outreach, and bench-to-bedside research. The Engelstad Foundation’s partnership with Touro University started with a $1.5 million gift to fund the university’s second mobile healthcare clinic. The foundation went on to provide an additional $4 million gift, which created the school’s first scholarship endowment for our medical students. Of the $4 million gift, $3 million was endowed to provide for student scholarships and $1 million funded additional outreach initiatives for the university’s three mobile healthcare clinics. Additionally, the Touro University Nevada’s Engelstad Research Complex was created with support from the Englestad Foundation’s gifts totaling $1.8 million.

Beginning in 2022, a $1 million grant from the Engelstad Foundation funded the Las Vegas Crisis Response Medical Training Program, led by Touro University. More than 1,200 officers with Las Vegas Metropolitan Police Department have been instructed in lifesaving medical training. The Engelstad Foundation and Touro University also provide the Las Vegas Metropolitan Police Department with individual trauma kits, also referred to as IFAKs, and train on how to use them.

In 2024, Touro University Nevada College of Osteopathic Medicine received $500,000 from the Engelstad Foundation towards cancer research, conducted within the Touro University Nevada’s Engelstad Research Complex, aiming to develop a drug that prevents cancer metastasis.

=== Warrior Pathway Program ===
Announced in February 2024, the Engelstad Foundation partnered with Mike Rowe, creator and host of the TV series Dirty Jobs, and the mikeroweWORKS Foundation, to create the “Warrior Pathway Program.” The four-year program provides approximately $4.5 million in full-ride scholarships, funded by the Engelstad Foundation, to trade schools for students at Western High School in Las Vegas. Students who complete the program through their senior year, will be offered scholarships to two-year or shorter technical training programs. It is estimated that roughly 50 freshman students will have trade school paid for after graduation in 2027.

=== Wave Neuroscience ===
The Engelstad Foundation funded a $1.5 million grant to Wave Neuroscience that will support Wave Neuroscience’s Phase Two clinical trial, which aims to develop and validate treatments for Post-Traumatic Stress Disorder (PTSD) and Traumatic Brain Injury (TBI), currently underway with Texas A&M University Health Science Center (Texas A&M Health) Institute of Biosciences and Technology.
