= Stagecoach Hotel & Casino =

Casino hotel in Nevada, United States

- Interactive map of Stagecoach Hotel & Casino
- Location: 900 E Highway 95, Beatty, NV 89003; 36.9149°N 116.7532°W
- Opened: 1983; 43 years ago
- No. of rooms: 80
- Notable restaurants: Alexander's Steak House, Rita's Cafe
- Casino type: Land
- Website: Stagecoach casino

Stagecoach Hotel & Casino is a hotel and casino located in Beatty, Nevada, USA. It has 80 rooms, two restaurants, a casino with slot machines and table games, and a swimming pool. The Stagecoach is open 24 hours a day and is located on U.S. Route 95.

== History ==
The Stagecoach opened in 1983. with 80 rooms. The Stagecoach is approximately 6 miles from the Goldwell Open Air Museum and 7 miles away from the entrance to Death Valley National Park.
