= Club Cal Neva =

Hotel and casino in Nevada, United States

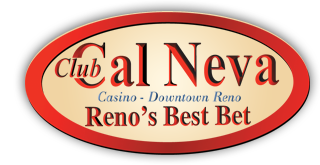

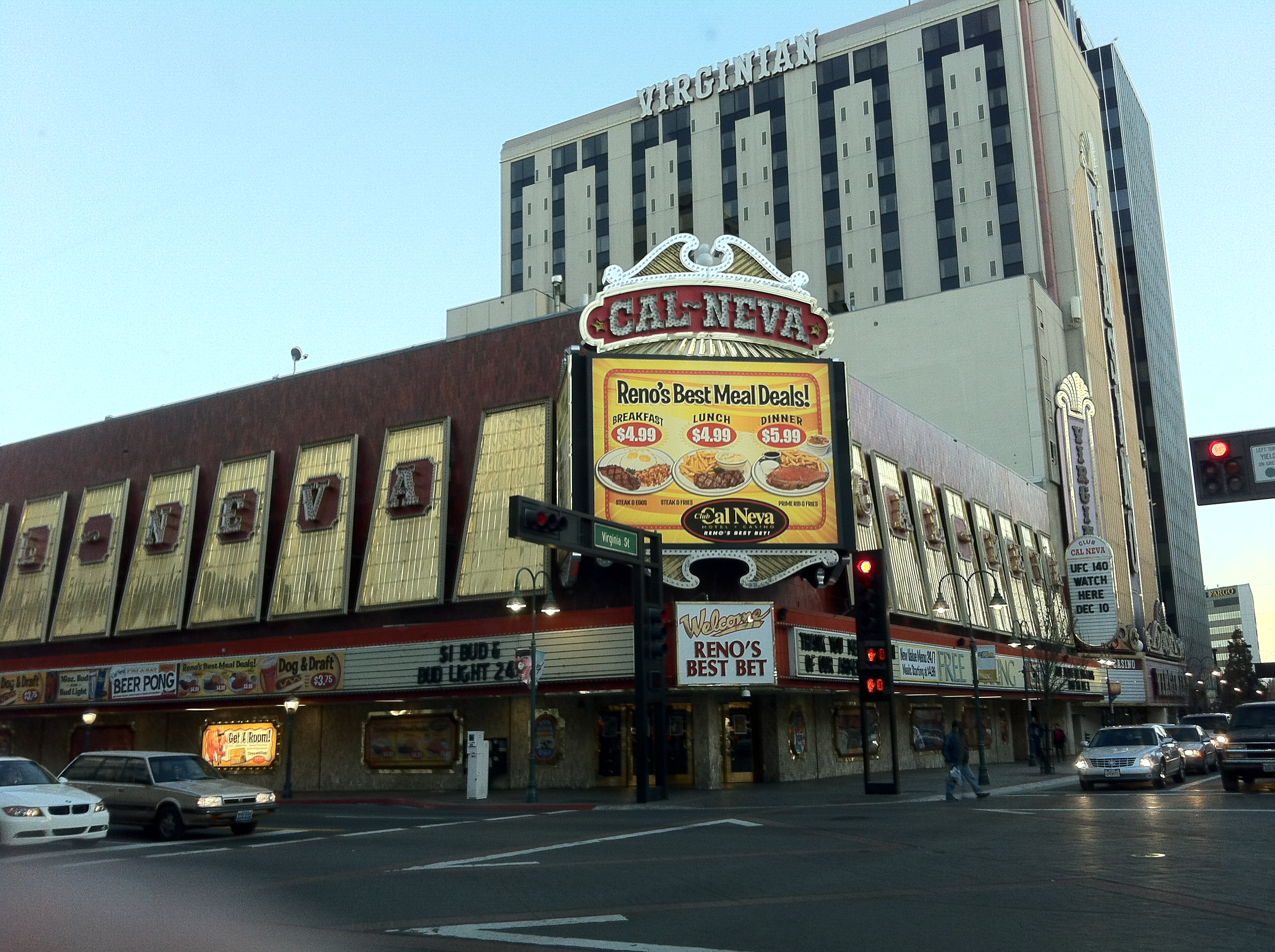
- Interactive map of Club Cal Neva
- Location: Reno, Nevada, U.S.; 38 East Second Street; 39.526729°N 119.812742°W
- Opened: March 30, 1962; 64 years ago
- Theme: Classic
- Gaming space: 36,454 sq ft (3,386.7 m^{2})
- Notable restaurants: Knockout Grille; Steak & Pasta House; The Casino Grill; Top Deck Restaurant
- Owner: Jeff Siri
- Architect: Worth Group
- Renovated in: 1977: Nevadan Tower (operated from 1999 to 2015); 1987: Virginian Tower (operated from 2002 to 2004); 1996: Stadium Parking Garage
- Website: clubcalneva.com

Club Cal Neva is a casino and former hotel located in Downtown Reno, Nevada.

The 36,454-square-foot (3,386.7 m^{2}) casino has 849 slot machines, 41 table games, 3 poker tables and a race and sports book.

== History ==
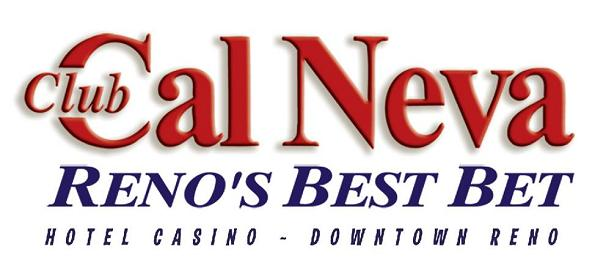
Club Cal Neva logo (1999–2015)

Club Cal Neva is one of the most historic casinos in Northern Nevada, having held its presence in Downtown Reno through all of its monumental changes over the years. Club Cal Neva originally opened on April 2, 1962 as a club held by the gaming magnates of the time. It has avoided closure by changing hands and expanding into the sports betting industry. Its sports book was one of the most profitable in the state and racked in millions per year via satellite participants. In April 2011 William Hill PLC purchased Cal Neva's race and sportsbook division for $39 million. The Club Cal Neva is by no means a large casino but has expanded over the years.

From 2002 to 2004, Club Cal Neva held a lease to the 16 story Virginian Tower which held 125 rooms, it was connected to the Club Cal Neva Casino, the owners declined to renew the lease in 2004 and the hotel was closed, it has not been reopened since October 23, 2004. That same year, Club Cal Neva purchased the old Nevadan tower across the street, it was once its own independent hotel and casino first opening in 1982 as the Onslow Hotel, it closed shortly thereafter and remained dormant until the owners of the Riverboat decided to merge it into their hotel and casino before it closed in 2001. It then sat empty before Club Cal Neva purchased it and poured thousands into a major refurbish. It remained Club Cal Neva's hotel until it was later sold to Siegel Suites on February 5, 2015.

Other notable changes to Club Cal Neva, a parking garage was added in 1996 and more gaming space around this same time. Today, Club Cal Neva remains one of the last remaining of Reno's original casinos. It sponsors some Reno events, including the "La Tomatina en Reno," an homage to the tomato fights in Spain. It drew a turnout of more than 10,000 people in its first run. Club Cal Neva also has 4 restaurants.
