= Opera House Casino =

Casino in Nevada, United States

Coordinates: 36°12′21″N 115°6′46″W

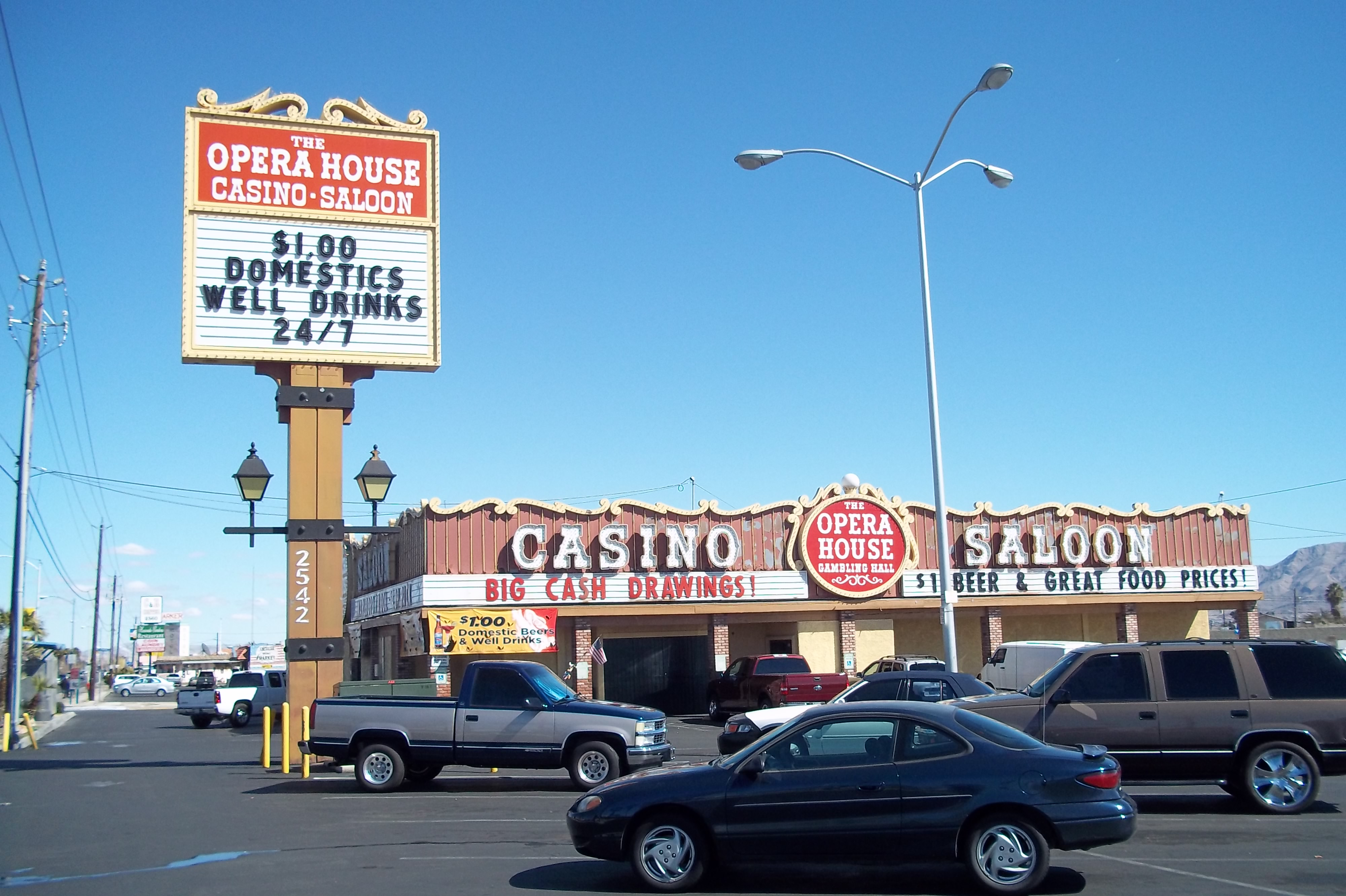
- Interactive map of Opera House Casino
- Location: North Las Vegas, Nevada 89030; 2542 Las Vegas Boulevard North
- Closed: 2014
- Gaming space: 4,420 sq ft (411 m^{2})
- Casino type: Land-based
- Owner: Silver Nugget Gaming

Opera House Casino was a casino located on Las Vegas Boulevard North in North Las Vegas, Nevada. The casino was owned by Silver Nugget Gaming.

== History ==
The casino was purchased, along with the Silver Nugget, by Silver Nugget Gaming in January 2007 for $23.8 million.

In January 2015, an agreement was announced to sell the casino to Nevada Restaurant Services, the parent company of Dotty's.

The casino closed in 2014 and has since been demolished. A Dotty's casino was subsequently built and opened on the property.

This building was the home of the 101 Club, owned by Don Laughlin.
