= Sportsbook =

Sports gambling establishment

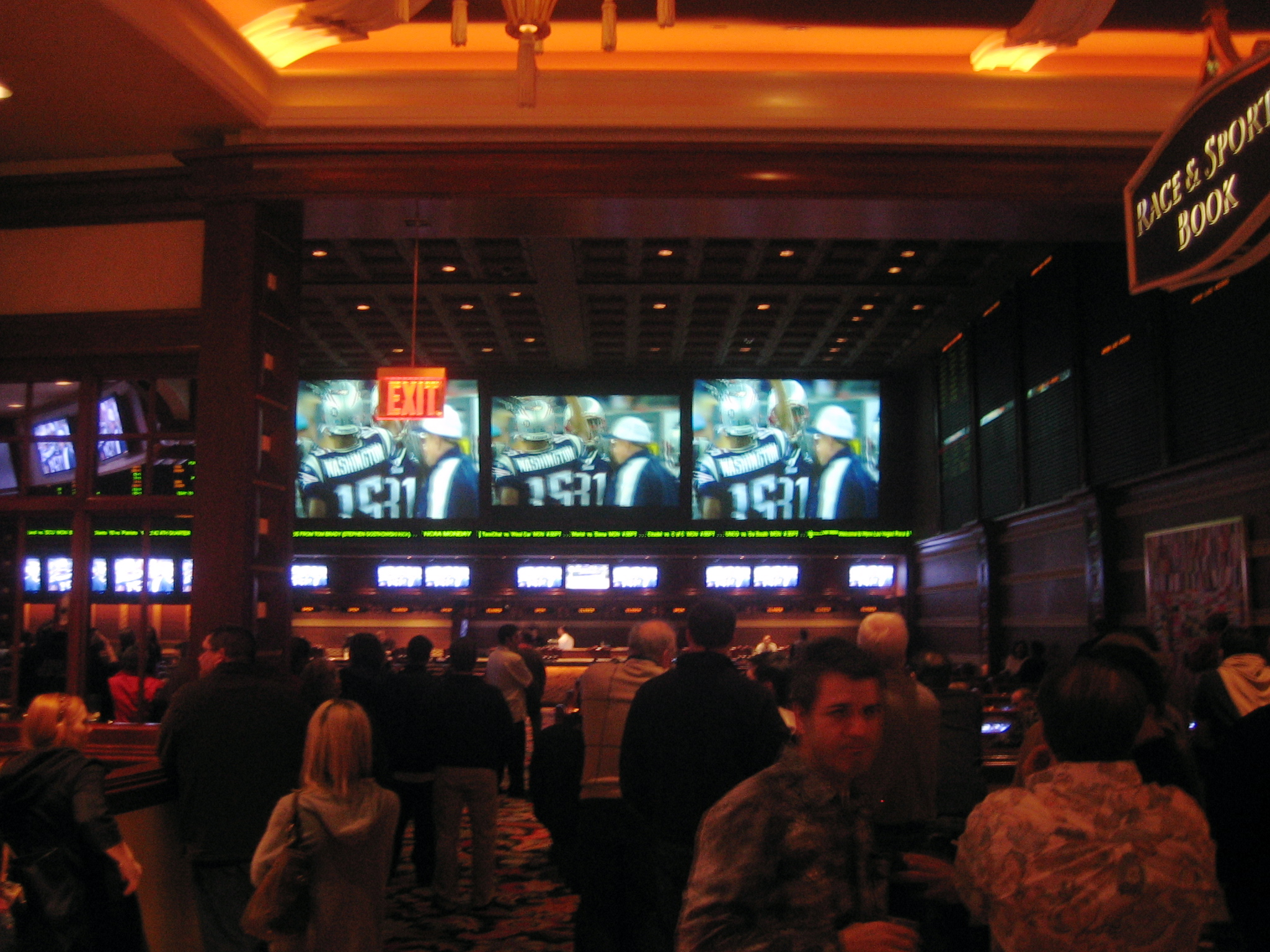
Sportsbook at Wynn Las Vegas, during Super Bowl XLII, February 2008.

A sportsbook is a venue where a gambler can place wagers on sporting events, such as golf, football, basketball, baseball, ice hockey, soccer, horse racing, greyhound racing, boxing and mixed martial arts. The method of betting varies with the sport and the type of game. In the US, the Professional and Amateur Sports Protection Act of 1992 allowed only Nevada, Oregon, Montana and Delaware to legally wager on sports other than horse racing, greyhound racing and jai alai; the law was ruled unconstitutional on May 14, 2018, freeing states to legalize sports betting at their discretion.

Winning bets are paid when the event finishes, or if not finished, when played long enough to become official; otherwise, all bets are returned. This policy can cause some confusion since there can be a difference between what the sportsbook considers official and what the sports league consider official. Customers should carefully read the sportsbook rules before placing their bets.

The betting volume at sportsbooks varies throughout the year. Bettors have more interest in certain types of sports and increase the money wagered when those sports are in season. Major sporting events that do not follow a specific schedule, like boxing, can create peaks of activity for the sportsbooks.

== Nevada ==
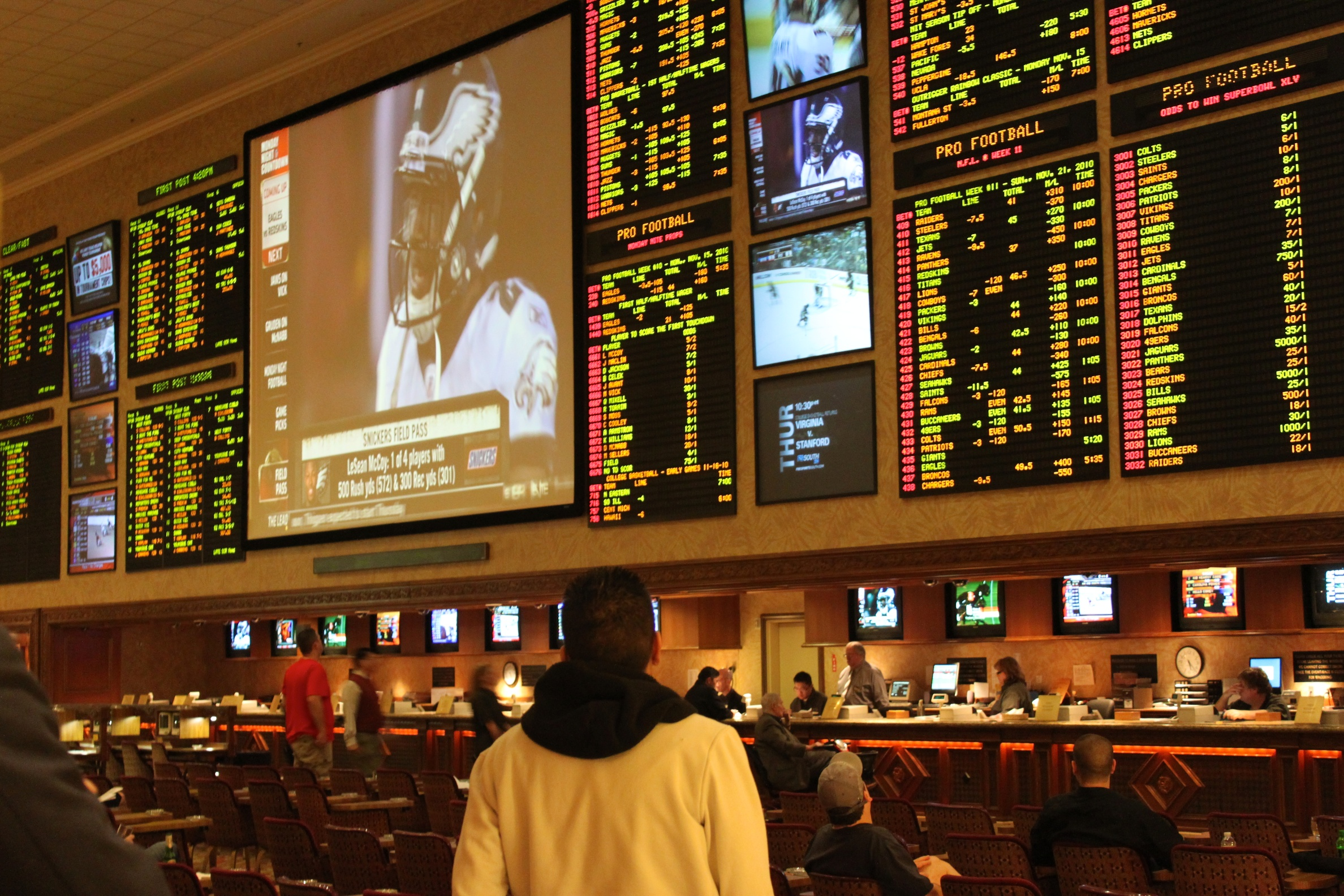
Odds boards at MGM's Mandalay Bay sportsbook, November 2010.

Most of the United States sportsbooks are located in Nevada. In 1949, Nevada allowed bookmakers to accept bets on horse racing and professional sports. The first Nevada sportsbooks were called Turf Clubs. They were independent from the casinos and had an informal agreement with the hotels that they would stay out of the casino business as long as the hotels stayed out of the sportsbook business. The sportsbooks had to pay a 10 percent tax so they charged a high vigorish to gamblers, but they still brought enough business to make a profit.

In 1974 the tax was lowered to 2 percent, in 1983 to 0.25 percent, and in 1975 Frank Rosenthal, who ran the Stardust Casino, convinced legislators to allow sportsbooks in the casinos, and soon nearly all of the casinos added them. The turf clubs were no longer able to compete and eventually all closed.

Nevada casino sportsbooks generally feature betting windows, big screen televisions, interactive betting stations, odds boards (usually computerized), papers with different odds for the day, and places to sit and watch games and races.

Some casinos use third-party operators for their sportsbooks, such as Cantor Gaming, Leroy's, Lucky's, and Club Cal Neva. In 2011, British bookmaker William Hill agreed to buy the Leroy's, the Lucky's, and the Cal Neva chains, which would give it control of 115 of the state's 183 books.

The Super Bowl is the most popular event for the Nevada sportsbooks. They earned $7.2 million on the $99 million wagered on it in 2013. Because it attracts many unsophisticated bettors, as of January 2014, the books had made money on 21 of the previous 23 Super Bowls, with an average win of $5.5 million over the previous ten years. The most profitable Super Bowl was in 2005, when the Philadelphia Eagles covered the spread against the favored New England Patriots, earning the books $15.4 million. The two losses were in 1995—when the San Francisco 49ers defeated the San Diego Chargers—and 2008—when the favored Patriots lost to the New York Giants, costing the books $2.5 million.

== Delaware ==
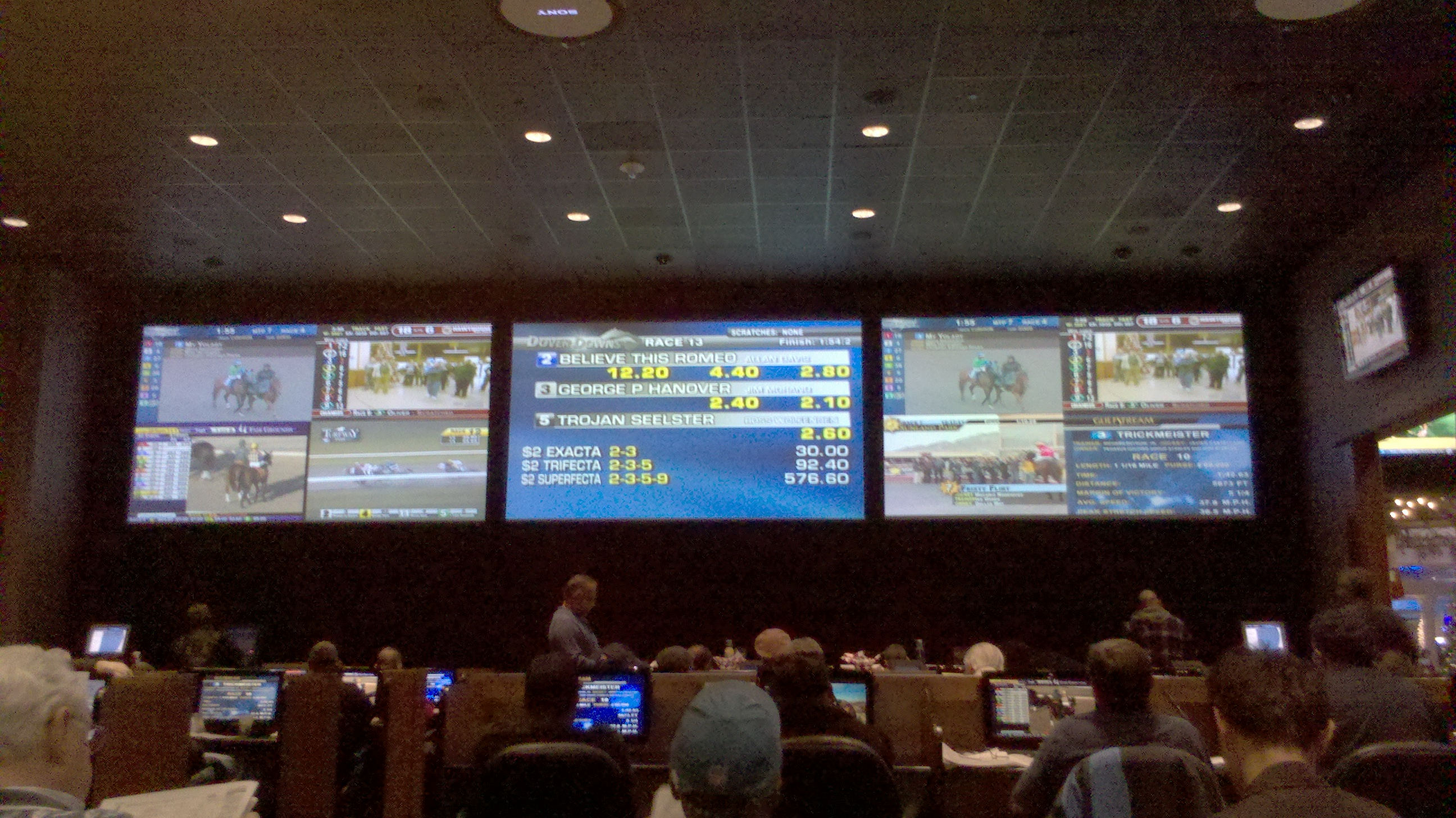
The sports book at Bally's Dover, December 2011.

In 2009, a bill passed to allow betting on almost every sport. That year, the NFL, MLB, NHL, NBA, and NCAA filed a lawsuit against the state of Delaware, claiming their sports books were violating federal law. The US Supreme Court ruled that the law partially violated the federal law, and Delaware was only allowed to offer parlays on NFL games. Delaware's three racetrack casinos—Bally's Dover, Harrington Raceway & Casino, and Delaware Park Racetrack—have sports books. Each sportsbook has multiple televisions, large tote boards and stations for people to wager. During the 2011 NFL season, the three sports books generated $4.4 million in revenue for the state. On June 5, 2018, the casino sportsbooks in Delaware expanded sports betting to single-game and championship wagers on professional and college sports (excluding Delaware college teams) including football, baseball, basketball, hockey, soccer, boxing/MMA, golf, and auto racing.

== See also ==
- Betting exchange
- Betting shop
- Bookmaker
- Point shaving
- Sports betting
- Spread betting
