= Greyhound racing in the United States =

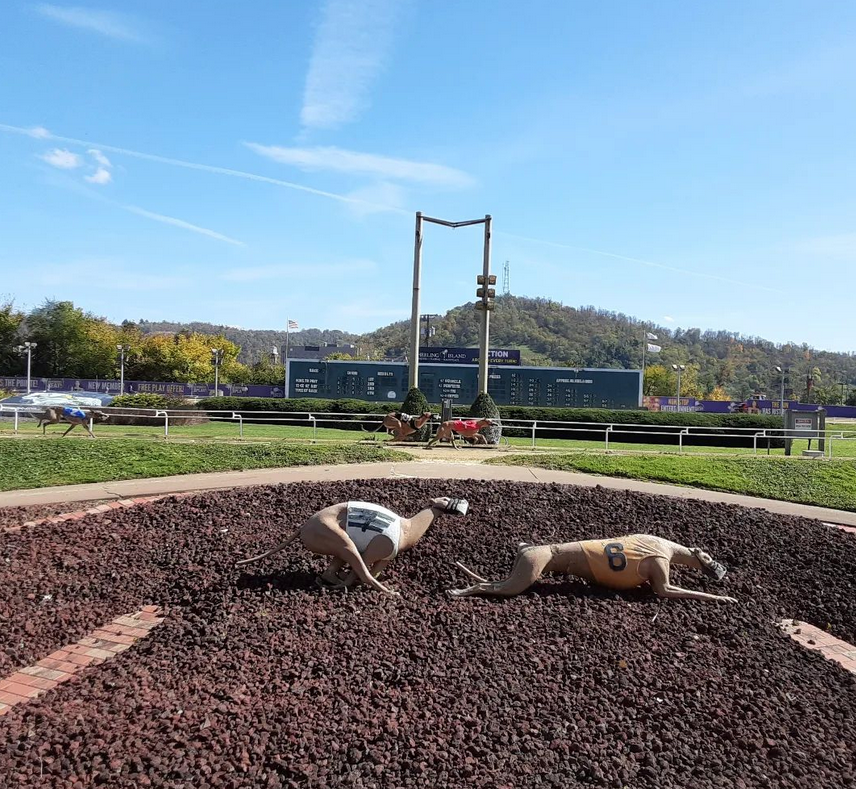
- Greyhounds racing at Wheeling Island Hotel-Casino-Racetrack in October 2022, one of the last two active greyhound tracks in the United States.
- Start date: May 29, 1920, at Blue Star Amusement Park, Emeryville

Greyhound racing in the United States is a sport and parimutuel gambling activity. The industry is regulated by state law and greyhound care is regulated by the American Greyhound Council (AGC) and the National Greyhound Association.

Beginning in roughly 1990, and continuing over the next three decades, the vast majority of greyhound tracks have closed due to declining betting revenue, encroachment by Native American gaming and commercial casino gambling into states with greyhound racing, the legalization of sports betting and concerns over the welfare of racing greyhounds. Although roughly one-half of US states offer online advance-deposit wagering as well as off-track betting and race and sports book betting, as of 2026, only two tracks currently conduct actual live racing onsite, both in West Virginia.

== History ==
The first greyhound in the United States was registered in 1894.

Owen Patrick Smith began to work on a design for a mechanical lure in the early 1900s, and finally, after a number of failures had success in California.

In February 1920, Smith, along with Tom Keen and George Sawyer, tore down the Emeryville, California arena to make way for the construction of a modern racetrack using this mechanical lure, described in the press as the "automatic rabbit" This new track held its first races on Saturday, May 29, 1920.

In Florida, the amount gambled at dog tracks declined by 72% between 1990 and 2013. According to a study commissioned by the legislature, the state lost between $1 million and $3.3 million on greyhound racing in 2012. In November 2018, Florida voters passed a constitutional referendum banning greyhound racing at tracks after December 31, 2020. Some Florida tracks closed earlier in 2020 due to the COVID-19 pandemic and never reopened before the December deadline.

=== Active tracks in West Virginia ===
As of 2026, there are only two active greyhound racetracks in the United States, both located in the state of West Virginia and owned by hospitality conglomerate Delaware North. Wheeling Island Hotel-Casino-Racetrack has operated greyhound races in Wheeling since 1976, while Mardi Gras Casino and Resort, formerly known as Tri-State Greyhound Park, has operated in Cross Lanes since 1985. Attendance has been down more than 50 percent in recent years, but handle is still approximately $1 million for each day of racing.

Delaware North has noted that they make very little profit on live greyhound racing, but turn a modest profit on simulcasting. In November 2022, a spokesperson for Delaware North noted that the company "would support legislation to run its casinos without greyhound racing", and that year's change in the makeup of the West Virginia Legislature could see support for it dwindle.

Attempts have been made to ban greyhound racing by the West Virginia House of Delegates in 2017 and 2020, but these efforts were stifled by Governor and West Virginia Senate, respectively.

In 2021, Bill 3093 was introduced to the West Virginia House of Delegates to decouple dog racing licenses from racetrack casinos, "ending the state mandate for unprofitable greyhound racing." If passed, the bill, with the West Virginia House Judiciary committee since March 2021, would further weaken the economic viability of greyhound racing in the state.

In 2023, H.R. 3894 was introduced during the 118th Congress to ban greyhound racing at the federal level. This bill was referred to the Subcommittee on Livestock, Dairy, and Poultry of the House Committee on Agriculture.

As of 2025, roughly 1,000 greyhounds are bred each year in West Virginia for racing. Greyhounds begin their training when they reach their first birthday.

=== Legality in other states ===
In addition to West Virginia, live greyhound racing is still legal, though not currently practiced, in the states of Alabama, Texas, Kansas, Iowa, and Wisconsin.

=== Simulcasting ===
Simulcast, off-track betting, race and sports book betting, and/or online advance-deposit wagering of live greyhound racing from Australia, Ireland, New Zealand, the United Kingdom, and West Virginia, remains legal in the following states: Alabama, Connecticut, Florida, Idaho, Iowa, Louisiana, Montana, Nevada, New Mexico, North Dakota, Oregon, Rhode Island, South Dakota, Texas, West Virginia, Wisconsin and Wyoming.

Three states are planning to prohibit simulcast betting: New Hampshire in 2027, Arkansas in 2028, and Arizona in 2029.

== Records ==
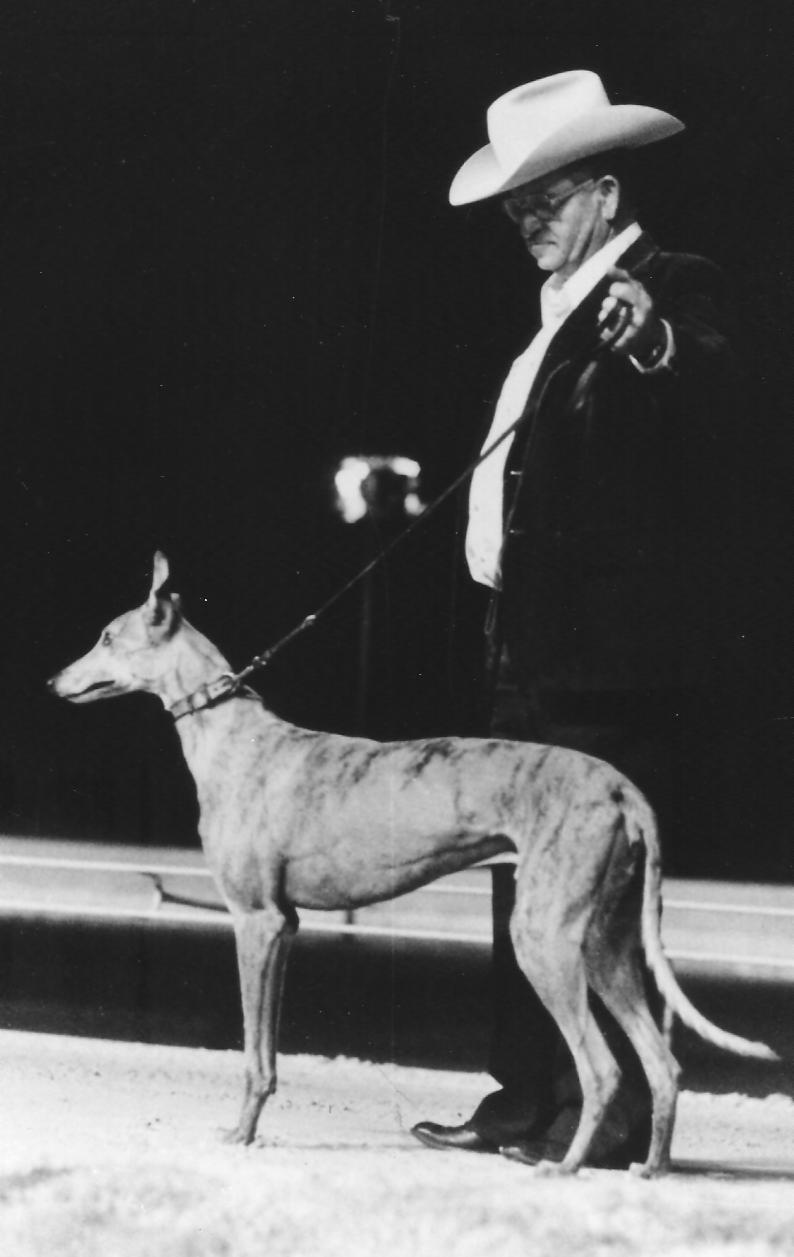
Joe Dump with trainer J. C. Stanley in 1979, who was then world record holder in terms of consecutive races won.

In 1951, a greyhound named Real Huntsman won 27 races in a row in Florida.

In 1978 and 1979, a greyhound named Joe Dump set a world record of 31 consecutive wins. The red brindle dog was trained by J.C. Stanley and owned by Joe Fallon and raced primarily at Greenetrack in Alabama.

On June 4, 1994, a greyhound bitch called Pat C Rendezvous won her 33rd consecutive race to break Ballyregan Bob's world record and went on to win 36 consecutive races.

In 1995, a greyhound called JJ Doc Richards won his 37th consecutive greyhound race to beat Pat C Rendezvous' record.

In 1998, a greyhound called Leos Midas won for the 103rd time to equal the United States record number of total races won, the race was at Orange Park.

== Closed tracks by state ==
=== Alabama ===
- Birmingham Race Course in Birmingham (1987–2020)
- Greenetrack, Eutaw (1977–1997)
- Mobile Greyhound Park, Theodore (1973–2017)
- Victoryland, Shorter (1984–2011)

=== Arizona ===
- Amado Greyhound Park, Amado (1963–1983)
- Apache Greyhound Park, Apache Junction (1959–2004)
- Black Canyon Greyhound Park, Black Canyon City (1965–1982)
- Phoenix Greyhound Park, Phoenix (1954–2009)
- Tucson Greyhound Park, South Tucson (1944–2016)
- Yuma Greyhound Park, Yuma (1965–1993)

=== Arkansas ===
- Southland Park Gaming and Racing, West Memphis (1956–2022)

=== California ===
- Baden Kennel Club, San Francisco (1933–1937)
- Blue Star Amusement Park, Emeryville (1920)
- El Cerrito Kennel Club, El Cerrito (1932 - 1939)

=== Colorado ===
- Clover Leaf, Loveland (1955–2006)
- Interstate, Byers (1971–2006)
- Mile High, Commerce City (1949–2008)
- Pueblo Greyhound Park, Pueblo (1949–1999)
- Rocky Mountain Greyhound Park, Colorado Springs (1948–2005)

=== Connecticut ===
- Plainfield Greyhound Park, Plainfield (1976–2005)
- Shoreline Star Greyhound Park, Bridgeport (1995–2006)

=== Florida ===
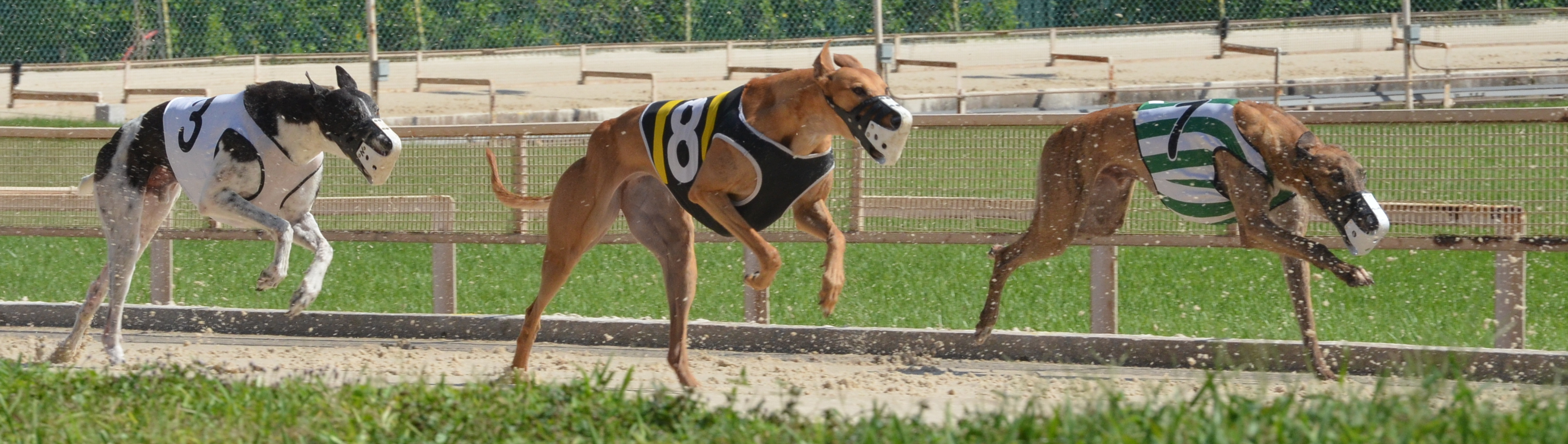
- A race taking place at Derby Lane in Florida, which closed in 2020.
  Biscayne Greyhound Track, Miami Shores (1926–1995)
- Daytona Beach Racing and Card Club, Daytona Beach (1948–2020)
- Derby Lane Greyhound Track, St. Petersburg (1925–2020)
- Ebro Greyhound Track, Ebro (1955–2019)
- Flagler Greyhound Track, Miami (1932–2018)
- Hialeah Park Race Track, Miami (1922–2001?)
- Hollywood Greyhound Track, Hallandale Beach (1934–2020)
- Jacksonville Greyhound Track, Jacksonville (1934–2007)
- Jefferson County Kennel Club, Monticello (1959–2011)
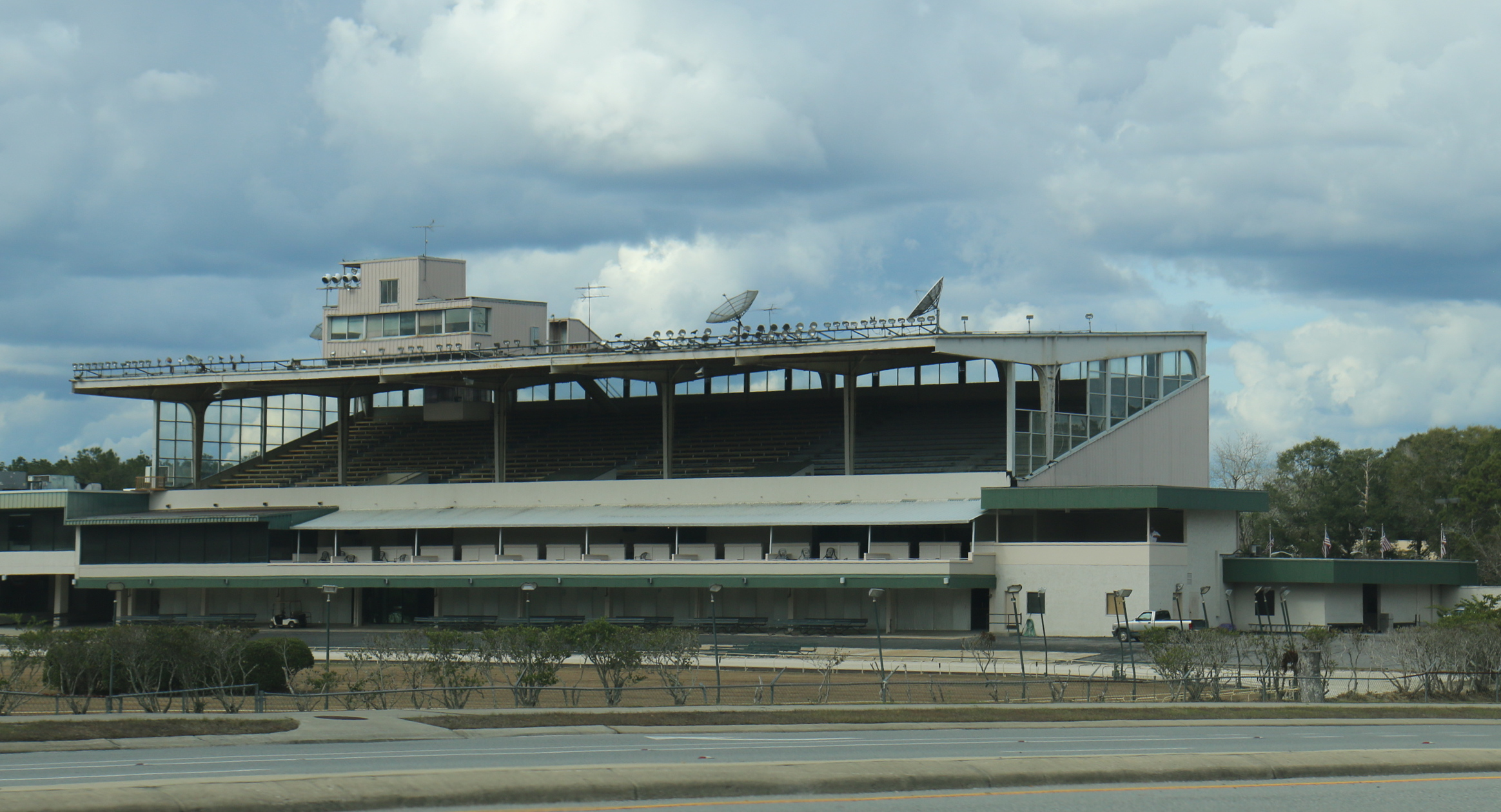
- Ebro Greyhound Park in 2017
  Key West Greyhound Track, Key West (1953–1991)
- Miami Beach Kennel Club, Miami Beach (1928–1980)
- Melbourne Greyhound Park, Melbourne (1990–2020)
- Naples-Fort Myers Track and Entertainment Center, Bonita Springs (1957–2020)
- Orange Park Kennel Club, Orange Park (1946–2020)
- Palm Beach Kennel Club, West Palm Beach (1932–2020)
- Pensacola Greyhound Track, Pensacola (1946–2019)
- St. Johns Bayard Greyhound Track, Jacksonville (1977–2000)
- Sanford-Orlando Kennel Club, Longwood (1935–2020)
- Sarasota Kennel Club, Sarasota (1944–2020)
- Seminole Greyhound Park, Casselberry (1981–2000)
- Tampa Greyhound Track, Tampa (1933–2015)

=== Idaho ===
- Coeur d’Alene Greyhound Park, Post Falls (1988–1995)

=== Illinois ===
- Grove Park Greyhound Track, Glenview (1926–1934)

=== Iowa ===
- Bluffs Run, Council Bluffs (1986–2015)
- Dubuque Greyhound Park / Q Casino, Dubuque (1985–2022)
- Waterloo Greyhound Park, Waterloo (1986–1996)

=== Kansas ===
- Camptown Greyhound Park, Frontenac (1995–1996)
- The Woodlands, Kansas City (1989–2008)
- Wichita Greyhound Park, Wichita (1989–2007)

=== Massachusetts ===
- Raynham Greyhound Park, Raynham (1940–2009)
- Wonderland Greyhound Park, Revere (1935–2010)

=== Montana ===
- Great Falls Dog Track, Great Falls (1950s)

=== Nevada ===
- Las Vegas Downs, Henderson (1981–1983)

=== New Hampshire ===
- Belmont Lakes Region Greyhound Track, Belmont (1975–2005)
- Hinsdale Greyhound Park, Hinsdale (1973–2008)
- Seabrook Greyhound Park, Seabrook (1973–2010)

=== New Jersey ===
- Union Kennel Club, Linden (1930s)

=== New York ===
- Nassau Kennel Club, Mineola, Long Island (1930s)

=== Oregon ===
- Multnomah Greyhound Park, Fairview (1933–2004)

=== Rhode Island ===
- Twin River Casino / Lincoln Greyhound Park, Lincoln (1977–2009)

=== South Dakota ===
- Black Hills, Rapid City (1949–1994)
- Sodrac Park, Sioux City (1955–1995)

=== Texas ===
- Valley Race Park, Harlingen (1990–2017)
- Gulf Greyhound Park, La Marque (1992–2020)
- Gulf Coast Racing, Corpus Christi (1990–2020)

=== Vermont ===
- Green Mountain Race Track, Pownal (1976–1991)

=== Wisconsin ===
- Dairyland Greyhound Park, Kenosha (1990–2019)
- Fox Valley Greyhound Park, Kaukauna (1990–1995)
- Geneva Lakes Kennel Club, Delavan (1990–2005)
- St Croix Meadows Greyhound Race Park, Hudson (1991–2001)
- Wisconsin Dells, Lake Delton (1990–1996)
