= Glossary of North American horse racing =

The following is a glossary of North American horse racing.

Additional glossaries at:

- Glossary of Australian and New Zealand punting
- Glossary of equestrian terms
- Parimutuel betting#Parimutuel bet types

== A ==
Advance-deposit wagering
Advance-deposit wagering (ADW) is a form of horse race gambling in which the bettor must fund their account before being allowed to place bets. ADW is often conducted online or by phone.
Allowance race
A race for which entries are restricted to horses meeting certain earnings or other race criteria. The track operator's designated official (usually the Racing Secretary) establishes specific conditions that determine what weights are to be carried by any competing horse based on factors from the horse's previous performances including races won and/or earnings.
Allowances
Adjustments in weight "allowed" in a race. Examples include those granted because an apprentice is riding, for three-year-olds running against older horses, or for female horses running against male horses.
Allowance optional claiming
See Optional claiming
Also eligible
A horse officially entered in a race, but because the field is too large, the horse is not allowed to start unless other horses are scratched prior to a set deadline.
Apprentice
A young jockey, sometimes called a "bug," who is still in training. An apprentice is required to ride a given number of winners in a specified period of time before completing their apprenticeship.

== B ==
Backside
Also sometimes called the backstretch (see "backstretch", below), an area with restricted access, usually behind the track, where the stables and residential living areas for staff are located.
Backstretch
The straightway on the farther side of an elliptical or oval racecourse. It typically runs parallel to the grandstand and the homestretch where the finish line is located. Also refers to the stabling area adjacent to the racetrack (see "backside", above).
Bearing In (or out)
When a horse does not run straight on the course. There are many causes, including fatigue, infirmity, reaction to being whipped, or the rider's inability to control the horse.
Black type
In a sales catalogue, black type is boldface print and indicates a stakes winner if the name is in all caps, or a stakes-placed runner if in upper and lower mixed case letters.
Blanket finish
A finish "so close that a blanket would cover all the contestants involved."
Bleeder, bled
A horse that bleeds from the nostrils either during the running of a race, or when returning to be unsaddled. May be due to Exercise-induced pulmonary hemorrhage (EIPH). May explain a poor effort. See also: Furosemide (Lasix).
Blinkers
A hood designed with partial cups behind the horse's eyes that limit a horse's rear and side vision to varying degrees, depending on design. Blinkers may prevent a horse from swerving away from objects or other horses.
Bloodstock agent
People who specialize in buying and selling horses on behalf of clients and offer advice on purchasing horses.See also: Pinhooking
Blue hen
A mare who produces many high quality offspring who also have a significant impact on the breed.
Book
1) The list of mares that a stallion will breed in a given breeding season. A full book is when the maximum number of mares the stallion is deemed able to breed has been reached. 2) A jockey's riding commitments for races. An agent usually is the person who manages and books the races a jockey is to ride.
Bounce
A horse that runs a poor race directly following a career-best or near-best performance.
Boxed in
A horse that is surrounded on all sides by either other horses or the track's rail, and cannot move to a more favorable position.
Break or broke
To leave the starting gate in the initial strides of a race.
Break maiden
When a horse wins a race for the first time in its career.
Breather
Deliberately restraining or easing off a horse for a short distance, allowing the horse to conserve or renew the horse's stamina or strength.
Breeze
1. To win easily. 2. A timed workout where the horse is not being asked for full speed; less effort than handily; or can refer to a light training workout over a short distance that is used to gauge a horse's racing potential and performance.
Broke down
A horse that has a serious physical problem during a race, usually limping or unable to put a limb on the ground, resulting in either being removed from the track in a horse ambulance or, in the worst cases, euthanized.
Bullet or bullet work
The best workout time at a track on a given day at a specific distance. The past performance listings indicate this work by a printer's "bullet" in front of that particular workout time.
Butazolidin or bute
See Phenylbutazone, below.

== C ==
Chalk
The horse who runs a particular race at the best win odds; the favorite. A bettor who routinely places wagers on favorites is called a "Chalk Player." The horse with the second—-lowest win odds is sometimes called "Second Chalk" and so on. If all the races run so far have been won by horses with relatively low win odds, then today's results so far are called "Chalky."
Champion
Formally, and especially when capitalized, a Champion is a racehorse who has won an Eclipse Award in America, or an equivalent award in other racing jurisdictions. Informally, the term may be used for the winner of a major race.
Chart
A detailed list of statistics about a race. The chart lists the position of each horse at various points of the race, the margin between horses, plus the odds for the race, and each horse's sex, age, weight carried, owner, and trainer. The chart also describes the purse, race conditions, payouts for various winning bets, times and other data.
Chute
An extension to a straightaway on either the homestretch or the backstretch used for establishing a distance to eliminate the need to begin the race on a turn.
Circle the field
When a horse is forced to go very wide around other horses in order to move into a winning position.
Claiming race
Race in which any competing horse is subject to be purchased for a preset price. A claim is made before the race and can only be acted upon by a licensed owner or their agent. The price is set by the conditions of the race. If the horse wins prize money during the race, the money goes to the previous owner. Prior to 1925 they were called Selling races.
Closer
A horse that performs best during the final part of the race, usually coming from behind against most of its race competitors.
Clubhouse turn
The turn to the right of the grandstand, so called because the clubhouse is usually to the right of the general stands
Conditions
Conditions are requirements for horses to be entered into a specific race, such as age, sex, number of wins, and amount of money won. Racetracks publish a Conditions Book listing the upcoming stakes that set the eligibility requirements and any restrictions for each race.
Connections
The owner and trainer of a horse. The term can also be extended to other members of a racing team or partnership.
Coupled
The trainer or owner is entering more than one horse in a race with the purpose of having one betting entry to protect those betting on the other horse

== D ==
Dead heat
Term to denote a tie at the finish of the race between two or more horses. A tie with three horses is very rare.
Derby
A stakes race for three-year-old racehorses. In 2016, there were over 20 derbies in the United States, often named for the racetrack or the state in which the race is run.
Did not finish (DNF)
A horse that did not finish the race, for any of a number of reasons
Distance
A recorded margin of difference between the winning horse and a competitor so great that the actual length wasn't measured.

== E ==
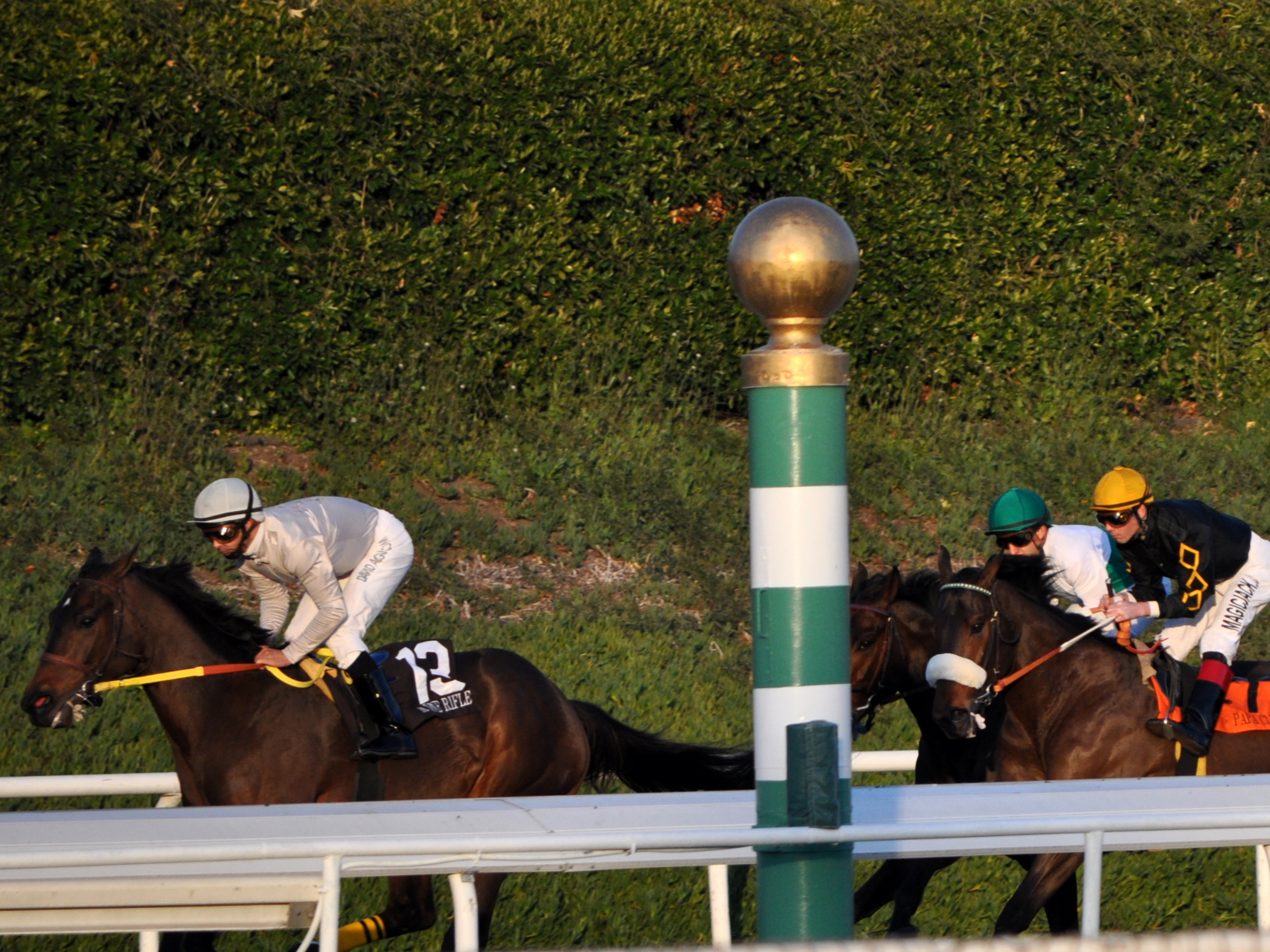
Horses going past the eighth pole at Santa Anita Park

Eased
Another term for Pulled Up. When a jockey deliberately slows down a horse during a race, often to prevent injury or harm to the horse.
Eighth pole
A pole to signal that the finish line is one-eighth of a mile away. Eighth poles are green and white striped
Entry
See Coupling, above.

== F ==
Far turn
The turn off the backstretch into the homestretch. So called because it is farthest from the finish line.
Fast pace
When the leading horses in a race set fractional times that are substantially faster than normal for the distance.
Frontrunner, pacesetter
A horse that has a preferred running style to run at or near the front of the field; such horses generally lead or try to lead. Compare: stalker, closer. See also: Pacemaker, rabbit
Furlong
A distance equal to 220 yards (1/8 mile or 200 m)
Furosemide
Generic name of a medication used to treat exercise-induced pulmonary hemorrhage (EIPH). Most common trade name is Lasix. (see bleeder). Indicated on past performance tables by the letter L.
Futurity
A race for two-year-old horses for which they have been nominated for entry while still a foal; the owners make payments over time to maintain the horse's eligibility. Purses are usually large

== G ==
Graded stakes race
A classification system begun in 1973 to rank stakes races in North America, similar to the Group races of Europe. Roman numerals (I, II, or III) are used to designate the race classification.

== H ==
Half-brother, half-sister
Horses who are out of the same dam, but sired by different stallions. Only horses with the same dam are considered half-siblings.
Handicap
1. A race designed to create equality by the horses being assigned different, specific weights determined by the track handicapper based on an assessment of each entrant's potential. 2. The process of selecting winners based on past performances. 3. The amount of weight, sometimes called an impost, carried by the horse.
Handily
Working or racing with moderate effort, more than a breeze.
Hand ride
When the jockey urges a horse just with their hands and does not use the whip.
Handle
The amount wagered in the various pari-mutuel pools for either a specified race, program (ie, all races at a given track on a given day), meeting or year.
Head of the stretch, top of the stretch
The beginning of the homestretch.
Hit the board
To finish in the top four placings, literally, to appear on the tote board.
Homestretch or stretch
The final straight section of the track leading to the finish line.

== I ==
In the money
1. For a horse to finish in the top three placings, where bettors win money. 2. Less often, for the horse to finish in the top four, where the horses win prize money.
Inquiry
1) When track stewards review the race to determine if there was an infraction of the rules. 2) When the "inquiry" sign is placed on the tote board. Inquiries lodged by a jockey are called objections.

== J ==
Juvenile
Two-year-old horses. Also refers to certain races for two-year-olds.

== L ==
Lasix
See Furosemide, above.
Length
Used to describe the distance between horses during a race and at the finish line. One length is approximately 8 feet or 2.4 m and represents the length of one horse.

== M ==
Maiden race
Specific race for horses that have never won a race, usually by age, but not always.
Margin
The distance between horses at a given point in the race, usually measured in lengths (see above). For the leader, it is the distance ahead of the second place horse. For other horses, it is the distance by which they trailed the leader. Shown in past performance charts as the small number after the horse's position at a given call.
Minus pool
When there is not enough money left in the parimutuel pool to pay the legally required minimum on each winning bet. This usually happens when one horse is very heavily bet upon. In these cases, the racing association usually is the entity that makes up the difference.
Morning line
The approximate odds before wagering begins and exact odds are established.
Mudder
A racehorse that runs well on a muddy racetrack.

== N ==
Never fired
A horse that loses a race after running the entire distance in virtually the same position without igniting a sudden burst of energy to challenge other horses in front.
New shooter
A horse which skipped the Kentucky Derby to run in the Preakness Stakes or Belmont Stakes.
Nom de course
A name, usually a pseudonym, used by a racehorse owner under which their horse is registered to compete.
Nose
The shortest margin of victory in a race, any length shorter than a horse's nose.

== O ==
Oaks
A stakes race for three-year-old fillies.
Odds-on
Odds of less than even money ($1 to $1). A winning bet returns the amount wagered plus the ratio specified by the odds. A winner at a payoff of under $4.00 for a $2 bet is "odds on."
Optional claiming
A race where a horse can either meet the conditions of the race or be entered as a claimer.
Out of the money
For a horse to finish worse than third, meaning that bettors do not win money. Opposite of "in the money".

== P ==
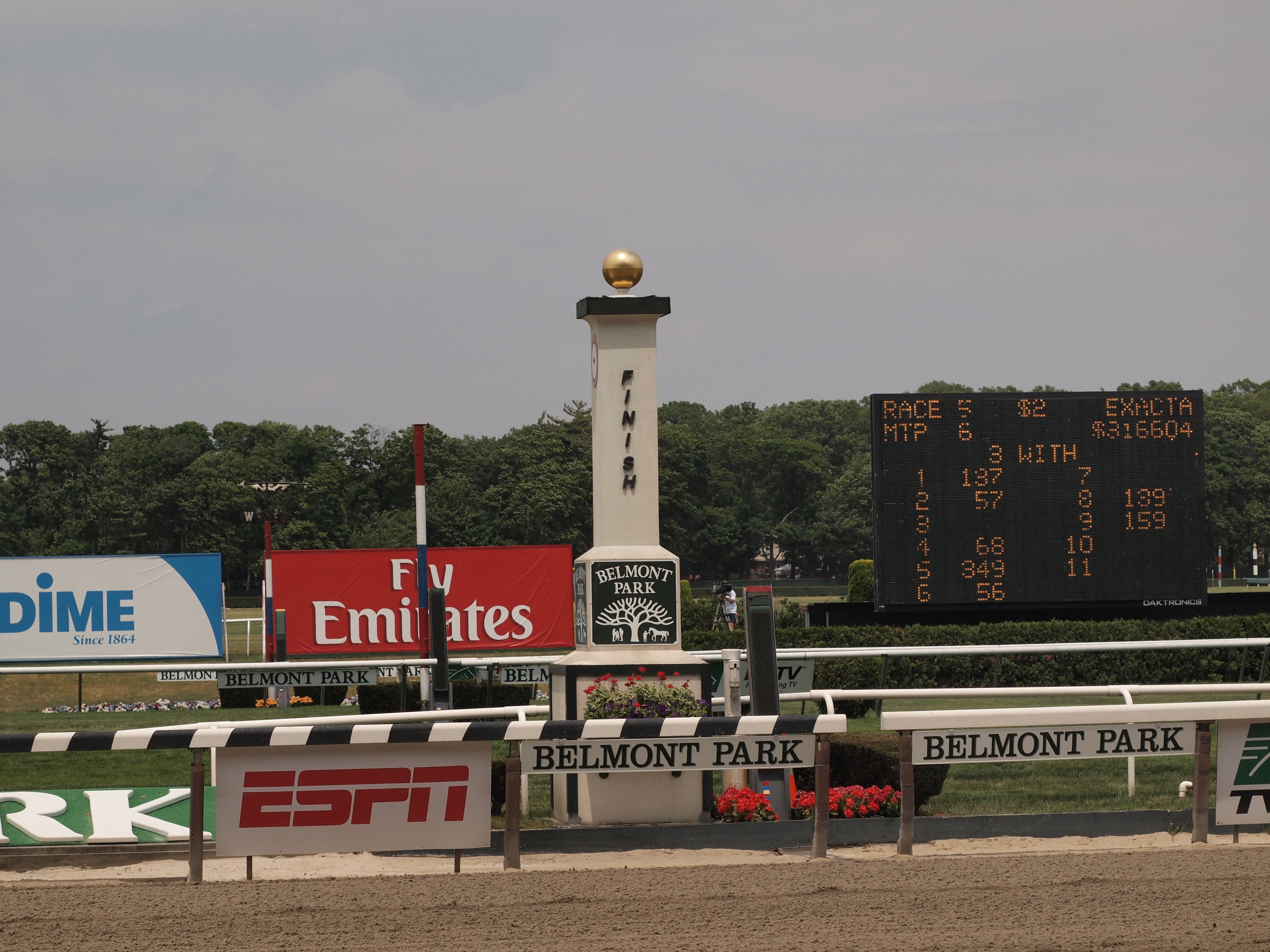
The finish post at Belmont Park

Pace
The speed of a race. To run a horse "off the pace" means that the horse will not be in the lead for the early part of the race but will advance to the front shortly before the finish of the race.
Pacemaker, Rabbit
A horse with early speed sent to the front early in a race to set a fast pace, often to tire out other horses and help a stablemate who runs off the pace win by closing at the end. In contrast, a frontrunner is trying to win the race. Compare: closer, stalker.
Pacesetter
see frontrunner
Paddock
Saddling and parading area where horses can be seen prior to the race. See also: paddock for agricultural uses.
Past performances
A list of the horses in a race showing each horse's previous racing record, earnings, pedigree and so on.
Phenylbutazone
Generic term for a widely used analgesic medication in horses. Most common trade name is Butazolidin; often called "bute". Shown on past performance tables as a B.
Photo finish
A race result so close that the judges cannot decide the order of finish until they consult photographs taken of the race finish.
Pinhook, pinhooking
Buying young race horses, usually yearlings, with an intent to resell later at a profit.See also: Bloodstock agent
Place
To finish second. Broadly speaking, to finish in the top three (see also In the money).
Place bet
A wager on a horse to finish first or second.
Pole
Markers placed at specific locations around the track marking the distance from the finish line, named after the distance remaining, not the distance run, i.e. the quarter pole, eighth pole, sixteenth pole each measure the distance left in the race. One-sixteenth poles are black and white striped. Eighth poles are green and white. Quarter poles are red and white.
Post
1. The starting point of a race 2. Post position (see below) 3. (verb) To reference or record a win.
Post parade
When the horses in a race travel from the paddock to the starting gate ("post"), past the grandstands.
Post position
The number of the individual stalls in the starting gate where horses will begin a race. The first stall (#1 or inside position) is next to the rail at most racetracks with higher numbers on the outside of the track. Post position can be a hindrance or tactical advantage for horses depending on their racing style.
Post time
The specified time of day a horse race will start.
Prep
A workout or race that is used to prepare for a future engagement.
Pull up
To pull back on the reins to slowly stop a horse. Jockeys will typically ease a horse to a stop after passing the finish line or if there is a problem with the horse, such as injury, that necessitates a withdrawal from a race.

== Q ==
Quarter pole
A pole to signal that the finish line is one-quarter of a mile away. Quarter poles are red and white striped.

== R ==
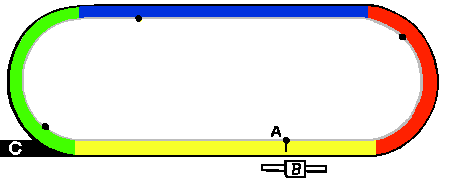
Generic left-handed racetrack diagram: A = finish line, B = grandstand, C/black = chute, Yellow = homestretch, Red = Clubhouse turn, Blue = backstretch, Green = Far turn, gray inside line = rail and the white center is the infield. Black dots note standard locations of the poles that measure distance to the finish.

Rabbit
See Pacemaker
Racecard
A program for a race day that lists the individual races and the name, age, and sex of each horse scheduled to compete along with their recent performances plus the name of their jockey, trainer and owner.
Racemare
Female horse (mare) who has competed in sanctioned Thoroughbred races.
Race meet
When a racetrack is scheduled over a designated number of specific days to run horse races.
Racetrack or racecourse
A flat surface made of dirt, grass (turf) or synthetic material, usually arranged in an oval, where races are conducted. Races can either be run in a counterclockwise (left-handed) or clockwise (right-handed) direction around the track. Left-handed, dirt tracks are the predominant form in the United States, mostly due to tradition. Tracks typically consist of two turns, a backstretch, a straight (or homestretch) arranged around a central infield and various surrounding structures such as the finish line and stands for spectators.
Rail
Inside fence on a racetrack. Less often, both the inside and outside fences bordering the racetrack.
Rank
A horse that is fractious and hard for the jockey to handle.
Rank outsider
A horse that is not expected to win a race.
Rate
A deliberate action by the jockey to keep a horse "off the pace".
Ridden out
When a horse is not whipped but rather works out or wins with a strong hand ride.

== S ==
Scratch
To remove a horse from a race before it is run.
Sealed track
Packing down a track surface when it rains so that the water drains off the surface.
Show
To finish in third position. Betting on a horse to show pays out if the horse finishes third or better.
Silks/colors, colours
The silk or nylon jacket and cap worn by a jockey to indicate the owner of the horse, so people watching the race can distinguish each horse. Each owner's unique colors are registered with the national and/or regional racing authority. The first use of registered "colours" occurred in 1762 at Newmarket Racecourse in England
Stakes race
A race where a fee must be paid to enter, which may include a fee for nominating, paying additional fees to maintain eligibility, then fees for entry and starting. The track often adds additional money to the total purse.See also: Graded stakes race
Stalker
A horse whose running style is to stay just behind the leaders. Compare: Closer, front-runner, pacesetter.
Stayer
A horse that can run long distances. In North America, this refers to distances of 12 furlongs or longer. Horses who finish strongly in races at 10 furlongs may also be considered stayers.
Steward or track steward
Racetrack official responsible for enforcement of racing regulations.
Stretch
see homestretch, above.
Stud mare
A female horse kept for breeding purposes. see also: Horse breeding

== T ==
Top of the stretch
See Head of the stretch
Track record/course record
The fastest time on a specific racetrack it has taken any Thoroughbred to complete a set race distance on a specific surface. Many tracks have more than one surface (typically dirt and turf), so there are separate track records maintained for each course, also known as a course record.

== U ==
Undercard
The races on the same day that precede a major or important race.

== W ==
Walkover
Race with only one horse going to the post. As a result, the sole starter needs only to gallop the distance of the race to be the official winner, but covering the distance is required by racing rules.
Washy, Washed out
A horse that is sweating profusely due to nerves.
Weight for Age
Race with a fixed amount of weight carried by horses based on their age, sex or other parameters such as time of year or distance of race.
Winner's circle
The area next to a racetrack, usually near the grandstands and enclosed, where the winning horse and jockey are brought for photographs and awards.
Wire to wire
When a horse leads the race from start to finish.

== Bibliography ==
- Price, Stephen D. (2003). The Horseman's Illustrated Dictionary: Full Explanations of More Than 1,000 Terms and Phrases Used by Horsemen Past and Present. Guilford, CT: Globe Pequot. ISBN 1592280986.
- Price, Steven D.; Shiers, Jessie (2007). The Lyons Press Horseman's Dictionary (Revised ed.). Guilford, CT: Lyons Press. ISBN 978-1-59921-036-0.
