= List of casinos in West Virginia =

This is a list of casinos in West Virginia.

West Virginia became the fifth US state to legalize online gambling when HB 2934 passed the State House in February 2019. The first legal online casinos launched in the state in July 2020. With a total of 5 land-based casinos in West Virginia (see table below), the new gambling regulation allows for each land-based casino to apply for a single online casino license, which permits them to have up to 3 casinos skins. This means there will be a total of 15 online casinos in the state of West Virginia.

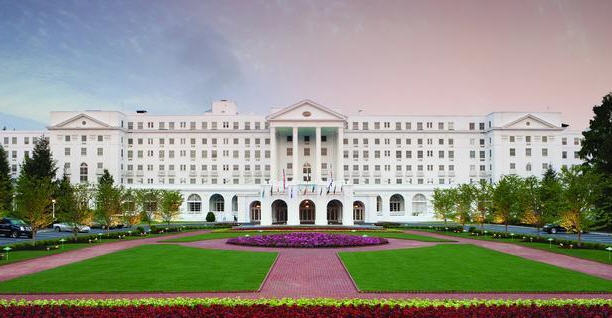
Greenbrier

== List of casinos ==
List of casinos in the U.S. state of West Virginia
| Casino | City | County | State | District | Type | Comments |
|---|---|---|---|---|---|---|
| The Casino Club at the Greenbrier | White Sulphur Springs | Greenbrier | West Virginia | | Land-based | Limited to the hotel guests |
| Hollywood Casino at Charles Town Races | Charles Town | Jefferson | West Virginia | | Racino |
| Mardi Gras Casino and Resort | Nitro | Kanawha | West Virginia | | Racino |
| Mountaineer Casino, Racetrack and Resort | Chester | Hancock | West Virginia | | Racino |
| Wheeling Island Hotel-Casino-Racetrack | Wheeling | Ohio | West Virginia | | Racino |

== Gallery ==
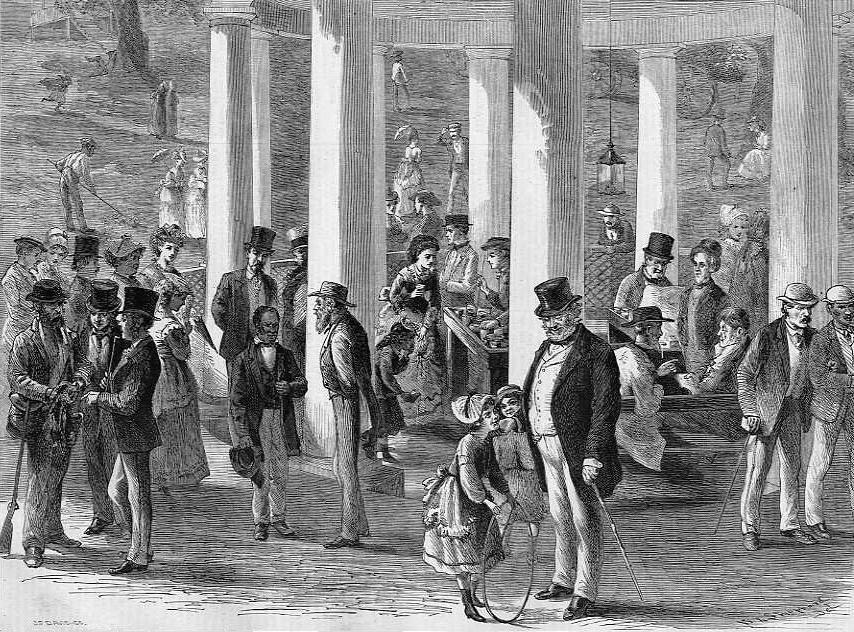
Greenbrier

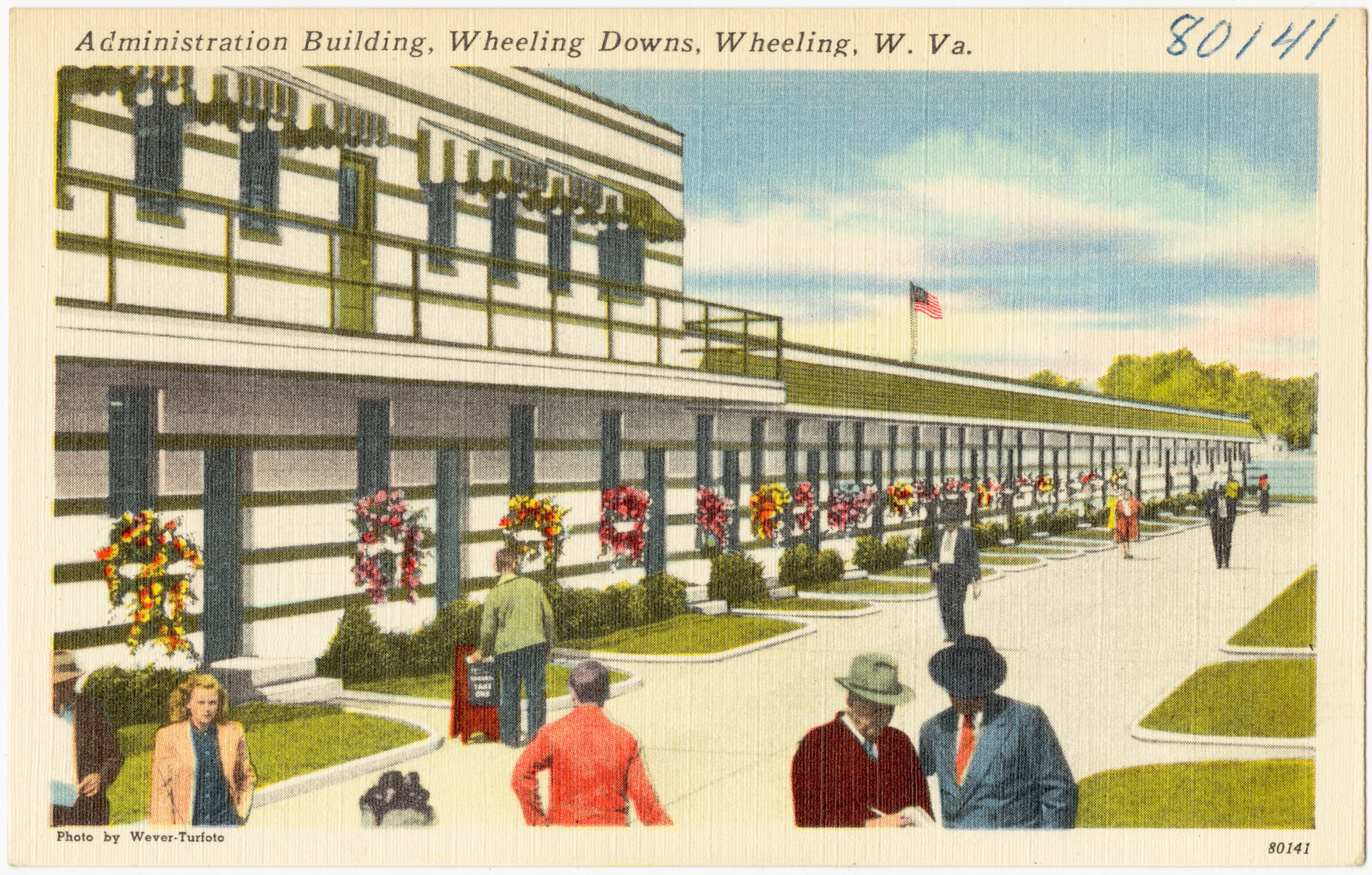
Wheeling Downs

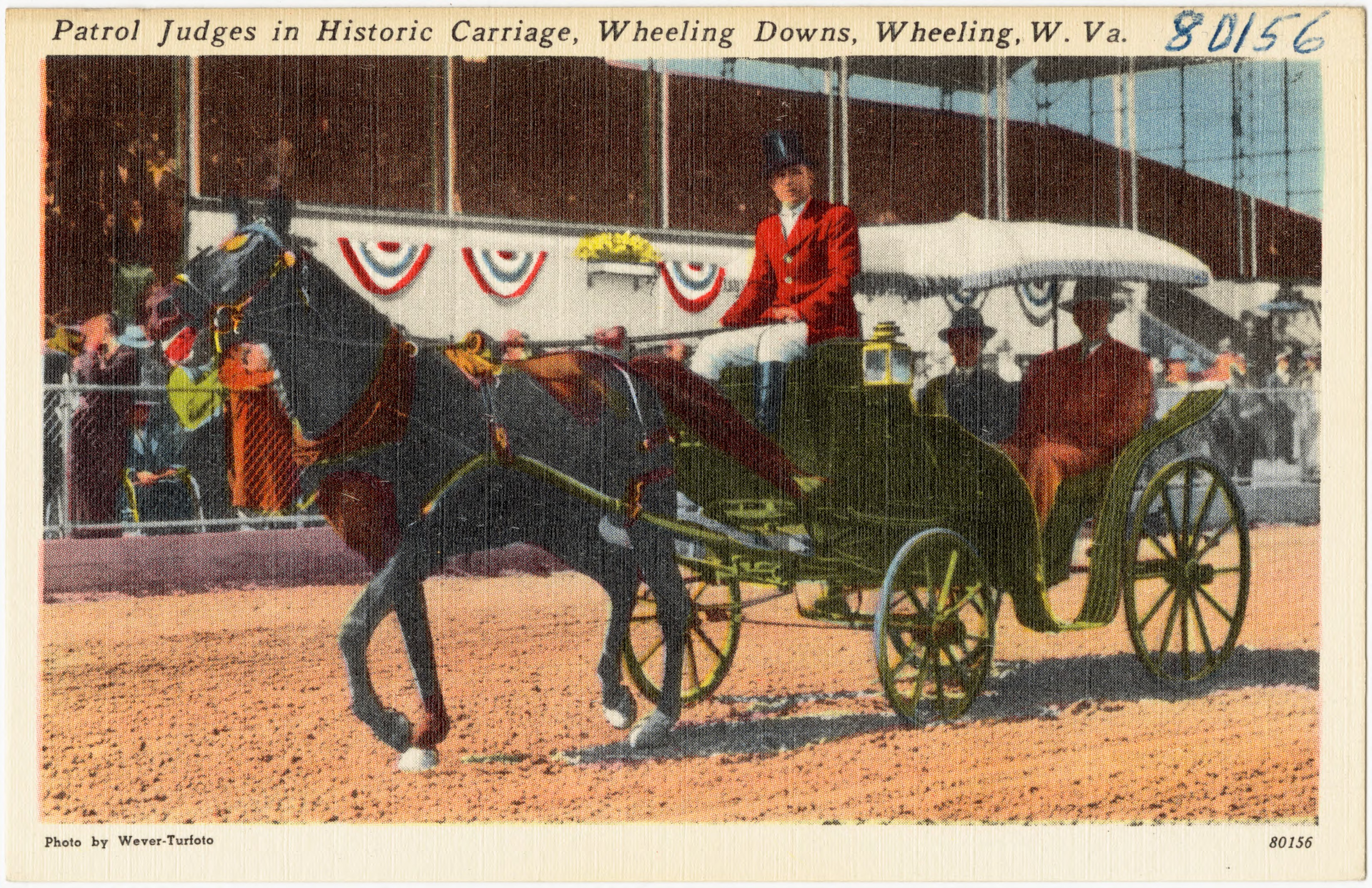
Wheeling Downs

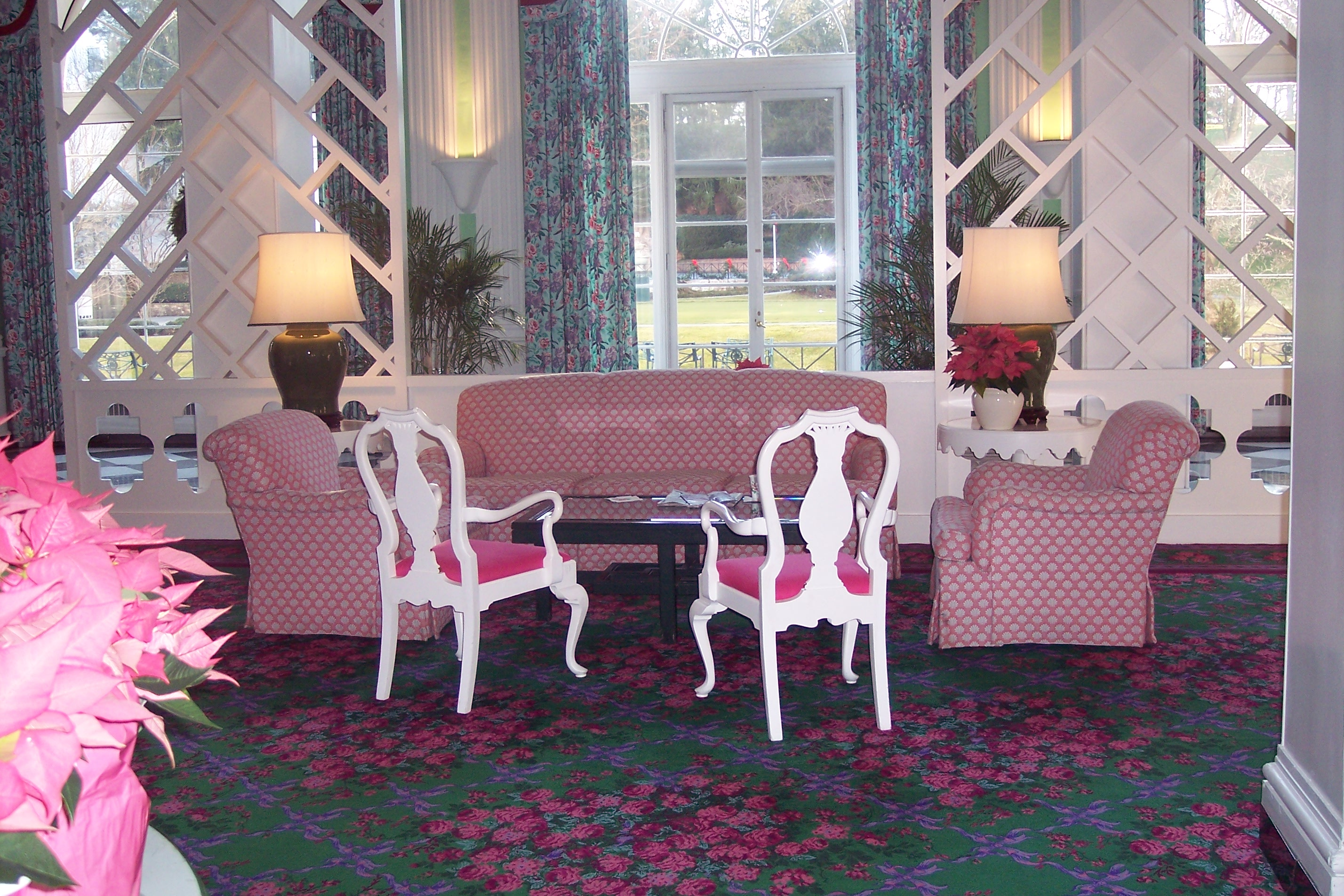
Greenbrier

== See also ==
- List of casinos in the United States
- List of casino hotels
