= National Greyhound Association =

- Formation: 1906
- Headquarters: Abilene, Kansas, US
- Website: https://www.ngagreyhounds.com/

The National Greyhound Association (NGA) is the primary registry body for racing purebred Greyhounds in the United States. Its main purposes is to provide humane advocacy, welfare policy and support to the adoption network. The association serves to provide policy and maintain standards of care to preserve the greyhound breed and bloodlines, and is located on Old 40 Highway in Abilene, Kansas, near the Greyhound Racing Hall of Fame.

Non-racing greyhounds are registered in the U.S. by the American Kennel Club.

== History ==
The National Greyhound Association, a voluntary non-profit association operated in accordance with the laws of Kansas, is the sole registry for racing greyhounds in North America.

Organized in 1906, it has functioned as a registry, maintaining records on the breeding, whelping, ownership, transfers, leases, etc. The National Greyhound Association's identification system plays a role in maintaining the integrity of greyhound racing. The association's primary goal is to promote the improvement and development of the greyhound breed by maintaining pedigree and stud-book records dating back to the latter part of the 19th century. The organization is an associate member of the World Greyhound Racing Federation and a charter and founding member of the World Alliance of Greyhound Registries.

In 1987, in conjunction with the American Greyhound Track Operators Association, the NGA founded the American Greyhound Council, an organization that oversees greyhound health, welfare and adoption programs.

== Greyhound adoption ==
One of the last major greyhound adoption agencies in the United States closed permanently in 2022 and it has been increasingly uncommon to find greyhounds in need of adoption, due to the elimination of all but two commercial greyhound tracks in the United States.

Additional groups in the US that facilitate greyhound adoptions now exclusively get their dogs from Ireland or Australia.

== Board of directors ==
The Association is governed by a board consisting of nine members. The nine directors are elected by nine geographical districts. As of 2024, the President of the Association is Julia Ward and the executive director is James Gartland.
