= Wheeling Island Hotel-Casino-Racetrack =

Betting facility

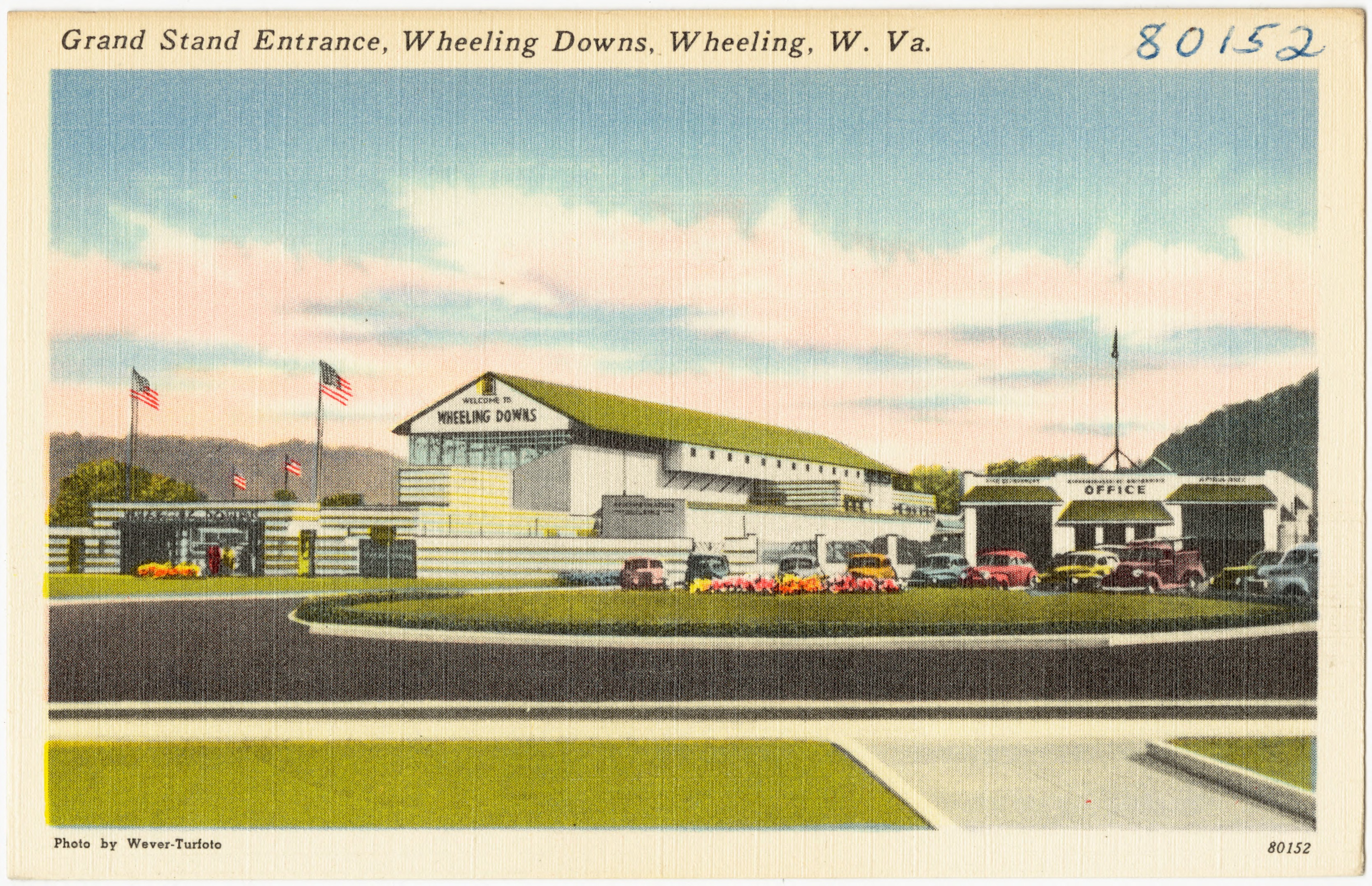
- 1940s postcard showing grandstand
- Interactive map of Wheeling Island Hotel-Casino-Racetrack
- Location: Wheeling, West Virginia
- Coordinates: 40.0628°N 80.7322°W
- Owned by: Delaware North
- Date opened: 1937
- Race type: Greyhound

Wheeling Island Hotel-Casino-Racetrack (formerly Wheeling Downs) is a greyhound racino located on Wheeling Island in the middle of the Ohio River, which is a part of the city of Wheeling, West Virginia. It is located just off the Wheeling Island exit of I-70, about two hours east of Columbus, Ohio. The casino is also located approximately one hour southwest of Pittsburgh, Pennsylvania.

Since January 2023, Wheeling Island is one of only two live greyhound tracks in the United States, along with Mardi Gras Casino and Resort in Nitro, West Virginia. Both are owned by Delaware North.

== History ==
Prior to the race track, in 1890, the area was the location of the Island Grounds or Wheeling Grounds, and featured the only major league baseball game ever played in West Virginia, when the Pittsburgh Alleghenys hosted the New York Giants on September 22.

Wheeling Downs began its life as a thoroughbred horse race track in 1937 and continued in that capacity until a 1962 fire heavily damaged the property, keeping it closed for the next 5 years. When it reopened, it switched to standardbred harness racing. During this period, attendance at the park languished.

Greyhound racing was introduced in August 1976, in order to boost both attendance and revenue. It was at this point that horse races ended. During the 1980s, Wheeling Downs ranked third or fourth in the country in amounts wagered in the then 42 dog tracks around the country.

Slot machines first arrived in 1994. In June 2007, as revenue from greyhound racing declined, Ohio County voters approved a referendum permitting table games. These were rolled out in phases later that year, with poker first appearing on October 19 and the other games on December 20.

From fall 2012 to 2015, the casino served as the site of the Wheeling Jamboree, the second oldest country music radio broadcast in the United States after the Grand Ole Opry.

== Ownership ==
The Ogden Corporation bought the track in 1969, and were the ones who introduced greyhound racing. In 1988, Ogden sold Wheeling Downs to Delaware North, a global food service and hospitality company headquartered in Buffalo, New York. From 1994 to 2001, Delaware North co-owned Wheeling Downs with Wheeling-Pittsburgh Steel.

== Current Facility ==
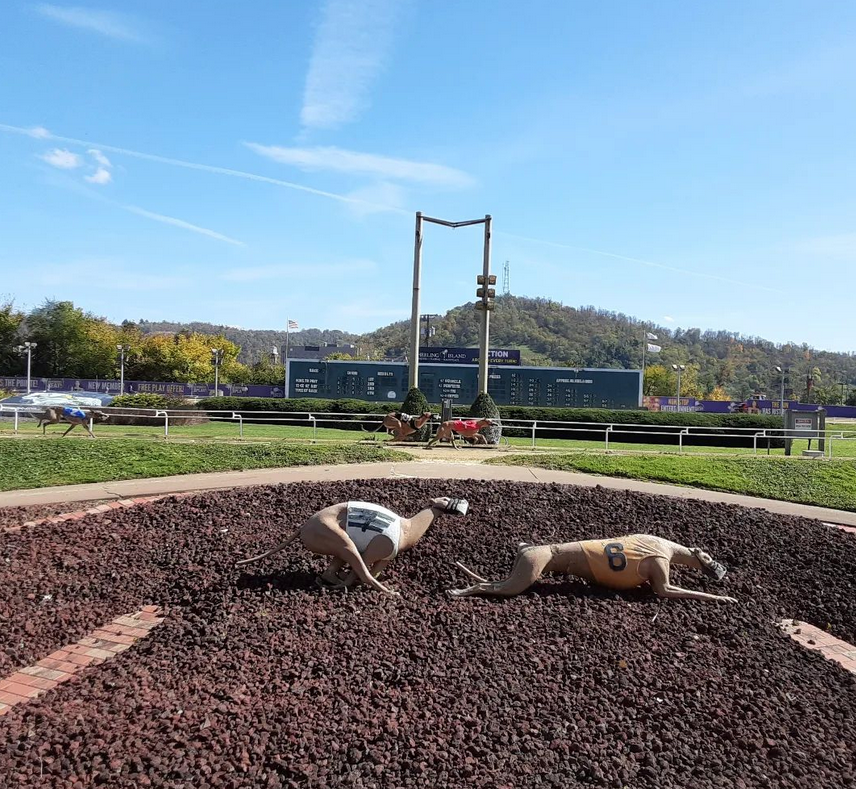
Greyhounds racing at Wheeling Island Hotel-Casino-Racetrack in October 2022. Live greyhounds in the background and statues in the foreground.

Wheeling Island Casino features slot machines, which are marketed under the term 'video lottery' in West Virginia, live greyhound racing, and off-track betting for both greyhound and horse racing. In addition, there are table games including poker, blackjack, craps, and roulette. Wheeling Island features several restaurants and food operations as well, in addition to live concerts and boxing.

Greyhound racing is conducted each afternoon from Wednesday through Sunday at 1 PM, with Monday and Tuesday being dark days without racing. Each day's racing program consists of between 15 and 20 races. Spectators are admitted free and races can also be streamed online.

The facility has a "tropical" theme, with a logo features a palm tree and tropical colors, although Wheeling Island is located far from the tropics. However, Wheeling Island, a low-lying area surrounded by the Ohio River, is prone to flooding. Consequently, the casino floor is elevated some ten-and-one-half feet above ground level, in an attempt to avoid flooding in the event of a hundred-year flood.

== See also ==
- Greyhound racing in the United States
- Mardi Gras Casino and Resort
- List of casinos in West Virginia
- List of casinos in the United States
- List of casino hotels
