= Green Mountain Race Track =

Former race track in Vermont, United States

Coordinates: 42°45′22″N 73°14′00″W

Green Mountain Race Track was an American horse racing and a greyhound racing track located in Pownal, Bennington County, Vermont that operated from 1963 to 1993.

== History ==
Thoroughbred and standardbred horse racing events were held until 1976, when thoroughbred racing was replaced by greyhound racing. One year later, standardbred racing was also discontinued, and the track exclusively featured greyhound racing until closing altogether in 1992 amid pressure from animal rights activists, who objected to greyhound racing as cruel. Vermont banned greyhound racing completely in 1995.

After closing as a racetrack, the site hosted live events occasionally, including a rock concert in the Lollapalooza series in 1996, and antique car shows from 2005 to 2008.

On May 7, 2004, the 144-acre (0.58 km^{2}) property went on sale on eBay with a listed price of $2.5 million. It was quickly bought by Progress Partners Ltd. in a $1 million deal with the previous track owner, John C. Tiegtens.

=== 2018 ===
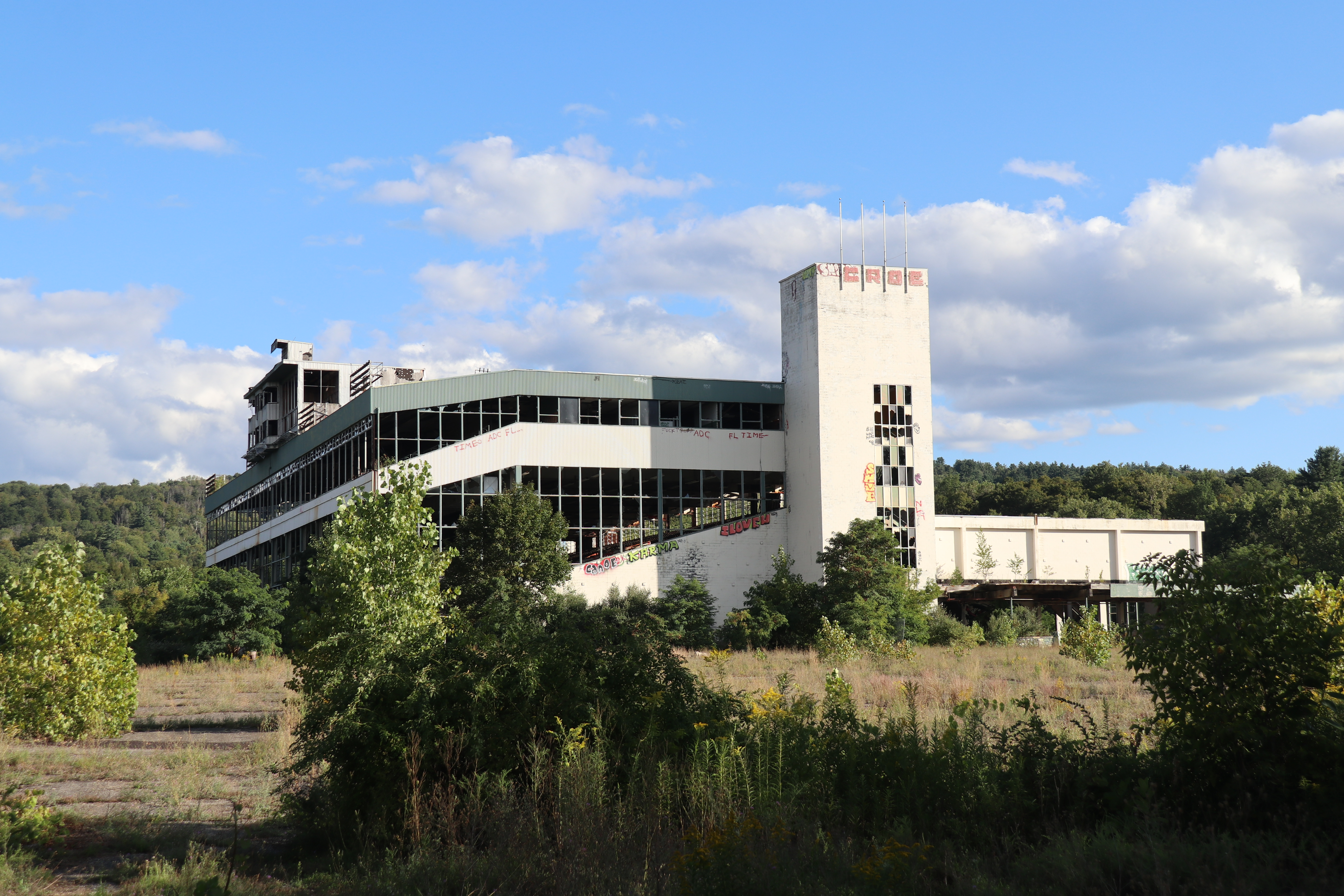
The grandstand, as seen in August 2025.

Around January 2018, mortgage holder Bayview Loan Serving, LLC, of Coral Gables, Florida, filed a lawsuit in Bennington Superior Court Civil Division seeking to foreclose on the former Green Mountain Race Track property. The lawsuit named the current owner, Green Mountain Race Track, LLC as well as a former track ownership group and two other mortgage holders, and the entities involved with the solar array on the property that was installed in 2013. Bayview, the lending service seeks for foreclosure over the unpaid balance on a mortgage on the 144-acre track site off Route 7. The loan, first issued in 2004, was modified in August 2009, that added accumulated interest, after a similar foreclosure complaint that had been also filed by Bayview.

The future for the track is unclear. Some proposed plans were believed to include a mix of energy-efficient companies, a farmers' market facility, and facilities to accommodate large events.

=== 2020 ===
During the night of September 16–17, 2020, the racetrack grandstand building was gutted by a fire. Despite the fire, the grandstand remained standing, and as of March 2023, the state of Vermont is considering demolition.
