= Mardi Gras Casino and Resort =

Casino in Nitro, West Virginia

Coordinates: 38°25′14″N 81°48′36″W

Mardi Gras Casino
- Interactive map of Mardi Gras Casino
- Location: Nitro, West Virginia, USA
- Address: 1 Greyhound Drive
- Notable restaurants: The French Quarter Restaurant; The Grill at First Turn; The Bayou Buffet; Quick Bites
- Owner: Delaware North
- Website: www.mardigrascasinowv.com

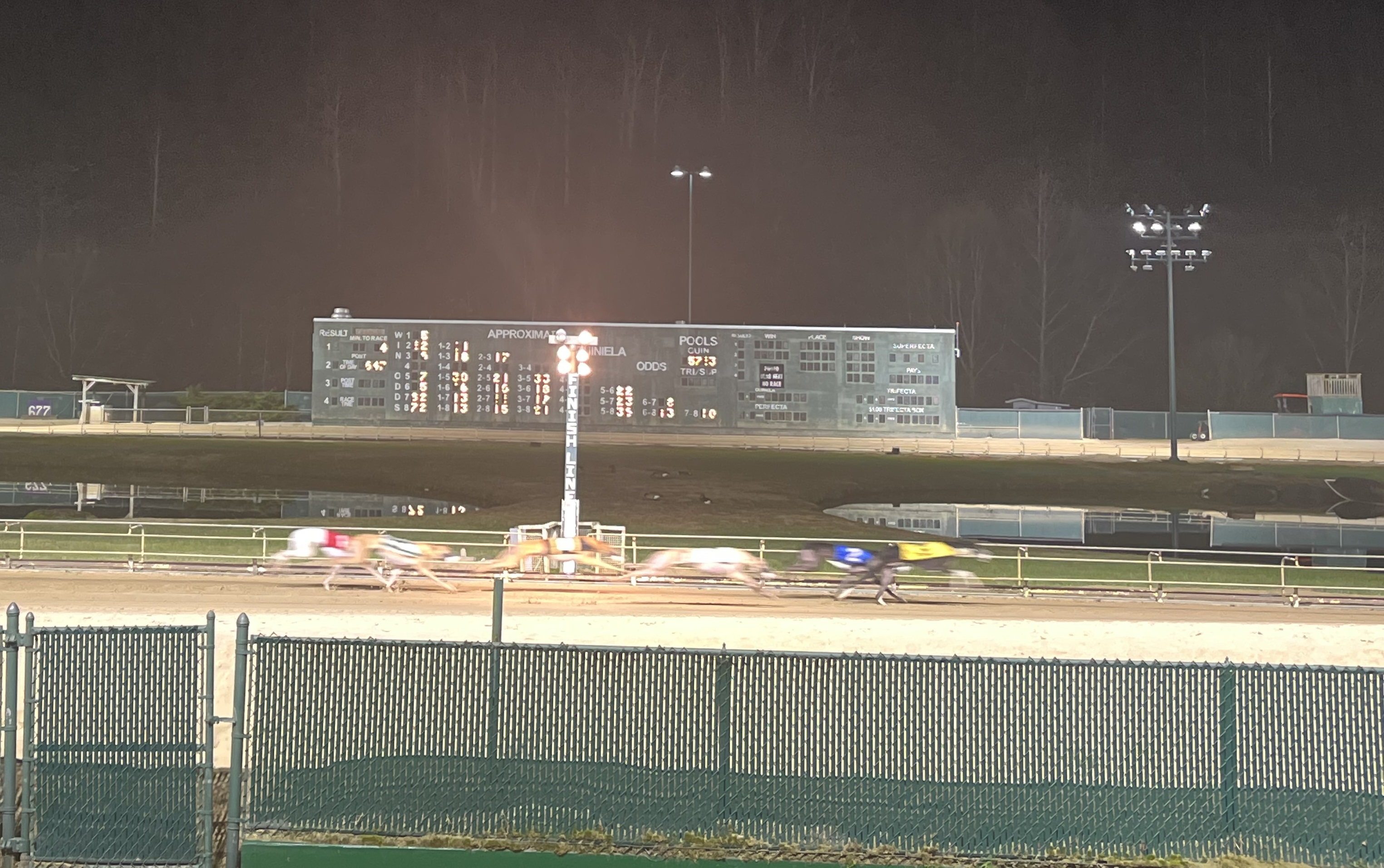
Greyhounds racing at Mardi Gras Casino in Nitro, West Virginia in December 2023

Mardi Gras Casino and Resort is a casino and greyhound racing venue located in the city of Nitro, West Virginia. It is located just off the Cross Lanes exit of I-64, 14 miles west of Charleston, West Virginia and 36 miles east of Huntington, West Virginia. Although it is located within the city of Nitro, it is served by the neighboring Cross Lanes post office.

It features table games, slot machines, live greyhound racing, and off-track betting for both greyhound and horse racing. It also features several restaurants, food operations and a 150-room luxury hotel. The facility has a Mardi Gras theme.

== History ==
The facility was opened in 1985, as Tri-State Racetrack and Gaming Center, focusing specifically on greyhound racing. Slot machines were added in 2002. After casino gambling was legalized in 2007, the track expanded its casino offerings in 2008, and the facility was renamed Tri-State Casino and Resort. It currently has a large poker room, and offers the table games of blackjack, roulette, craps, three card poker, Mississippi stud, and Crisscross Poker.

It adopted is current name in 2010, a change made to reflect its Mardi Gras theme.

In March 2018, Hartman & Tyner sold the property to Delaware North, the owner of West Virginia's only other greyhound racing track, Wheeling Island Hotel-Casino-Racetrack. Since January 2023, they have been the only two remaining greyhound racing venues in the United States.

== Today ==
Live greyhound racing is conducted each evening from Tuesday through Saturday at 6 PM, with Sunday and Monday being dark days without racing. Each day's racing program consists of between 15 and 20 races. Spectators are admitted free and races can also be streamed online.

== See also ==
- Greyhound racing in the United States
- Wheeling Island Hotel-Casino-Racetrack
- List of casinos in West Virginia
- List of casinos in the United States
- List of casino hotels
