= Advance-deposit wagering =

Form of betting on horse races

Advance-deposit wagering (ADW) is a form of gambling on the outcome of horse races in which bettors must fund their account before being allowed to place bets. ADW is often conducted online or by phone. In contrast to ADW, credit shops allow wagers without advance funding; accounts are settled at month-end. Racetrack owners, horse trainers and state governments sometimes receive a share of ADW revenues.

It typically involves betting on horse or greyhound racing. Wagering may take place through parimutuel pools.

== Legality ==
=== United States ===
In the United States, advance-deposit wagering is regulated through a combination of federal law, state racing laws, and state racing-commission licensing. Interstate pari-mutuel wagering on horse racing is governed by the Interstate Horseracing Act of 1978 (IHA), codified at 15 U.S.C. Chapter 57. The IHA defines an "interstate off-track wager" as a legal wager placed or accepted in one state on a horserace taking place in another state, and includes pari-mutuel wagers, where lawful in each state involved, "placed or transmitted by an individual in one State via telephone or other electronic media and accepted by an off-track betting system in the same or another State". The Act further provides that no person may accept an interstate off-track wager except as provided in the Act, and that an interstate off-track wager may be accepted by an off-track betting system only if consent is obtained from the host racing association, the host racing commission, and the off-track racing commission.

In 2025, the United States Court of Appeals for the Sixth Circuit considered the scope of the IHA in Churchill Downs Technology Initiatives Co. v. Michigan Gaming Control Board, a case involving TwinSpires' acceptance of wagers from Michigan residents through its Oregon-based wagering hub. The court stated that the IHA allows an off-track betting system to accept interstate wagers if it obtains consent from three entities: the host racing association, the host racing commission, and the off-track racing commission. The Sixth Circuit held that Michigan could not condition the legality of interstate wagers on additional state requirements that added to the IHA's consent scheme, stating that "Michigan can't craft its own consent requirement and call it a condition to legality". The court distinguished state regulation of wager types or a wholesale ban on horserace wagering from state requirements that target the federal consent framework for interstate off-track wagers.

Illinois was the first state to offer ADW and has allowed its adult residents to participate in ADW since 1999 under the Illinois Horse Racing Act of 1975; Illinois receives a cut of ADW revenues. Shortly thereafter, Connecticut, Maryland, New York, Oklahoma, and Pennsylvania allowed the practice as well. By 2011, 28 states expressly allowed advance-deposit wagering, with 13 remaining in a legal "grey area" because the practice was not explicitly prohibited by state law.

Two U.S. racing commissions are commonly used for multi-jurisdictional ADW licensing. Oregon licenses multi-jurisdictional account-wagering hubs; the Oregon Racing Commission states that it regulates multi-jurisdictional account-wagering hubs licensed in Oregon and publishes information about ADW companies, affiliates, totalizer companies, licensing, and pari-mutuel handle statistics. Oregon administrative rules refer to a "multi-jurisdictional simulcasting and interactive wagering totalizator hub" and define an ADW hub as a business that conducts pari-mutuel wagering through qualified subscriber-based services. North Dakota separately licenses service providers and account-deposit wagering websites; North Dakota rules define "account wagering" or "account deposit wagering" as pari-mutuel wagering funded through a deposited account balance and state that it includes advance-deposit wagering. The North Dakota Racing Commission publishes licensed internet ADW sites and service providers.

Availability varies by operator because some states require direct licensing, while other states are served by operators licensed through multi-jurisdictional hubs. One industry legal guide states that ADW is available in 39 states, while its state list identifies 41 states in which at least one legal horse-racing betting site is available.

Reported ADW availability by state
State	Reported ADW availability
Alabama	Available
Alaska	Not reported as available
Arizona	Available
Arkansas	Available
California	Available
Colorado	Available
Connecticut	Available
Delaware	Available
Florida	Available
Georgia	Not reported as available
Hawaii	Not reported as available
Idaho	Available
Illinois	Available
Indiana	Available
Iowa	Available
Kansas	Available
Kentucky	Available
Louisiana	Available
Maine	Available
Maryland	Available
Massachusetts	Available
Michigan	Available
Minnesota	Available
Mississippi	Not reported as available
Missouri	Available
Montana	Available
Nebraska	Available
Nevada	Not reported as available
New Hampshire	Available
New Jersey	Available
New Mexico	Available
New York	Available
North Carolina	Available
North Dakota	Available
Ohio	Available
Oklahoma	Available
Oregon	Available
Pennsylvania	Available
Rhode Island	Available
South Carolina	Available
South Dakota	Not reported as available
Tennessee	Available
Texas	Not reported as available
Utah	Not reported as available
Vermont	Available
Virginia	Available
Washington	Available
West Virginia	Available
Wisconsin	Available
Wyoming	Available

==== Multi-jurisdictional ADW operators ====
Major U.S. ADW operators include the following. Availability varies by state, and some brands or websites operate under another company's wagering license, platform, or affiliate arrangement. Oregon's 2025 multi-jurisdictional wagering handle report lists AmWest Entertainment, Churchill Downs Technology Initiatives Company, eBet Technologies, Game Play Network, NYRA Bets, ODS Technologies, and Xpressbet as online wagering licensees. North Dakota's 2026 internet ADW service-provider list includes AmWest Entertainment, Game Play Network, Lien Games Racing, PariBet, US Off-Track, WatchandWager.com, and Xpressbet.

Operator	Brands, sites, or affiliated ADW products	Multi-jurisdictional license listing	Notes
1/ST Technology / Xpressbet, LLC	Xpressbet, 1/ST BET, 1/ST SELECT, BETMIX	Oregon and North Dakota	Xpressbet is listed in Oregon's 2025 multi-jurisdictional wagering handle report and in North Dakota's 2026 internet ADW service-provider list. Xpressbet states that customers can access Xpressbet, 1/ST BET and BETMIX through a 1/ST account. 1/ST BET terms state that the 1/ST BET app and website, together with the 1/ST SELECT website, are affiliates of Xpressbet, LLC; the same terms identify Xpressbet, LLC as a multi-jurisdictional account-wagering hub licensed in Oregon.
AmWest Entertainment, LLC	AmWager.com, Bet.trackinfo.com, GiddyUp.us, Onlineracing.tv, Saratogabets.com	Oregon and North Dakota	AmWest Entertainment is listed in Oregon's 2025 multi-jurisdictional wagering handle report and in North Dakota's 2026 internet ADW service-provider list. AmWager states that its parent company is AmWest Entertainment LLC and that AmWest is licensed and regulated by the Oregon Racing Commission as a multi-jurisdictional account-wagering provider. GiddyUp's terms state that GiddyUp is an authorized operating affiliate of AmWest and that AmWest holds a multi-jurisdictional simulcasting and interactive wagering totalizator hub license issued by the Oregon Racing Commission.
Churchill Downs Technology Initiatives Company	TwinSpires, DK Horse	Oregon	Churchill Downs Technology Initiatives Company is listed in Oregon's 2025 multi-jurisdictional wagering handle report. TwinSpires terms identify Churchill Downs Technology Initiatives Company as the operator of TwinSpires.com. DK Horse terms state that DK Horse wagering services are operated by Churchill Downs Technology Initiatives Company with a license to use the DK Horse and DraftKings Horse brands.
eBet Technologies, Inc.	EmpireCityBets, HorsePlayersBet, IdaBet	Oregon	eBet Technologies is listed in Oregon's 2025 multi-jurisdictional wagering handle report. EmpireCityBets states that it is powered by eBet Technologies through eBet's licensed multi-jurisdictional account-wagering hub in Oregon. HorsePlayersBet similarly states that it is powered by eBet Technologies through a licensed Oregon multi-jurisdictional account-wagering hub. IdaBet states that it is owned by eBet Technologies and licensed and regulated under Oregon law.
Game Play Network, Inc.	HorsePlay	Oregon and North Dakota	Game Play Network is listed in Oregon's 2025 multi-jurisdictional wagering handle report and in North Dakota's 2026 internet ADW service-provider list for HorsePlay.com.
Lien Games Racing, LLC	OffTrackBetting.com, PlayUp Racebook, RushBetAndWin.com, IronBetsRacing.com, Spree.bet, MyWinners.com	North Dakota	The North Dakota Racing Commission lists Lien Games Racing, LLC as a 2026 ADW service provider for these internet sites.
NYRA Bets, LLC	NYRA Bets, Caesars Racebook	Oregon	NYRA Bets is listed in Oregon's 2025 multi-jurisdictional wagering handle report. Caesars Entertainment and NYRA Bets announced Caesars Racebook as a horse racing account-wagering app using the NYRA Bets platform; Caesars Racebook terms state that the service is operated by NYRAbets, LLC with a license to use the Caesars brand.
ODS Technologies, L.P.	TVG, FanDuel Racing, 4NJBets	Oregon	ODS Technologies is listed in Oregon's 2025 multi-jurisdictional wagering handle report. FanDuel Racing describes itself as building on TVG's horse-wagering legacy. FanDuel states that horse racing is offered through the FanDuel Racing app, FanDuel Sportsbook app in certain states, TVG in certain states, and 4NJBets in New Jersey.
PariBet, LLC	PariBet	North Dakota	The North Dakota Racing Commission lists PariBet, LLC as a 2026 ADW service provider for PariBet.com.
US Off-Track, LLC	Greyhound Channel, USOffTrack	North Dakota	The North Dakota Racing Commission lists US Off-Track, LLC as a 2026 ADW service provider for GreyhoundChannel.com and USOffTrack.com.
WatchandWager.com, LLC	WatchandWager	North Dakota	The North Dakota Racing Commission lists WatchandWager.com, LLC as a 2026 ADW service provider for WatchandWager.com.

==== Impact in New York ====
Chapter 58 of the New York State Laws of 2012 added a new Section 911 to the New York State Racing, Pari-Mutuel Wagering and Breeding Law (Racing Law). Section 911 requires the New York State Racing and Wagering Board (Board) to assess the impact of advanced deposit wagering (ADW) in New York State including, but not limited to:

- The impact of out-of-state account wagering providers (OSAWP) accepting wagers from New York State residents;
- The annual dollar amount wagered by New York State residents through OSAWPs;
- The number of OSAWP accounts held by New York State residents;
- Information concerning New York State residents who utilize OSAWPs including residency.

Section 911 of the Racing Law required that the study, along with any recommendations, be submitted to the Governor and the Legislature by September 15, 2012.

The results of the survey revealed that New York residents bet $165,567,707 in 2010 and $142,246,859 YTD 9/30/11 through the responding OSAWPs. This includes wagering on the New York racing product and on out-of-state racetracks. Table 1 provides detail of the handle by New York racetracks and out-of-state racetracks. The Board estimates this handle will exceed $200,000,000 in 2012.

The survey also showed that OSAWPs listed 18,769 accounts in 2010 and 21,310 accounts in YTD 9/30 2011 as New York resident accounts. All 62 New York State counties are represented. Table 2 lists the number of accounts by the county in which the zip code originated. Table 2-A lists the number of accounts by statutorily defined Off-Track Betting Regions. NJ Account Wagering, Sol Mutuel, Global Wagering Solutions and Elite Turf Club reported having no New York accounts.

=== Australia ===
In Australia, wagering via telephone or via the internet is primarily controlled via the Interactive Gambling Act 2001 (Cth). As of 2024, almost all usage of credit on these services, including use of credit cards to fund an ADW account, is prohibited under section 15C of the Act.

Initial amendments to the Act in 2017 prohibited provision of credit by the operator to those physically present in Australia, but permitted use of an independently-issued credit card to fund the account.

On 11 June 2024, new provisions included by the Interactive Gambling Amendment (Credit and Other Measures) Act 2023 (Cth) came into effect, prohibiting most online or telephone operators from accepting any credit card, card linked to a credit facility, or digital currency for any purpose. These amendment in effect make all online and the vast majority of telephone-based gambling providers in Australia ADWs by law, although unlike the United States the specific term is generally not used colloquially.

Limited exceptions apply to non-automated, telephone-only operators where annual turnover (or expected turnover) is less than A$30 million. Gambling providers can also provide credit to each other, under conditions set by the relevant minister, for purposes such as laying off of bets.

Physically provided bookmaking operations do not fall under the Interactive Gambling Act, and thus are regulated through state and territory legislation.
