= Oakland Athletics relocation to Las Vegas =

MLB franchise relocation

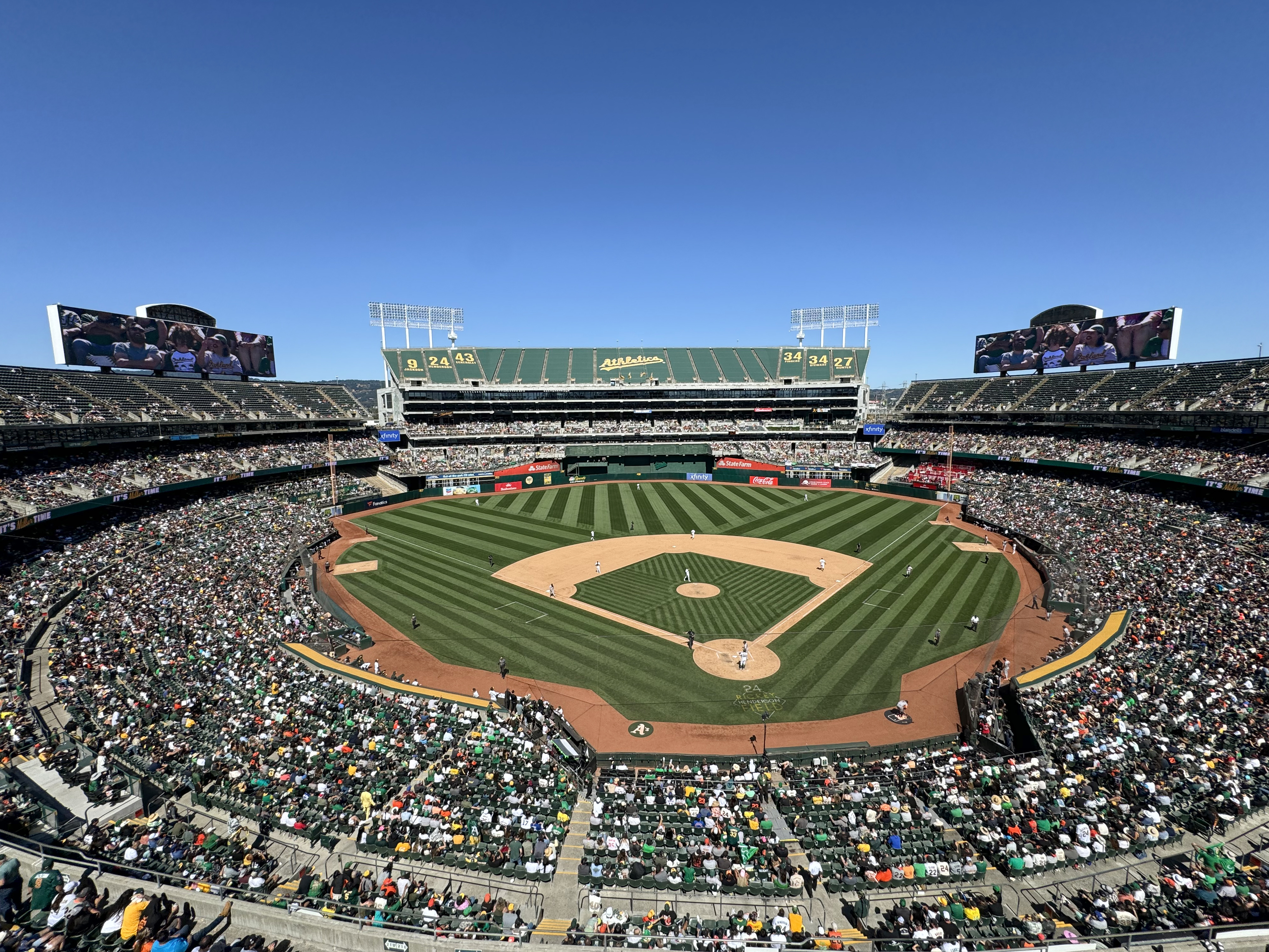
The Oakland Coliseum, pictured in 2024, was the home field of the Athletics throughout their entire tenure in Oakland.

The Oakland Athletics relocation to Las Vegas is an effort by the owners of the Athletics of Major League Baseball (MLB) to move the franchise from Oakland, California, to the Las Vegas metropolitan area in Nevada. The team was based in Oakland from 1968 through 2024, during which it won four World Series titles. The move would make them the second major sports franchise to move from Oakland to Las Vegas, after the Oakland Raiders of the National Football League (NFL) had done so in 2020. With four locations, the Athletics have had the most homes of any MLB team.

The effort follows years of failed attempts to replace the Oakland Coliseum with a new stadium in the Bay Area. In 2023, the team announced it would build a new ballpark in the Las Vegas Valley. On June 15 of that year, Nevada governor Joe Lombardo signed an MLB stadium funding bill worth $380 million, known as SB1. In August, the team sent MLB its formal application to move, which received unanimous approval at the November owners meeting in Arlington, Texas.

The Athletics' lease with the Oakland Coliseum expired at the end of the 2024 season. During the 2025 season, and again in 2026, they played at Sutter Health Park in West Sacramento, California. The move to Las Vegas would mark the third intercity move for the franchise, which played in Philadelphia and Kansas City before their 1968 move to Oakland. The team will be the first American League team to move since 1972, when the Washington Senators moved from Washington, D.C., to the Dallas–Fort Worth suburban city of Arlington, becoming the Texas Rangers; and the first MLB team since 2005, when the Montreal Expos left Montreal for Washington, D.C., to become the Washington Nationals. The proposed move has drawn severe community criticism of Athletics owner John Fisher.

== Background ==
The Oakland Athletics were founded as a charter member of the American League (AL) in 1901 as the Philadelphia Athletics and shared the same city with the Philadelphia Phillies of the National League (NL). Between 1901 and 1954, the Athletics played their home games at Columbia Park and Shibe Park in Philadelphia under the ownership of Connie Mack. In 1955, Mack sold the Athletics to Chicago businessman Arnold Johnson, who moved the team to Kansas City, Missouri, to become the Kansas City Athletics and play at Municipal Stadium. After Johnson died from cerebral hemorrhage while watching the Athletics' spring training in Florida, the team was sold to another Chicago businessman, Charles O. Finley.

Finley sought to move the team out of Kansas City as early as 1961, when he courted Dallas-Fort Worth. Four years later, he signed an agreement to move the team to Louisville, proposing to rename it the "Kentucky Athletics," but the American League blocked the move. Finley also considered moves to Atlanta, Milwaukee (home of the Atlanta Braves from 1953 to 1965), New Orleans, San Diego, and Seattle. In 1968, Finley chose to move the Athletics to Oakland and share the newly built Oakland Coliseum with the American Football League (AFL)'s Oakland Raiders.

The Athletics became Oakland's third professional sports team, after the Raiders and the Oakland Seals of the National Hockey League (NHL), who had begun play a few months earlier as part of the 1967 NHL expansion. Oakland would become a four-sport city in 1971, when the San Francisco Warriors of the National Basketball Association (NBA) moved across the San Francisco Bay from San Francisco to Oakland and renamed themselves as the Golden State Warriors. It lost this status after five years, when the Seals (by then renamed the California Golden Seals) moved to Cleveland, Ohio, and became the Cleveland Barons that eventually folded in 1978.

The Athletics' streak of success in the city in the early 1970s, known as the "Swingin' A's" era, saw the team win three straight World Series titles in 1972, 1973, and 1974. By the end of the decade, the team was in a full-fledged rebuild as Finley had considerably reduced investments into the team and many star players left to other teams via trades and the new free agency process. To save money, Finley severed the team's local television and radio broadcasting contracts, making it more difficult for fans to follow the team. Attendance plummeted at the Oakland Coliseum, reaching a low point on April 17, 1979, when only 653 fans attended a game against the Seattle Mariners.

Finley, by this point, had begun to explore selling the Athletics to another buyer who would move the team from Oakland, with Denver and the aforementioned New Orleans as options. Louisiana Superdome officials pursued negotiations with Athletics officials during the 1978–79 baseball offseason about moving the Athletics to their new state of the art facility, but the plot was foiled when Finley failed to terminate the franchise’s long term lease at the Coliseum and the A's ultimately remained in Oakland. In 1980, Finley agreed to sell the team to a Denver interest in industrialist Marvin Davis, but when the Raiders announced their move to Los Angeles shortly after that same year, the city of Oakland and Alameda County refused to allow the Athletics to break their lease at the Coliseum. Finley was forced to sell the team in August 1980 to Levi Strauss & Co. CEO Walter A. Haas Jr., who promised to keep the team in Oakland.

Haas dramatically increased spending on the Athletics, which made three consecutive trips to the World Series and the title in 1989 over the cross-bay San Francisco Giants in the notorious 1989 Loma Prieta earthquake-interrupted series. When the Raiders returned to Oakland in 1995, the Coliseum was renovated to increase its capacity for football with a structure known as Mount Davis, which made the facility less than ideal for baseball as the large section of seats above forced them to add tarpaulin and obscured the picturesque view of the hills of Oakland. After Haas’ unexpected death in 1995, the team was sold to Stephen Schott and Ken Hofmann. In 1999, Schott and Hoffman put the team up for sale and had an agreement to sell the team to an ownership group led by the Save Mart Supermarkets CEO Robert Piccinini and sports executive Andy Dolich, who planned to build a new, more modern ballpark in Oakland. MLB commissioner Bud Selig thwarted the deal by ordering the owners to table the vote.

In 2001, the Athletics began looking at Oakland sites for a new ballpark, starting in Uptown and the Estuary, but neither those nor another at 66th Avenue gained traction. In 2005, the Athletics were sold to Lew Wolff and John Fisher in what turned out to be a controversial move. Joe Lacob, who would become the owner of the Warriors in 2010, later revealed that he had an agreement with Schott and Hoffman to purchase the team, but Selig had blocked that sale so the team could be sold to Wolff, a college fraternity brother. After the sale, a plan for a ballpark in Fremont known as Cisco Field to replace the aging and outdated Coliseum was proposed and failed. Wolff and Fisher turned their attention to a possible move to San Jose with the same proposal, which was blocked by the Giants owners who had territorial rights to the city. Around this time, the Raiders announced their impending move to Las Vegas and the Warriors moved across the Bay again to the Chase Center in San Francisco, leaving the Athletics as Oakland's only major professional team. The Athletics renewed their attempts to get a new stadium solely in Oakland, with the Coliseum, Peralta's Laney College and Howard Terminal considered, but the lack of progress derailed these proposals. It was this lack of progress that led the franchise to pursue Las Vegas as their new home.

== Planning the move ==
=== Early stages and negotiations ===
The team launched an advertising campaign called "Rooted in Oakland", to emphasize the club's apparent commitment to building a ballpark in its longtime home city before shifting their focus to Las Vegas.

On May 11, 2021, MLB permitted the Athletics to explore moving if the team failed to get a replacement stadium from the city of Oakland by 2024. Among the cities and regions under consideration by the team was the Las Vegas area, the home of the National Hockey League (NHL)'s Vegas Golden Knights and National Football League (NFL)'s Las Vegas Raiders. The A's organized meetings with local government officials and toured potential sites led by Fisher. After a presentation at a June MLB owners meeting in New York City, team president Dave Kaval said that the A's were considering ballpark sites in the Resort Corridor, the Cashman Field site, and the Valley cities of Henderson or Summerlin, Nevada. Kaval also said that the team was still continuing to explore "parallel paths" in Oakland and elsewhere.

In September 2021, Kaval said that the Athletics would finalize the list of possible ballpark sites in Las Vegas by November. In November, the A's launched a survey for fans of the Las Vegas Aviators, the team's Triple-A affiliate, to determine interest for an MLB team in Las Vegas and a new ballpark. The survey's results, released a month later, indicated that most Aviators fans and Las Vegas residents were interested in having an MLB team in the city. That same month, the A's made an offer for an undisclosed plot of land in the Valley as the site for a $1 billion ballpark. The Howard Hughes Corp, the owners of the Aviators, offered free land for the A's to build a new ballpark. Previously, team representatives had met with the Hughes Corp. in Summerlin.

In April 2022, the A's narrowed the list to two sites in the Las Vegas Strip: the Tropicana Las Vegas resort and the Las Vegas Festival Grounds. Around the same time, the Tropicana's non-land assets were sold to Bally's Corporation and approved by Nevada state regulators later that year. Before the Bally's acquisition, in December 2021, the A's had submitted a bid to acquire the Tropicana site and build a ballpark. MLB, in reaction to the A's interest in Nevada, decided that no moving fee would be charged to the A's if they moved to Las Vegas. In August, A's officials held two meetings with casino owner and financier Paul Ruffin to talk about ballpark on the Festival Grounds.

In October 2022, Oakland missed a deadline to reach an agreement on a ballpark in the Howard Terminal, with negotiations pushed back a year. Kaval said that the delay in negotiations would "all but doom our efforts" to keep the team in Oakland. On October 29, Commissioner of Baseball Rob Manfred said that he was "not positive" the A's could remain in Oakland and that the team had made progress in exploring a possible move to Las Vegas.

In November 2022, a source familiar with the Athletics' negotiations with Las Vegas said that even if the team were to move to the city, the Triple-A Aviators would stay put and temporarily share Las Vegas Ballpark with their MLB affiliate while a new ballpark was under construction. On November 3, Bally's CEO Lee Fenton said that the Tropicana site was "very much in the cards" as a ballpark site and revealed that Bally's had held talks with the team. On November 7, then-Nevada Governor Steve Sisolak and other officials said that the state would not use a hotel room tax to fund a Las Vegas ballpark for the A's as they did with Allegiant Stadium for the Raiders; he did not rule out other ways of publicly financing the ballpark, such as infrastructure improvements or tax-increment financing.

In January 2023, the Athletics continued talks with Bally's about converting the Tropicana into a ballpark while talks with Ruffin over the Festival Grounds stalled. Meanwhile, the Department of Transportation (DOT) refused to grant $182 million in federal funding for the Howard Terminal project and the city of Oakland was considering obligation bonds as an alternative. On January 26, new Nevada Governor Joe Lombardo met with team officials to discuss a public-private economic partnership to finance a new ballpark; he ruled out an increase in state taxes to pay for construction. Lombardo's spokesperson said that the A's or another MLB team looking to move to Nevada "may or may not be eligible for a variety of existing economic development programs in the state".

In February, it was revealed that Resorts World Las Vegas President Scott Sibella and other Las Vegas hotel owners had met with Athletics officials for a ballpark at the Festival Grounds site. Sibella said, "We reinforced our support that we believe the best site is on the Sahara/L[as] V[egas] Blvd. Having the A's in Las Vegas will be great for the Strip communities and the LV community" and that the team "will have our full support". Derek Stevens, the co-owner of the Circa, Golden Gate and The D properties downtown, confirmed that he attended the meeting and said, "I talked to with ownership in John Fisher and their President Dave [Kaval] for a while yesterday. This will be very good for Las Vegas, very good for jobs, very good for hotel rooms. The key thing is getting the location nailed down and moving forward." Stevens also made a case for luring the A's to southern Nevada over an expansion team, claiming, "If Vegas doesn't land the A's, it could impact whether Vegas gets a team anytime in the near future. Having the [MLB] Commissioner [Rob Manfred] waive the relocation fee is huge. When people say they want an expansion team that is a 'Vegas Team,' people forget the expansion fee will be between $1 billion to $2 billion. Who in Vegas has that kind of money for an expansion fee and THEN have to deal with all the other elements like stadium costs and operating cash?" On February 17, it was revealed that the Athletics were exploring the Rio hotel and casino as an option for a new ballpark and spoke with their owner, Dreamscape Properties. The team also hired eleven lobbyists to persuade the Nevada Legislature to approve a public-private partnership.

After the Athletics' two-day games at Las Vegas Ballpark as part of Big League Weekend, Clark County Commission Chairman Jim Gibson said, "The governor has said no new taxes, but that doesn't mean there aren't public revenues available. We'll look to the governor and legislature to see what kind of appetite they have for whatever's required."

=== Agreement and switching focus to Tropicana ===
In April 2023, it was revealed that negotiations between the city of Oakland and the Athletics organization had ended, with the team moving forward with a new $1.5 billion 30,000-seat retractable stadium at the site of the Wild Wild West Gambling Hall & Hotel across Interstate 15 from the Golden Knights' T-Mobile Arena, financed through a public-private partnership including a special tax district after reaching an agreement with Red Rock Resorts to purchase and develop the land, with the backing of many within the state of Nevada and MLB. The deal would have also required $500 million in public funding from the special tax district to finance the ballpark and would need approval from the Nevada Legislature with June 5, the end of the regular legislative session, as the deadline to agree on a funding package and could call a special session in this case. Before selecting the Wild Wild casino, the Athletics were offered the resort corridor of the Rio hotel and casino for $1 by the Dreamscope Cos but turned it down in favor of Wild Wild West after a previous deal on the Festival Grounds had collapsed. Oakland Mayor Sheng Thao said, "it is clear to me that the A's have no intention of staying in Oakland and have simply been using this process to try to extract a better deal out of Las Vegas. I am not interested in continuing to play that game. The fans and our residents deserve better."

Within the legislature, lawmakers said that a funding bill would arrive and that there was no timeline for immediate action yet; there was some skepticism or opposition to handing out $500 million for the ballpark.

Shortly after announcing the stadium deal, team president Dave Kaval was interviewed by CBS affiliate KLAS-TV. He revealed that the Athletics had an agreement with the Aviators to play at the Las Vegas Ballpark in Summerlin temporarily until their new home on the Strip was complete. Conversely, Aviators president Don Logan said that the natural grass field of Las Vegas Ballpark would not accommodate the team and the Athletics with a proposal to implement artificial turf on the stadium based on the Texas Rangers' Globe Life Field floated which was toured by the Athletics as a model for the new Strip ballpark while Rob Manfred has said that it was a feasible option for the A's to share Las Vegas Ballpark with the Aviators. By April 22, the Athletics would reach a deal with the Southern Nevada Building Trades Union to use workers and contractors from the area to build the new Strip ballpark which is expected to begin construction in mid to late 2024 and was contingent on the state of Nevada approving a financing package.

Fans protest Fisher's proposed move to Las Vegas

On April 26, Kaval met with Nevada Democratic legislators, including Assembly Speaker Steve Yeager, to discuss the new ballpark for half an hour. By April 28, the Athletics' ballpark would earn the support of several southern Nevada Chambers of Commerce. Las Vegas Mayor Carolyn Goodman when asked about the $500 million needed for the ballpark responded "To make this work the owners need to make a bold statement upfront. What you want to see is the private ownership come in and be invested in our community and not just look to each of us who calls this home for more taxes. No thank you!" However, Goodman's Clark County was negotiating with the Athletics to reach a deal on the ballpark with an option to extend the negotiations.

In response to the team's planned move to Las Vegas, Athletics fans would hold a protest during the team's April 28 home game against the Reds, holding up signs that read "Sell", "Stay", "#FisherOut", "Kaval=Liar" and "Sell the Team" with the latter chanted in the stands along with "Stay in Oakland", the phrase used by Oakland Raiders fans urging the team to remain in Oakland. Controversially, the official MLB broadcast of the game cropped out these signs, leading the league to apologize. "We were unaware of the edit. When it came to our attention, we corrected it as it isn't consistent with our policy", said a spokesperson.

On May 4, Lombardo announced that a legislative package for the Athletics' proposed ballpark on the Las Vegas Strip is being created with an initial deadline of May 26 with other options, such as a special session if it can't be passed in time. However, the Athletics are considering alternative options in the Las Vegas area if they fail to secure legislative support for $500 million in the new Strip ballpark. Additionally, language for a potential funding bill would likely be available at the end of the week. Despite it, the Athletics struck a deal with Bally's to build a new ballpark on the previously explored Tropicana Las Vegas site and reduce the share of public funding from $500 million to $395 million while Bally's would build a casino-hotel adjacent to the ballpark; the tax package for the revised proposal was similar to the original one at Wild Wild West Gambling Hall & Hotel but the legislative language still needed to be finalized. The deal was announced by the Athletics and Bally's on May 15. In response to the Bally's deal, Nevada Department of Transportation spokesman Justin Hopkins told the website LVSportsBiz.org, "Our project team would like to know more about the Athletics' construction plans, including their anticipated start date and how their access needs will be affected by the construction. We want to ensure that we coordinate with their needs and any other ongoing work in the area, as we strive to be good partners with our community and stakeholders. If there are any adjustments we can make to our schedule or prioritize certain tasks to facilitate potential stadium work, we would like to know so that we can act quickly," though he added "NDOT has not yet heard from the Athletics about the ballpark proposal at Tropicana." Aside from the deal with Bally's, the Athletics pitched a tax district to pay for the new Strip ballpark. The reason the Athletics switched the site of the proposed ballpark from Wild Wild West Casino to the Tropicana Las Vegas was due to Culinary Union 226's not supporting the site change.

By May 12, Culinary Union 226 eventually reached an agreement with the Athletics to provide union contracts for their workers on the new Strip ballpark. However, the project initially had an issue with Nevada lawmakers who were willing to provide only $195 million in tax credits instead of $395 million for the Athletics. Moreover, Clark County officials were concerned that taxpayers would be on the hook to cover debt payments and that property taxes would be increased to pay them. In spite of this, the Athletics reached a "loose agreement" for a financing package less than $500 million with state officials after weeks of discussion with a reduction of contributions from Clark County. The proposal involved $180 million from the state of Nevada of which $90 million would be repaid from the ballpark's revenues while $150 million would come from Clark County which would be repaid from a tax district set up on the site and the public total would be between $350 million and $380 million. Additionally, a credit enhancement would be used for the ballpark to improve the chances of repayment along with a two-year debt reserve account and the ballpark itself would be owned by the Las Vegas Stadium Authority, similar to Allegiant Stadium upon completion while Gaming and Leisure Properties Inc. contributed to the project free of charge.

On May 24, Governor Joe Lombardo announced the agreement with the Athletics, Treasurer Zach Conine, and Clark County officials in a press release for the bill's sending to legislature. In the press release, Lombardo said, "This agreement follows months of negotiations between the state, the county and the A's, and I believe it gives us a tremendous opportunity to continue building on the professional sports infrastructure of southern Nevada. Las Vegas is clearly a sports town, and Major League Baseball should be a part of it." By May 26, the Athletics released the first official renderings of the new $1.5 billion, 30,000-seat ballpark on the site of the Tropicana. While the Athletics released the renderings of the new ballpark, Darrell Steinberg has said that the city of Sacramento could temporarily host the team for three seasons at Sutter Health Park, the home of the Triple-A Sacramento River Cats (a former A's affiliate now affiliated with the Giants), until they move to Las Vegas.

==== Legislative sessions and approval ====
With the unveiling of the first renderings of the ballpark, the Athletics also saw the language for the stadium bill revealed publicly, which contained many of the confirmed details of the tentative agreement, such as public funding capped at $380 million and the Las Vegas Stadium Authority (LVSA) as its owner with the bill itself, named the Southern Nevada Tourism Innovation Act, introduced into the Nevada Legislature for a vote. By Memorial Day 2023, the legislature held its first and only regular session hearing on the Southern Nevada Tourism Innovation Act with officials, residents and some out of state people speaking for or against the bill which lasted for six hours. New details of the ballpark were also revealed, such as 2028 as the projected opening date instead of 2027 and the potential to host other events apart from Major League Baseball, which included the World Baseball Classic (WBC), WWE Royal Rumble and SummerSlam, XFL games, MLS matches, rugby sevens, NCAA games, the Monster Jam World Finals, the Davis Cup, Monster Energy Supercross, and cricket.

On June 7, Lombardo called for a special session for the legislature to vote on the Southern Nevada Tourism Innovation Act at 10 am, with the Senate Committee of the Whole convening by 12 noon to discuss the bill with support and opposition from both state senators and citizens. On June 8, the legislature adjourned and the Senate would not reconvene on the bill until June 12 as there were amendments proposed for the bill. The reconvening ended in recess without a vote in the Senate although behind the scenes negotiations with lawmakers continued and the Assembly would announce a morning meeting on the bill through a Committee of the Whole which became the first time they would review it alongside the Senate. During the hearing, the stadium bill received amendments such as a community benefits agreement and more money repaid to Nevada state tax credits. The amended bill would eventually be approved by the Senate Committee of the Whole (COW) in a 12–7 vote and sent to the Senate floor for another vote where it was approved 13–8 with the bill in the Assembly. The Assembly would then vote to approve the bill 25–15 with amendments and the Senate would concur ensuring it would end up with Governor Lombardo on June 14. Shortly after SB1's approval in the legislature, the team released a statement thanking legislators for passing the bill during the special session. With SB1 approved, Bally's fully turned its attention to demolishing the Tropicana to make way for the Athletics' ballpark. During the special session on the bill, Las Vegas Convention and Assembly President Steve Hill said the Athletics could play some games in Reno at the Reno Aces' Greater Nevada Field while their new home on the Las Vegas Strip was under construction.

Additionally, US House Representatives Barbara Lee and Mark DeSaulnier introduced the Moneyball Act in the House named after the 2003 memoir of the same name by Michael Lewis which required the Athletics or any MLB team moving 25 miles (40 km) from its former home city to compensate them or the league would lose its antitrust exemption.

On June 15, Manfred addressed reporters during the three-day MLB owners' meeting in New York after the Legislature approved SB1. He said that the Athletics would apply to move and establish a committee to define the operating and broadcast territories surrounding the Las Vegas Valley, headed by Milwaukee Brewers owner Mark Attanasio, before making a recommendation that would go to the executive council and full ownership. During the meeting, Lombardo would sign SB1 into law allowing Nevada to begin work on a new ballpark, and the Athletics to start the moving process.

=== Post-agreement and approval ===
The schedule for the 2024 MLB season had already been set by the time the A's plans to move were announced. That meant that the Athletics played at the Coliseum for that season, which was the team's final year in Oakland. The A's, with MLB's cooperation, looked at options for a temporary home in 2025, with Las Vegas, Reno, Sacramento, and San Francisco's Oracle Park being considered. These plans were later confirmed by an Athletics spokesperson in an interview with The Mercury News while the options in Las Vegas and Reno were contingent on approval from the MLB Players Association (MLBPA). In the case of Reno and Sacramento, both cities had Triple-A facilities that could be used to accommodate the Athletics for three seasons similar to Las Vegas Ballpark in Summerlin. On June 20, the city of Oakland and Alameda County explored the options of forcing the Athletics to pay $30 million in purchase payments for the Coliseum due to its joint ownership of the facility and impending move to Las Vegas.

On June 19, Bally's chairman Soo Kim told KTNV-TV that the Tropicana might not be razed until two years later into construction and that there was a scenario where part of the resort-casino could remain after the ballpark is complete. He also noted that the ballpark would include a new casino-resort and a separate, adjacent sports-themed attraction. On June 21, the Athletics officially began the process to move to Las Vegas by drawing up an application to MLB being written up before being filed, submitted, and put to an owners' vote. Later, several ballpark designers, economics experts and architects discussed the small size of the Athletics' proposed ballpark in the San Francisco Chronicle with some even expressing doubt that it could fit.

Two weeks after the bill's approval, the Athletics revealed that Bally's would provide 3 to 4 more acres of land on the Tropicana for the ballpark with plans to hire a design architect, a construction firm and a project manager amidst concerns about its size and a statement from Clark County spokeswoman Jennifer Cooper saying her county can't issue $120 million yet until other agreements are finalized and the Athletics deposit $100 million in private money for the project.

On June 29, the Nevada State Education Association (NSEA) created a new political action committee known as Schools Over Stadiums for the purpose of exploring "every possible path" of reversing the legislature's and Governor Lombardo's approval of SB1, including litigation or a ballot measure on the bill in 2024, with over 102,586 signatures required for the latter option. In response, a spokesperson for the Athletics said the team was aware of Schools Over Stadiums and the NSEA's earlier opposition to the bill. The NSEA's opposition to SB1 and proposal to get the bill on the ballot for Nevada voters was also supported by the group We Want a Voice which had a similar proposal and would work with the NSEA. Otherwise both were opposed by Nevada's largest teachers union, the Clark County Education Association (CCEA), which considered the matter of SB1 to be settled, and Clark County Commission Chair Jim Gibson echoed similar such sentiments even claiming the bill's additional revenue would be used to help with students, teachers, and other aspects of education.

In July, owners John Middleton of the Philadelphia Phillies and John Sherman of the Kansas City Royals joined the newly formed MLB relocation committee on Las Vegas alongside the Brewers' Attanasio. In the same month, MLBPA executive director Tony Clark said the organization was ready to negotiate with MLB over the effects and working conditions of the Athletics' move to Las Vegas, including a temporary home in Las Vegas, Reno, Sacramento, or San Francisco. The conditions outlined by Clark were focused on the field, travel, amenities, housing, support, and the area for the players and the players' families. When asked about the playing field, Clark said, "We would have to make sure that the quality of that turf, if that's what happens, or the quality of the grass and the support for it, if that's what happens, is up to snuff." Clark also noted that if the Athletics were to play at Las Vegas Ballpark temporarily for three seasons, it would be a challenge due to not having a roof to protect players from the sun and brought up the issues of playing field, health, safety, accommodations, travel, and schedules, and that the MLBPA will have conversations on these issues pertaining to the Athletics possibly sharing it with the Aviators. On Oracle Park, Clark mentioned that the MLBPA could be involved in discussions about having the Athletics play in the same venue with the cross-bay Giants but noted they would engage in a different conversation by the time the votes are cast.

When reports of Reno being considered an option were published, the city's mayor Hillary Schieve said they had not had any conversations with the Athletics organization about sharing Greater Nevada Field with the Aces but were open to discussing the possibility of the proposal.

During the 2023 Major League Baseball All-Star Game in Seattle, Manfred confirmed the Athletics had started the moving process by submitting information for the application. However, Oakland Mayor Sheng Thao met with Manfred during the All-Star Game to share documents with him and 29 other MLB owners outlining the city's plans to build a new ballpark at the Coliseum or Howard Terminal from earlier years in a bid to keep the Athletics from leaving. After Thao met with Manfred, the Athletics announced their sponsorship for the softball charity game Battle for Vegas in Summerlin's Las Vegas Ballpark and a fan fest held alongside this event with the Golden Knights and Raiders, making this first time the team supported an officially-sanctioned event in the Las Vegas area.

On July 13, Hill revealed that the Athletics would not fully use $380 million in public funding to finance the new ballpark at the Tropicana. Instead, the team would use around $340 million for the ballpark. Two days later, Hill said that the Las Vegas Stadium Authority would meet on August 24 to detail the process of the Athletics' move.

On July 20, Kim said that Bally's was waiting for the Athletics to go through the stadium-planning process before the Tropicana could be demolished. He also noted that the Tropicana could be torn down in segments while allowing some of it to remain or brought down all at once via implosion.

On July 25, fans of the Athletics and Giants, during the local Bay Bridge Series between their respective teams at Oracle Park, chanted "Sell the team!" and wore "Sell!" t-shirts as part of Unite the Bay, an event held to protest the Athletics' move to Las Vegas, similar to the Reverse Boycott. After the Unite the Bay rally, the Athletics organization announced they would select Gensler or the joint bid by HNTB (which participated in the construction of Allegiant Stadium) and Bjarke Ingels Group as the design team for the ballpark by November for new renderings with the latter having previously participated in the scrapped Howard Terminal plans. Brad Schrock, the head director of the ballpark design, said that the project could have up to 33,000 seats. Schrock also revealed on July 27 that the ballpark would turn four acres of its site into a plaza similar to T-Mobile Arena.

In August, Kaval revealed that the new stadium in Las Vegas would have 33,000 seats, not 30,000. On August 21, the Athletics announced that the Minneapolis-based Mortenson | McCarthy would serve as the construction manager for the ballpark. On August 23, Fisher published an op-ed in the Las Vegas Review-Journal announcing that the Athletics had fully submitted their application to MLB. On the same day, Fisher told the Review-Journal about the team's impending move to the Las Vegas Valley. By August 25, the Las Vegas Stadium Authority (LVSA) held another meeting on the ballpark.

When asked about a temporary home for 2025–2027, Kaval said a three-year lease extension at the Oakland Coliseum, Las Vegas Ballpark, or Oracle Park were strongly under consideration for the Athletics. He also said that the Las Vegas Ballpark would need upgrades to host the Athletics alongside the Aviators. Thao included a provision to keep the Athletics name and history in Oakland if the team were to play at the Coliseum for three more years alongside an expansion team.

In September, Schools Over Stadiums filed a referendum petition with the office of the Nevada Secretary of State to put the Athletics' stadium proposal for a vote in the 2024 elections by gathering around or more than 100,000 signatures from voting-eligible Nevada residents to do so. By September 7, the Athletics hired the Creative Artists Agency (CAA) sub-division CAA ICON as the official consulting firm for the ballpark project. On September 13, Kaval revealed the new ballpark would be climate-controlled but have a retractable roof. On September 15, MLB reportedly set the vote on the Athletics' move to Las Vegas for November. On September 27, Manfred said he hoped for a vote on the move during the owners meeting in Arlington, Texas, between November 14 and 16. By September 28, Schools Over Stadiums later received a lawsuit from Athletics lobbyists seeking to prevent their petition from being put on the ballot next year.

In October, the Las Vegas Stadium Authority held its first meeting to receive the first drafts of the proposed lease and community-benefits agreements. The Authority said construction for the new stadium was tentatively slated to begin in April 2025 and finish in January 2028. Officials announced a 30-year, rent-free lease for the Athletics; the team would also have the option to buy the stadium, pay for all operations, and maintain "facility standards". The organization also voted to approve a $700,000 retainer for the law firm Hunton Andrews Kurth LLP. By Thursday, Manfred announced that he would make a recommendation on the Athletics' move before the November vote at the owners meeting.

By November, the Schools Over Stadiums' petition to put SB1 on the 2024 ballot was rejected by Nevada District Judge James Todd Russell, who said that the plaintiffs would have to refile their referendum petition with the full text of SB1 or appeal the decision in a higher court on Tuesday. On November 9, Athletics fans sent boxes to 29 MLB owners containing paraphernalia urging them to vote no. On November 14, the committee issued a report on the viability of Las Vegas as a baseball market to the other MLB owners in Arlington. Although the report posed questions about Las Vegas as an MLB city, the Athletics move was expected to be approved by the entire league and there was no organized opposition. Amid the vote, Schools Over Stadiums filed a lawsuit to overturn SB1 after the failed effort to put the legislation on the ballot, led by the local teachers union.

At the meeting, Manfred made a recommendation, and the owners unanimously voted to approve the move. In December, the Stadium Authority and the Las Vegas Convention and Visitors Authority confirmed that the stadium will open by 2028.

=== Vote aftermath ===
On November 28, 2023, the non-profit fan group Oakland 68s created the Oakland Ballers, a team in the independent, MLB-affiliated Pioneer League began play in 2024. The team was established in response to the Athletics' move to Las Vegas and is modeled after their time in Oakland right down to sharing the same color scheme and logo including its abbreviated name.

By March 2024, new renderings of the ballpark were revealed to the public. They showed a fixed roof inspired by traditional baseball pennants, multi-tiered seating, the world's largest cable-net window facing Las Vegas Boulevard, a jumbotron, and a three-acre plaza. The design was created by the Denmark-based Bjarke Ingels Group and HNTB.

On April 2, 2024, the Tropicana Las Vegas permanently closed after 57 years of operation; it was demolished in October to make way for the Athletics' new ballpark.

On April 4, 2024, the Athletics reached an agreement with the San Francisco Giants and their Triple-A affiliate, the Sacramento River Cats, to play at Sutter Health Park in West Sacramento, beginning in 2025.

In May 2024, the Athletics hired investment firm Galatiotio Sports Partners to help raise $500 million for the ballpark. By May 14, the Supreme Court of Nevada rejected Schools Over Stadiums' effort to put public funding for the Athletics' new ballpark on the ballot.

In January 2026, the Athletics' applications to trademark the terms "Las Vegas Athletics" and "Vegas Athletics" were denied by the United States Patent and Trademark Office, which cited the generic nature of the term "athletics."

== Reception ==
=== In Oakland ===
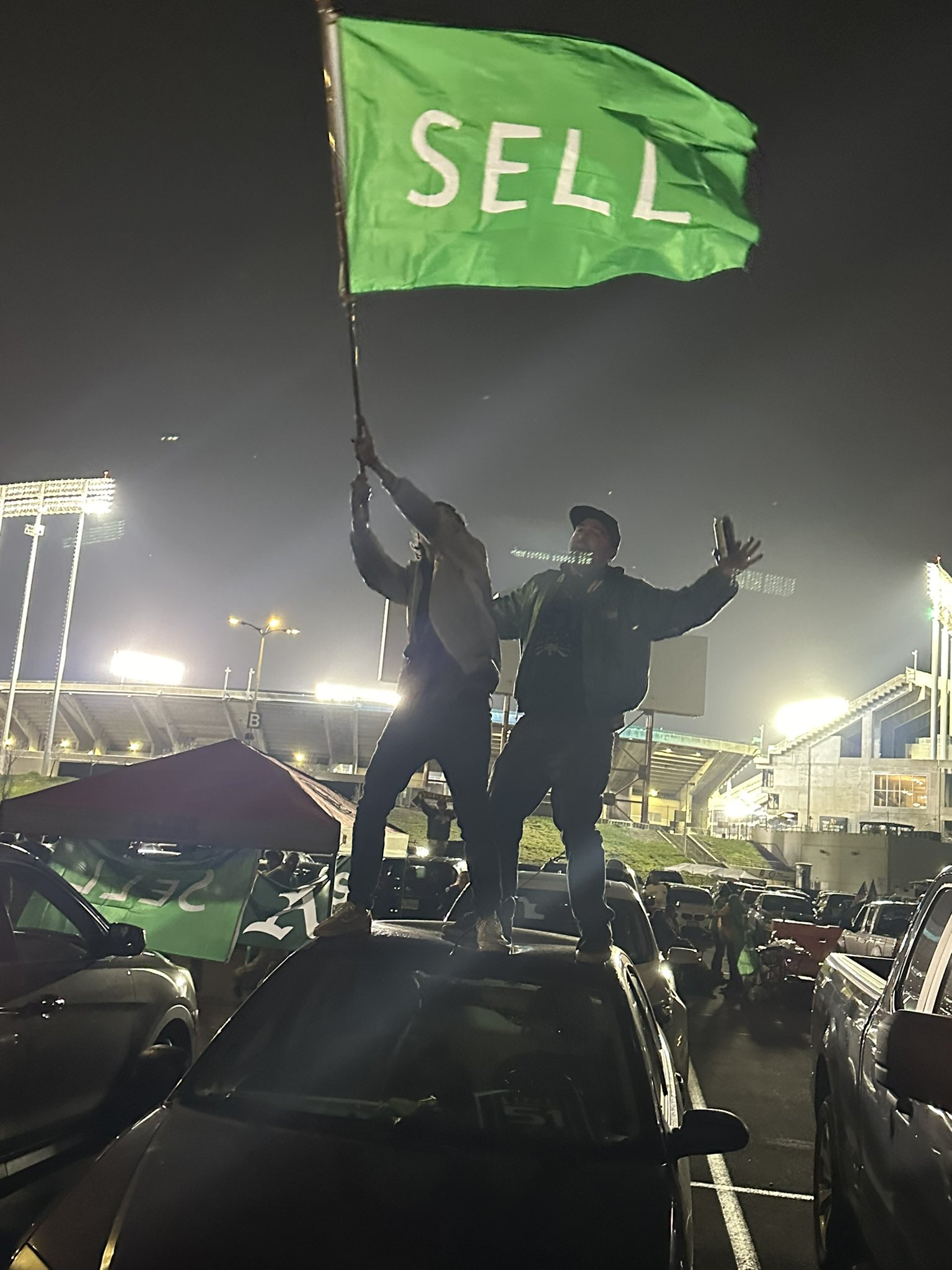
Fans protest during 2024 MLB Opening Day; the Oakland Coliseum is also pictured on background. The green SELL flag became a symbol of the movement against the Athletics' relocation.

The A's plan to move to Las Vegas has garnered an overwhelmingly negative reception from Bay Area fans, baseball writers, former executives, and even some current players, including Las Vegas natives Bryce Harper, Bryson Stott, and Paul Sewald. (Note: Attributed to multiple references:) Many have argued that owner John Fisher's lack of spending on the team was a deliberate effort to sink the club and keep fans away from the Coliseum in order to sabotage negotiations in Oakland. Others have opined that by many measures, such as public money available and market size, Oakland was actually offering the better stadium deal, and that the move was purely an effort for the A's to remain on revenue sharing with no other factors considered, as some commentators have speculated that Fisher was no longer able to afford his part of the Howard Terminal project.

On June 13, 2023, Oakland Athletics fans organized a large "Reverse Boycott" for a random Tuesday night home game at the Oakland Coliseum against the Tampa Bay Rays. Protestors encouraged fans to attend the game to demonstrate that there is still a sizable market for Major League Baseball in Oakland. Fans raised nearly $40,000 in community funding to produce and distribute protest shirts against owner John Fisher reading "SELL," and the game drew the largest home crowd of the year despite being on a weekday night. Chants of "sell the team" and "stay in Oakland" were persistent throughout the game, including an eruption of those "sell the team" chants after a moment of fan-organized silence in the top the 5th inning. Opposing pitcher Tyler Glasnow said the raucous stadium environment reminded him of the 2019 A's-Rays Wild-Card Game at the Coliseum, the best-attended Wild-Card game to that point, with 54,005 people in attendance.

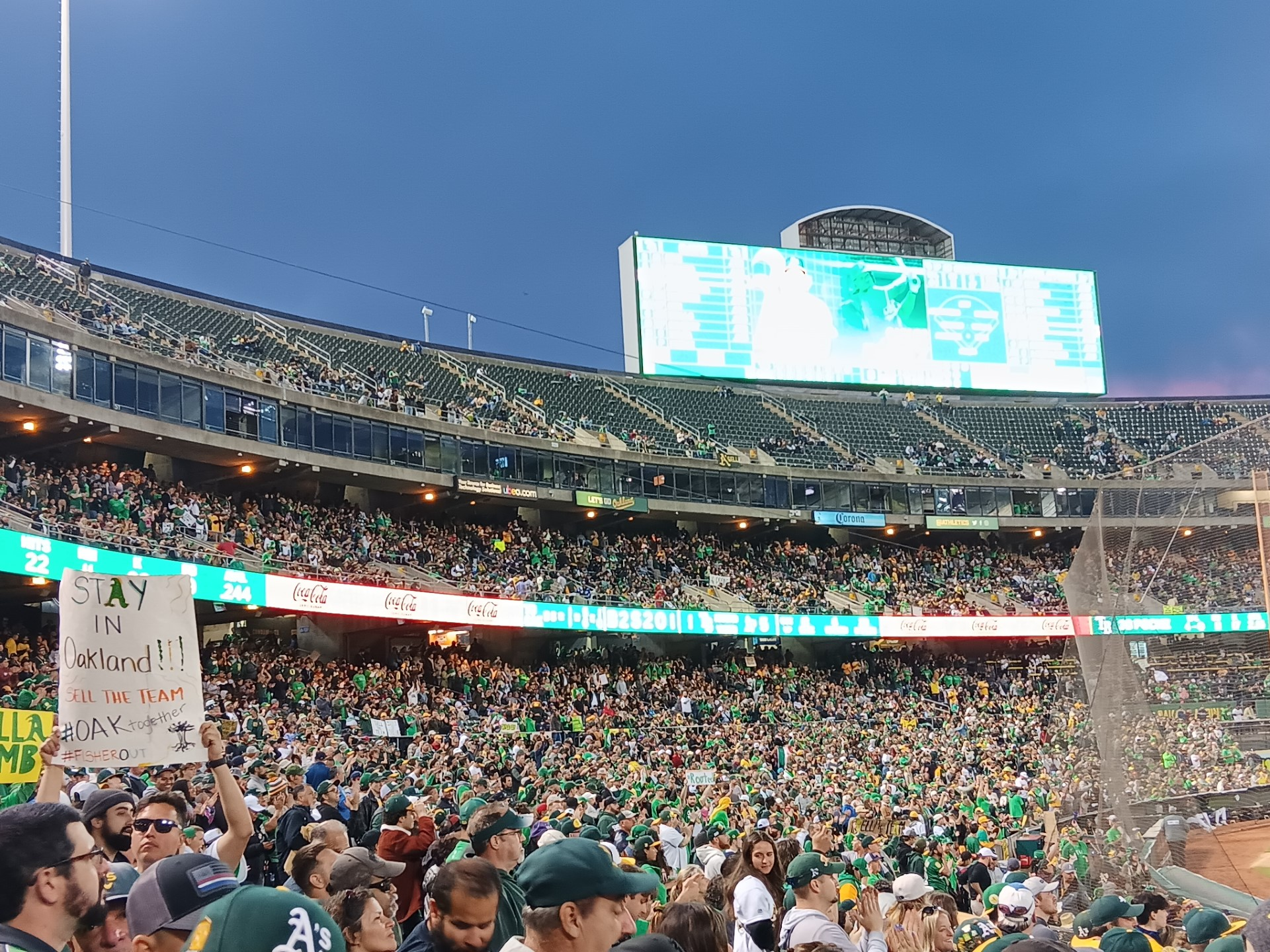
The June 13, 2023 "Reverse Boycott" game, organized to protest the A's impending move to Las Vegas

Outside Oakland, fan protests took place at Oracle Park in San Francisco, Coors Field in Denver, Nationals Park in Washington D.C., and the 2023 MLB All-Star Game at T-Mobile Park in Seattle. Many of Manfred's comments and actions during the process received backlash as well, with several commentators feeling that he was being disrespectful towards Oakland and ignoring the reality of the situation in order to support an owner who could not afford to keep the team in Oakland.

While announcing his retirement on October 16, 2023, former A's pitcher Trevor May spoke negatively of Fisher, criticizing his ownership style and the moving plans. May also openly expressed support for the "Sell" movement during the same commentary.

The last game in Oakland was played on September 26, 2024. It drew a sellout crowd of more than 45,000 fans.

While most of the criticism was directed at Fisher, Kaval, and Manfred, Jon Becker of the San Jose Mercury points out that Bud Selig, the MLB commissioner from 1992 to 2015, is the person most responsible for enabling the move. In 1999, despite overwhelming support by the city of Oakland and investors, along with a verbal agreement and an established plan to build a new ballpark at the Coliseum site by Piccinini and Dolich, Selig blocked the sale and afterwards, he said that moving the Athletics to Oakland in 1968 was "a horrible decision" and "the worst mistake" in baseball history, indicating that he was against the team staying in Oakland and wanted the Giants to be the only Bay Area team. As such, Selig was accused of using his authority as commissioner to direct the sale to his college friend Wolff, who was willing to move the team out of Oakland. This included blocking the sale to Joe Lacob, who was interested in buying the team and building a privately financed ballpark in Oakland, after he reached a verbal agreement; and denying the sale to an ownership group led by Microsoft CEO Bill Gates and former Athletics superstar Reggie Jackson whose bid was higher than what Wolff and Fisher paid. Jackson intended to file a lawsuit against Selig and MLB, but never did, after being warned by top executives that he could be blacklisted from the industry if he filed. Instead of having a normal sale process in which the outgoing owners decide who to sell the team to with the approval process by the other owners being just a formality, Selig used his authority as commissioner to deny approval for any ownership group other than Wolff and Fisher.

Economist J. C. Bradbury, an economics professor at Kennesaw State University and a staunch critic of publicly funded sports stadiums, has cited the A's proposed Las Vegas ballpark as a prime example of a stadium that will have no positive impact on the local economy. Other economists and economics professors have generally agreed with Bradbury's claims.

=== In Las Vegas ===
Former Miami Marlins and Montreal Expos executive David Samson has been heavily critical of Fisher and Kaval, arguing that the A's and Las Vegas have no clear plan for many aspects of the move. Former A's executive Steve Pastorino, who lives in Las Vegas, called Kaval "a walking, talking bobblehead" during public comment on SB1, telling Nevada legislators that they should be distrustful of Kaval and saying "There are so many holes in what the A's are trying to sell us, I can't cover it in two minutes"—the maximum time one person can speak during the public comment session.

At a panel discussion of Las Vegas sports executives hosted by The Nevada Independent on October 9, 2023, representatives from the Las Vegas Raiders, Vegas Golden Knights, and Las Vegas Aces expressed either ambivalence or negativity about the possibility of the A's joining their city. Raiders owner Mark Davis blamed the A's for hindering progress at building a new football stadium for the Raiders in Oakland. It was reported in early 2015 that the Raiders met with Athletics owner Lew Wolff in an effort to create a stadium solution where two separate stadiums (one for the Raiders and one for the Athletics) would have been built on the coliseum site. The Athletics balked at the deal. In an interview with J. T. the Brick on KGMZ on April 4, 2017, Davis revealed that he offered Wolff 20% of the Raiders in an attempt to get a deal done. Davis further elaborated that the closest the Raiders came to a deal in Oakland was in 2013 with Colony Capital, before the Athletics agreed to a 10-year lease extension at the Coliseum with the city of Oakland.

At a Las Vegas Chamber of Commerce event on January 24, 2024, which included a segment about the A's, the mention of the team's potential move drew a tepid response from the crowd, prompting the event's emcee to quip "Are we alive back there, Las Vegas?"

In a podcast interview on February 6, 2024, Las Vegas mayor Carolyn Goodman said the A's should work out a stadium deal in Oakland rather than move. She walked back these comments to an extent later in the day after some criticism, but reiterated her opinion that Oakland is the ideal city for the franchise. In contrast, her successor as mayor, Shelley Berkley, has embraced the A's and said she was looking forward to baseball on the Strip.

Among people who do not work directly for the A's or MLB, those who have written or spoken positively about the move include Lindsey Adler of The Wall Street Journal and sports media personality Chris "Mad Dog" Russo.

== See also ==
- Chase Center, home to the Golden State Warriors since their move from Oakland to San Francisco
- Oakland Raiders relocation to Las Vegas
- Relocation of professional sports teams
- Sports in the Las Vegas metropolitan area
