= Circa Sports =

American sportsbook operator

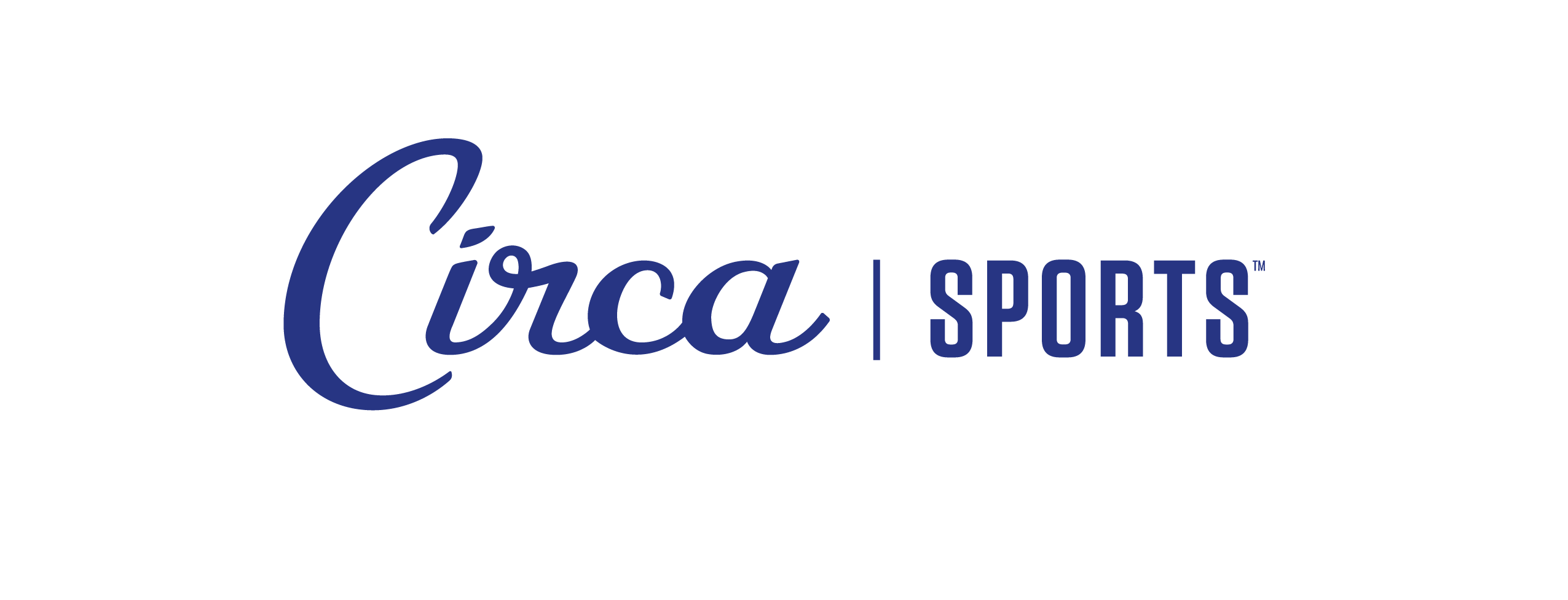
- Industry: Sports betting
- Founded: June 1, 2019
- Founder: Derek Stevens
- Headquarters: Las Vegas
- Number of locations: 8
- Areas served: Nevada, Colorado, Illinois, Iowa, Kentucky, and Missouri
- Key people: Sportsbook director: Matt Metcalf (2019–2023); Chris Bennett (since 2023)
- Owner: Derek Stevens
- Website: www.circasports.com

Circa Sports is an American sportsbook operator based in Las Vegas. It was founded by casino owner Derek Stevens and began operations on June 1, 2019. It is named after Stevens' Circa Resort & Casino in Las Vegas. The resort includes the company's flagship sportsbook, with 1,000 seats spread across three floors. Other locations in Las Vegas include the Golden Gate and The D Las Vegas, both owned by Stevens.

Circa Sports also launched online and mobile app betting in Colorado on July 1, 2020, through a partnership with Century Casinos. The company has since expanded its mobile app operations to Iowa and Kentucky. Illinois operations were launched on September 29, 2023, via mobile app and a sportsbook, the latter in partnership with Full House Resorts. Illinois marks the company's first physical location outside of Nevada.

== History ==
=== Background ===
Circa Sports is named after the Circa Resort & Casino in downtown Las Vegas. The company was founded by Circa owner Derek Stevens, who is a fan of sports and betting. He began visiting Las Vegas in the late 1980s, and was impressed by the sportsbooks at several resorts, including Caesars Palace, the Stardust, the Riviera, and the SuperBook at the Las Vegas Hilton (later known as the Westgate).

Stevens had wanted to operate his own sportsbook since the purchase of downtown's Golden Gate hotel-casino in 2008. However, he did not believe that there was enough volume to support a sportsbook operation. He later purchased Fitzgeralds hotel-casino, also in downtown Las Vegas, and renamed it as The D Las Vegas in 2012. By the end of 2015, Stevens was planning to build the Circa Resort, and he believed that the project would give him enough volume to run a sportsbook company.

In May 2018, the U.S. Supreme Court overturned the Professional and Amateur Sports Protection Act of 1992, which further inspired Stevens to start Circa Sports. He filed for licensing to operate his own sportsbooks in September 2018, and received final approval from the Nevada Gaming Commission on April 25, 2019. Stevens said the books would operate with an "old-school Las Vegas hospitality, where our guests and oddsmakers interact closely in a friendly and fun environment." They would operate as traditional books, but with modern technological features, and would cater to professional bettors as well as newcomers.

Matt Metcalf was hired as sportsbook director for Circa Sports, while Chris Bennett was chosen as sportsbook manager. Metcalf had previously worked for the sportsbook at the Imperial Palace in Las Vegas, as well as the Hilton's SuperBook. Metcalf previously worked with Bennett at the SuperBook and chose him to join Circa Sports. Stevens and Metcalf visited most of the sportsbooks in Las Vegas to gather ideas for Circa Sports, and Stevens also consulted with professional sports bettors. Bennett would succeed Metcalf as sportsbook director in 2023, while Metcalf remained as an advisor.

=== Operations ===
==== Nevada ====
The first Circa Sports book opened at the Golden Gate on June 1, 2019. It measures 1,297 sq ft (120.5 m^{2}). The Golden Gate offered wages and odds not available at most books. For its first day, the Golden Gate book operated with no vigorish. The book took in more than $800,000 on its first day, but lost over $100,000. A mobile phone app also launched on the same day, to attract a younger demographic. In May 2020, amid the COVID-19 pandemic, Circa debuted a temporary curbside betting operation at the Golden Gate.

A second Circa Sports was opened at The D on June 19, 2019. The book there had previously been operated by William Hill. Vegas Golden Knights games are a primary focus at The D's sportsbook. Stevens planned to eventually open the brand's flagship sportsbook at the Circa Resort in late 2020. Operating the two original sportsbooks would help prepare Metcalf and his team for the opening of the main book at the Circa Resort.

The Circa Resort opened on October 28, 2020. The sportsbook there is considered a prime feature, containing 1,000 seats spread across three floors. It also contains a broadcasting studio for the Vegas Stats & Information Network. According to Stevens, it is the largest sportsbook in the world, beating out the 30,000 sq ft (2,800 m^{2}) SuperBook at the Westgate. However, he has not specified the exact size of the Circa book. The new book would continue Circa's reputation for allowing sharp bettors. However, this made the company likely to lose more money than other sportsbooks.

During 2020, Circa Sports announced plans to eventually open a sportsbook at the Tuscany casino, near the Las Vegas Strip. This location opened in March 2021, replacing William Hill as operator. It is a satellite sportsbook, and was opened in time for March Madness, during which Circa Sports accepted $10,000 bets.

Another Circa book opened on April 29, 2021, at The Pass Casino in Henderson, Nevada. In August 2022, Circa opened a location at the new Legends Bay Casino in Sparks, Nevada. It is Circa's sixth location, and also marks the company's debut in northern Nevada. It attracts business from California, where sports betting is illegal. In January 2024, Circa took over sportsbook operations at the Silverton casino in the southwest Las Vegas Valley.

==== Other states ====
In February 2020, Circa Sports announced a 15-year partnership with Colorado-based Century Casinos to provide online and mobile-app sports betting for the latter. Colorado was in the process of legalizing sports betting, and the partnership would mark Circa's first out-of-state venture. There were no plans for Circa to add a physical sportsbook in Colorado, although the company did plan to eventually expand its operations to other states. International Game Technology subsequently agreed to provide its technology to Circa, powering its Colorado mobile app. Circa Sports launched its online services there on July 1, 2020.

By March 2021, Stevens was planning to expand his online services to Iowa, with several other states also in consideration for future expansion. Tax rates, market size, and gaming regulations were factors in determining where to expand. Circa's Iowa operations began on October 7, 2021, offering mobile sports betting through a partnership with Wild Rose Casino, which has three locations in the state.

In May 2022, Circa partnered with Full House Resorts to open a sportsbook in Waukegan, Illinois, marking its first physical location outside of Nevada. The companies signed an eight-year deal, and Circa would initially operate in a temporary casino while Full House constructs a permanent facility, to be known as American Place. The Illinois launch was held on September 29, 2023, via mobile app and the temporary facility. American Place is expected to open by 2026.

In May 2024, Circa expanded its mobile app to Kentucky, in partnership with the Cumberland Run horse track in Corbin.

Circa expanded to Missouri in August 2025 by winning an "untethered" license, meaning that they would not be required to partner with a casino or sports team and pay additional rights fees. Gaming commissioners cited Circa's reputation for allowing larger bets and catering to a different clientele than other sportsbooks as the primary factors for awarding the license. Circa would introduce a Missouri app in November as part of the general launch of sports betting in that state.

== Contests and games ==
In 2019, the company launched the Circa Sports Million contest, which had a guaranteed $1 million grand prize. The contest required a $1,000 entry fee, and participants would bet on NFL games. In addition to the grand prize, the contest would also have quarterly winners. Stevens said, "If you get behind by week eight and there's 3,000 people in front of you, it's tough to catch up. But you can get hot for four weeks and win the quarter. We're essentially giving people four chances to win." The contest was inspired by high bets that Stevens had made in recent years. Metcalf said, "He really likes the idea of someone having the chance to win $1 million. He experienced that firsthand and how exciting it was, and he wanted someone else to have that." The contest needed a minimum of 1,500 people for Circa to make a profit; it garnered 1,875.

Due to its popularity the first year, Circa Sports Million II was launched in 2020, with a $3 million prize. Another NFL contest was also launched that year, titled Circa Survivor. It offered a $1 million winner-take-all prize. Both contests have become annual events. The 2020 contests received fewer entrants due to the pandemic, and Stevens began offering free hotel rooms as an incentive to sign up. In 2021, Circa Millions III and Circa Survivor offered total payouts of $4 million and $6 million respectively.

Circa Sports also launched a Super Bowl squares game in 2020. Due to its popularity, it became an annual event, under the name "Circa Squares".
