= Vegas Stats & Information Network =

Gambling-oriented sports news network

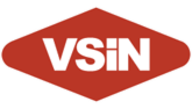
- Type: Sports news

Programming
- Language: English

Ownership
- Owner: Musburger Media

History
- Launched: February 5, 2017; 9 years ago

Links
- Website: vsin.com

Vegas Stats & Information Network (VSiN) is an American sports betting radio network and streaming television channel owned by Musburger Media. Founded in 2017 by the family of sportscaster Brent Musburger, VSIN broadcasts from studios at the Circa Resort & Casino and The D, both located on Fremont Street in Las Vegas, Nevada.

VSiN programming is carried via its own website, as well as other over-the-top services. VSiN also syndicates its programming via local regional sports networks and radio stations.

== History ==
VSiN was founded by talent agent Brian Musburger, attorney Todd Musburger and documentary film producer Dave Berg. Broadcaster Brent Musburger joined VSiN as lead on-air personality after his January 2017 departure from ESPN. VSiN launched on February 5, 2017, with special programming covering Super Bowl LI; the network planned to initially broadcast 12 hours of live programming per-day, which would be broadcast on SiriusXM and stream on the network's website. VSiN would broadcast from a studio at the South Point Hotel, Casino & Spa; the studio would feature glass walls to allow casino guests to see live programming in production, and external microphones to capture the casino floor's ambience.

Former Chicago Tribune Media executive Bill Adee was hired in March 2017 to be chief operating officer, followed by Fox Sports media executive Rick Jaffe, who was hired in May 2017, to be executive producer.

In February 2020, VSiN partnered with iHeartRadio to produce gambling-centric online broadcasts of XFL games. By then, VSiN had studios and bureaus at multiple casinos, including The D Las Vegas (adjacent to its newly-opened sportsbook and sports bar BarCanada), the Mandalay Bay, the Rivers Casino in Des Plaines, Illinois, and the Borgata in Atlantic City.

In October 2020, VSiN added a second main studio at the newly-opened Circa Resort & Casino (which like The D is owned by Derek Stevens); its construction occurred in parallel with the construction of the remainder of the building. The new studio was intended to provide the network with improved production capabilities for video content, as the South Point studio was primarily optimized for audio programming.

In March 2021, the Musburger family sold VSiN to DraftKings, with the Musburgers staying on in executive roles. In September 2023, VSiN moved out of the South Point studio; the studio was retained by the casino and began to produce its own sports betting content.

In July 2024, DraftKings sold VSiN back to the Musburgers for an undisclosed amount.

== Personalities ==
Brent Musburger serves as a lead on-air personality and host for its weekday program My Guys in the Desert, a reference to Musburger's long-time sly references to Nevada bookmakers during game broadcasts as his "friends in the desert".

Alongside Musburger, other on-air hosts employed by VSiN include Mitch Moss, Pauly Howard, Gill Alexander, Ron Flatter, Matt Youmans, Michael Lombardi, Tim Murray, Jonathan Von Tobel, Patrick Meagher, and Wes Reynolds. VSiN also employs Nevada oddsmakers Jimmy Vaccaro, Vinny Magliulo, and Chris Andrews to appear on its broadcasts.

== Distribution ==
At launch, VSiN streamed through its website, and was carried on Sirius XM channel 204. On January 7, 2021, VSiN was dropped by Sirius XM and replaced by SportsGrid Radio. VSiN would later return to Sirius XM in January 2025, moving to channel 158.

In March 2019, VSiN partnered with Anthem Sports & Entertainment to syndicate programming on its Canadian cable network Game+, including A Numbers Game on weekday mornings, and a weekly highlights program.
