= The D Las Vegas =

Casino hotel in Nevada, United States

The D Las Vegas Casino Hotel

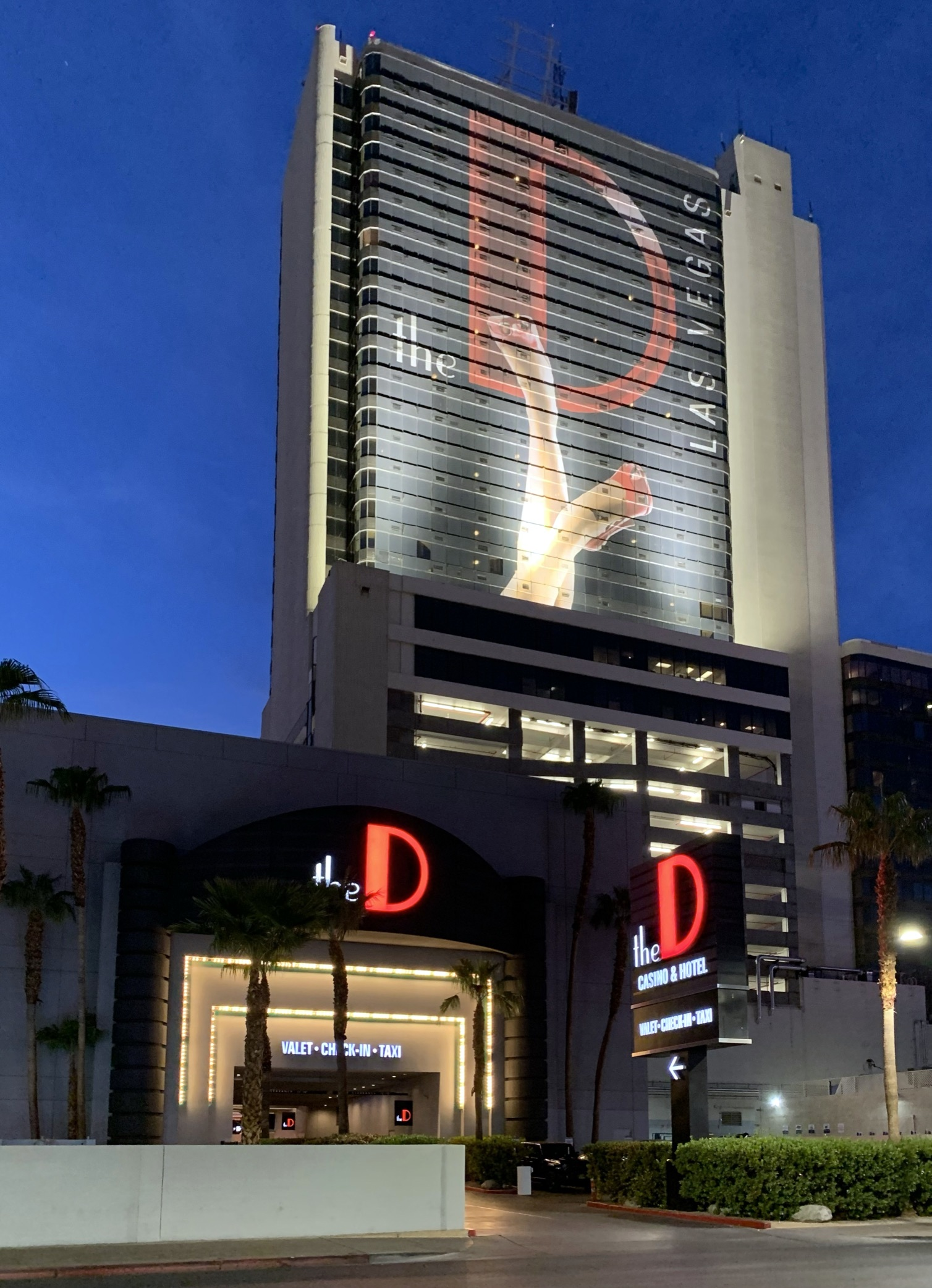

- Location within Downtown Las Vegas Location within Nevada
- Interactive map of The D Las Vegas Casino Hotel
- Location: Downtown Las Vegas, Nevada; 301 Fremont Street; 36°10′11″N 115°8′34″W
- Opened: July 2, 1980; 46 years ago
- No. of rooms: 638
- Gaming space: 42,000 sq ft (3,900 m^{2})
- Permanent shows: Marriage Can Be Murder; Defending the Caveman
- Notable restaurants: Joe Vicari's Andiamo Steakhouse; Bacon Nation; American Coney Island
- Casino type: Land
- Owner: Derek Stevens (78%); Greg Stevens (22%)
- Previous names: Sundance Hotel; Fitzgeralds Hotel & Casino
- Renovated in: 2012
- Website: The D Las Vegas

The D Las Vegas Casino Hotel (formerly Fitzgeralds) is a 34-story, 639-room hotel and casino in downtown Las Vegas, Nevada, owned and operated by Derek and Greg Stevens.

The D is located at the eastern end of the Fremont Street Experience. It has a 42,000-square-foot (3,900 m^{2}) casino, several restaurants, a business center, and a pool. The casino has more than 1,000 slot machines and 22 table games located on two floors. It is the second tallest building in downtown Las Vegas and the third-tallest inside the city limits, having been surpassed by Allure Las Vegas in 2007 and Circa Resort & Casino in 2020.

As Fitzgeralds, it had a "luck of the Irish" theme, with shamrocks and a leprechaun. In fall 2012, The D completed a property-wide renovation and rebranding to replace the Irish theme.

== History ==
=== Sundance Hotel (1980–1987) ===
The Sundance Hotel opened on July 2, 1980, on land owned by Moe Dalitz. Dalitz, an organized crime figure, faced difficulty from the Gaming Commission, so the casino was nominally run by his associates, Al Sachs and Herb Tobman, who also owned the Stardust and Fremont casinos.

In 1983, Sachs and Tobman faced suspension of their gaming licenses due to charges of skimming. Dalitz applied to manage the Sundance himself, but the Gaming Commission stalled on his application, until July 1984, when he agreed to surrender management to Jackie Gaughan until the casino could be sold.

=== Fitzgeralds Hotel and Casino (1987–2012) ===
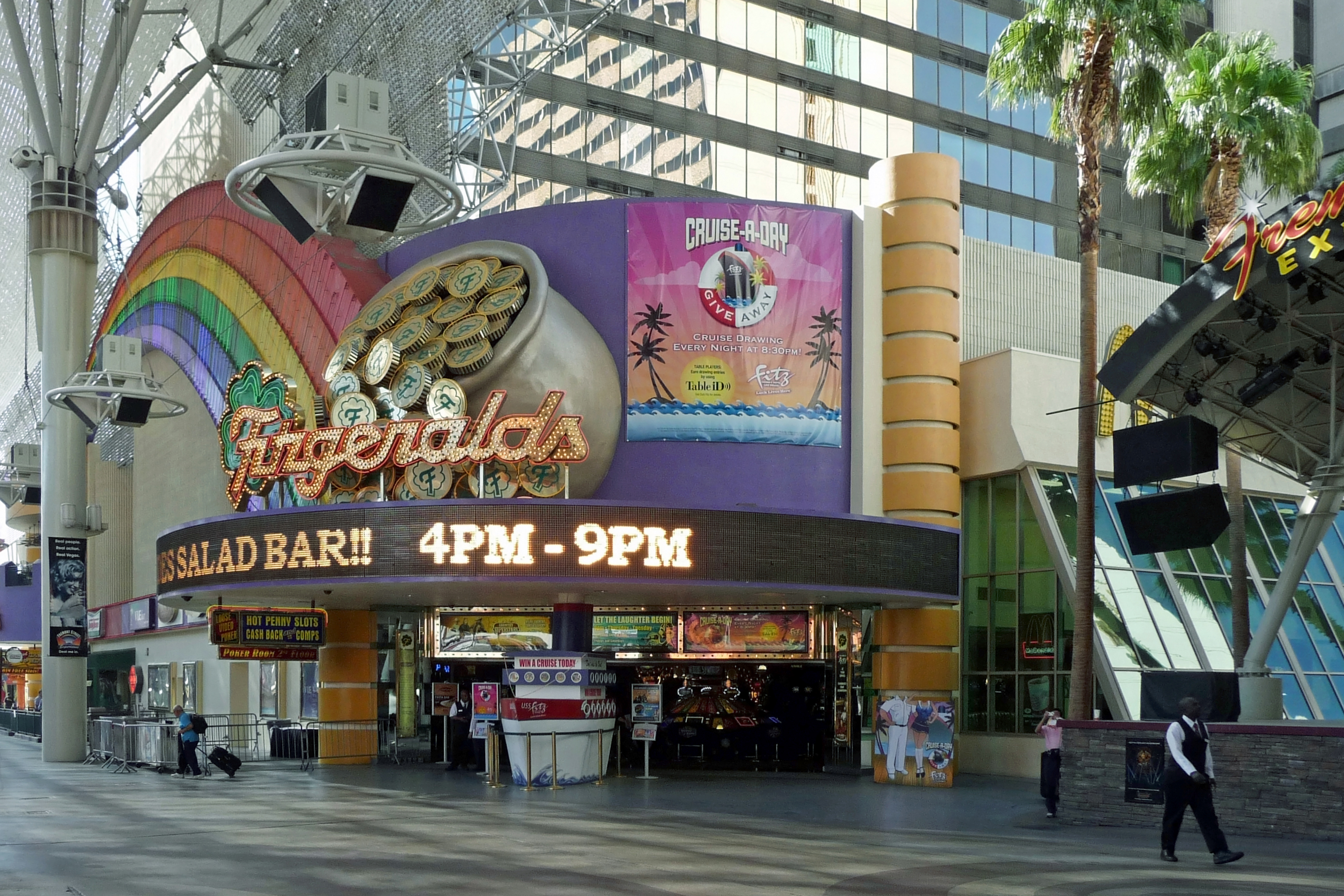
Former casino façade under the Fitzgeralds name.

Finally, in 1987, the Sundance was sold to Lincoln Management Group (later Fitzgeralds Gaming) and renamed as Fitzgeralds Las Vegas.

In December 2001, with Fitzgeralds Gaming in bankruptcy, The Majestic Star Casino, LLC, owned by Don Barden, bought the property, along with two other Fitzgeralds casinos in Colorado and Mississippi, for a total of $149 million. At that point, Barden became the first African American casino owner in Las Vegas. Barden separated Fitzgeralds Las Vegas from the Majestic Star umbrella two years later, to free it from restrictions imposed by the company's lenders.

Barden began a multimillion-dollar renovation of the property, including the buffet, steakhouse, and showroom. New exterior paint was also applied. The renovations were successful and resulted in increased customer visitation. In February 2006, Barden announced that a nearby office building had been purchased for relocation of his company, Barden Nevada Gaming, which had been operating on the 12th floor of Fitzgeralds. The move would free up space in Fitzgeralds that could be redeveloped.

In May 2008, it was reported that Barden was pledging the property to generate a $35-million equity stake in a slots-only casino in Pittsburgh, making a sale likely for Fitzgeralds Las Vegas. It was subsequently reported, however, that Barden had no need to sell Fitzgeralds to maintain a stake in the slots-only casino in Pittsburgh and that it would remain an asset which he could use to generate cash for his struggling gambling portfolio.

In October 2011, several months after Barden's death, his estate sold Fitzgeralds to brothers Derek and Greg Stevens, majority owners of the Golden Gate casino. Derek took a 78% ownership share, with 22% for Greg.

=== The D Las Vegas (2012–present) ===
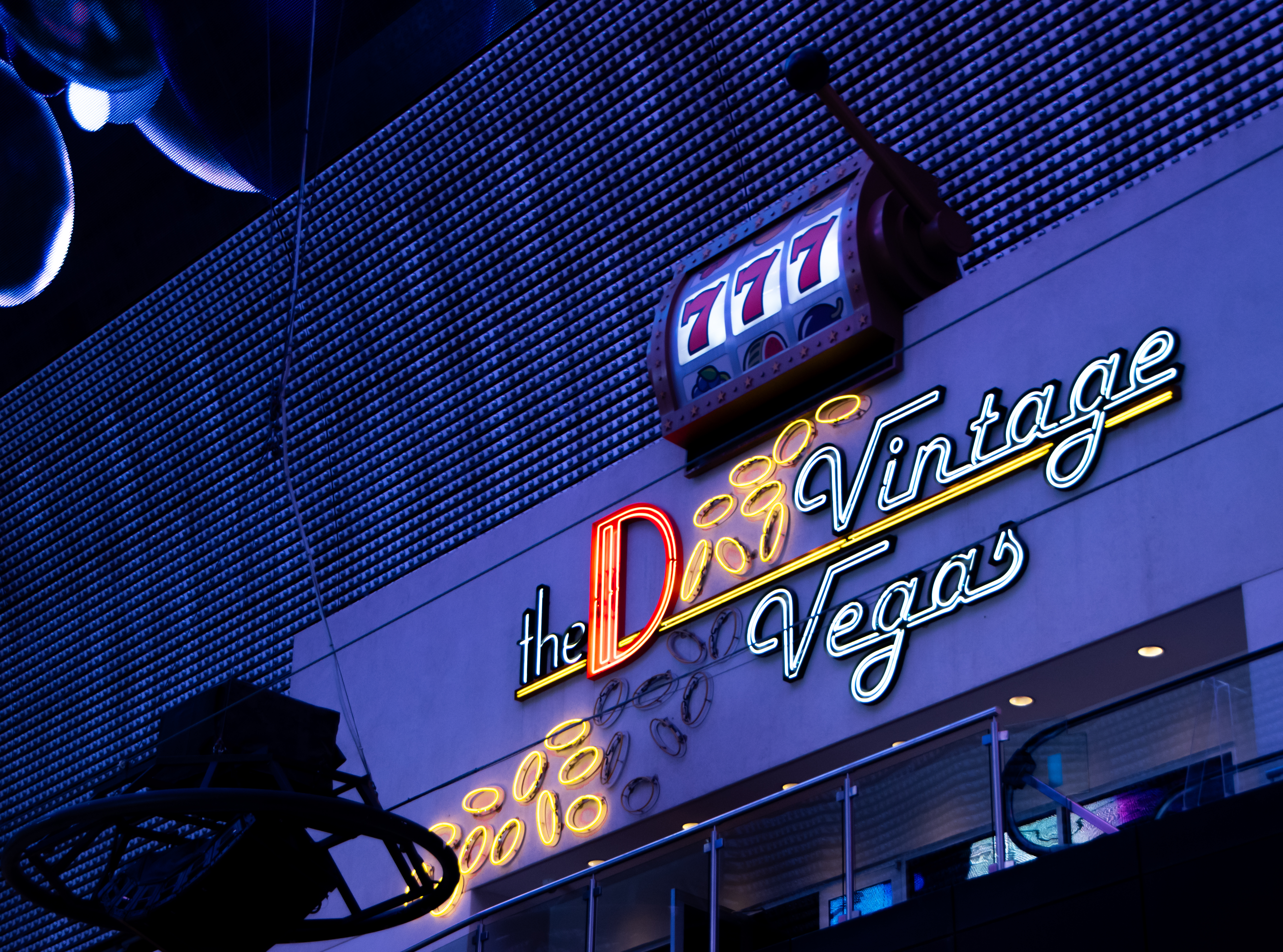
"Vintage Vegas" themed sign in the Fremont Street Experience

The new owners completed a $22 million renovation and rebranding to become the D Las Vegas in Fall 2012. The letter D stands for "downtown", and also refers to Derek Stevens' nickname, and the Stevens' hometown of Detroit. The remodel gave the property a more modern feel, including the addition of dancing dealers in table games. The second-floor casino has a "Vintage Vegas" theme featuring the only operational Sigma Derby game in Las Vegas.

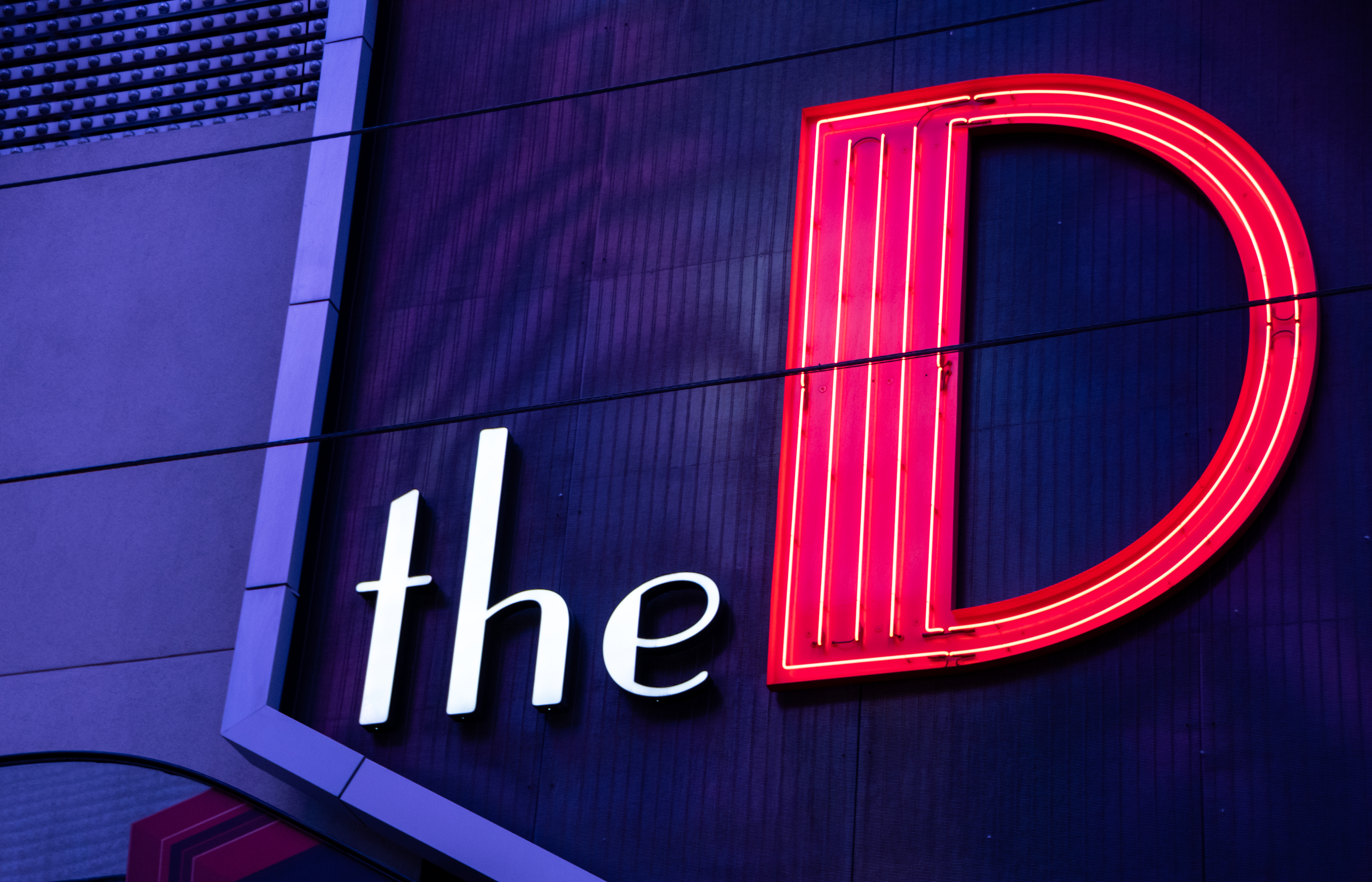
Main sign in the Fremont Street Experience

The multimillion-dollar renovation upgraded all of the guest rooms and created luxury suites. The D also added a fine Italian steakhouse, Joe Vicari's Andiamo Italian Steakhouse, and opened the first American Coney Island outside of Michigan on the building's Fremont Street frontage. The property also features three distinct bars: Longbar, said to be the longest bar in Nevada at just fewer than 100 feet long; D Bar – a permanent outdoor bar on Fremont Street Experience featuring flair bartenders as well as dancing bartenders; and Vue Bar inside the second floor casino. The property's Fremont Street façade was enhanced with the addition of an exterior escalator and interactive video exhibition created by former Cirque du Soleil producer Roger Parent, which together feature more than 40 giant flat-screen monitors combined with hundreds of feet of LED signage. Parent is also responsible for the casino's interior escalator which uses LED technology and music depicting vintage imagery to transport guests to the vintage second-floor casino.

In late 2013, the D became the first casino in the world to accept bitcoin for hotel rooms, restaurants, and gift shop items. Additionally, a bitcoin ATM was installed next to the gaming floor where customers can buy and sell bitcoin instantly for cash.

In February 2017, The D added an exterior video wall promoted as the "World's Largest Keno Board", displaying a live feed of keno numbers as they are drawn inside the casino.

A new 2,000 square foot sports bar and sportsbook known as BarCanada opened on March 13, 2020; replacing the previous showroom on the second floor, it is themed after Canadian culture and hockey, and features Circa Sports terminals and a Vegas Stats & Information Network (VSiN) studio. Its opening was originally intended to coincide with the 2020 NCAA men's basketball tournament, although that event and a formal grand opening ceremony with Stevens and Brent Musburger was cancelled due to the COVID-19 pandemic.
