= Circa Resort & Casino =

Resort and casino in downtown Las Vegas

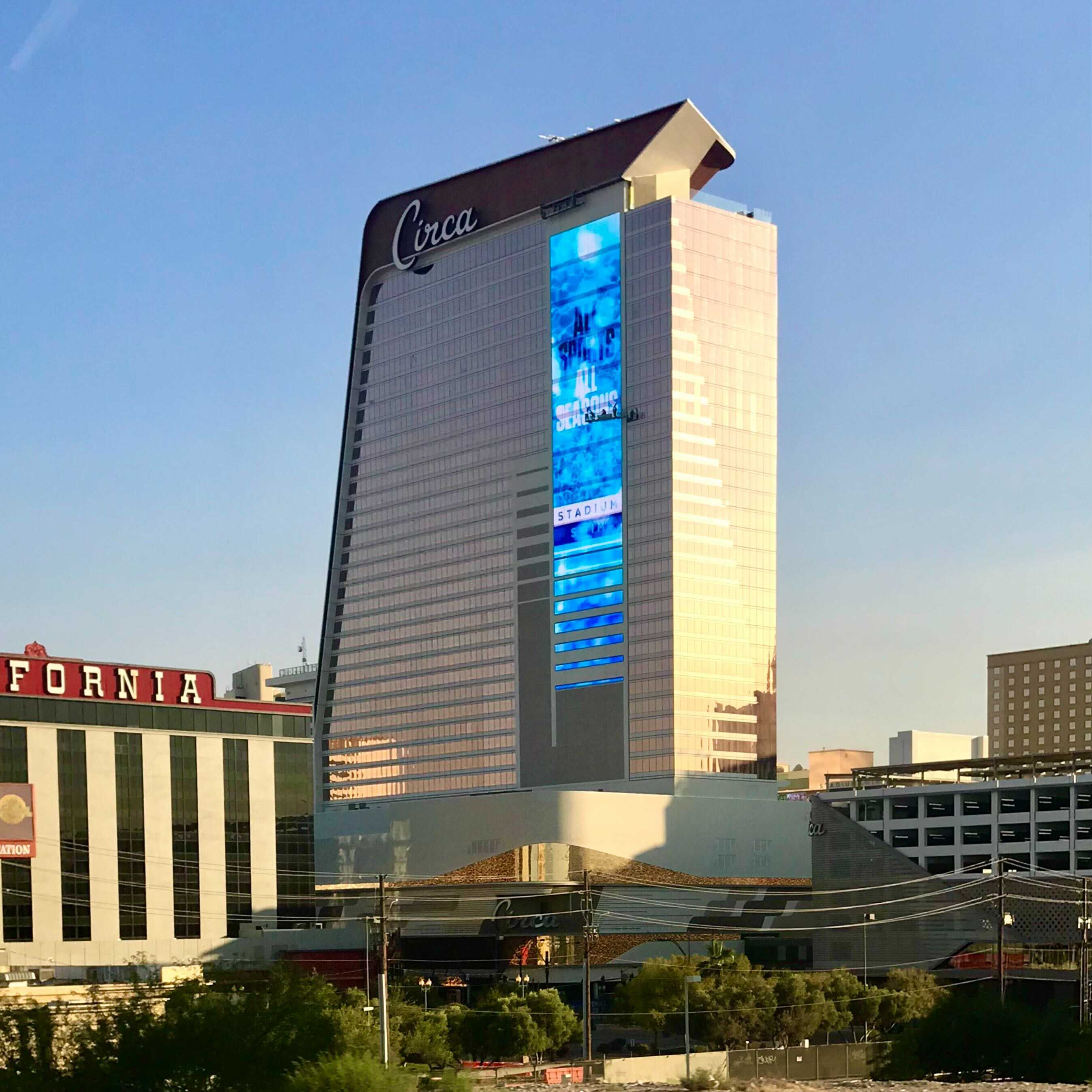
- Circa Resort & Casino, October 2020
- Interactive map of Circa Resort & Casino
- Location: Las Vegas, Nevada 89101; 8 Fremont Street; 36°10′18″N 115°8′44″W
- Opened: October 28, 2020; 5 years ago (casino and amenities); December 28, 2020; 5 years ago (hotel)
- No. of rooms: 618
- Gaming space: 8,002 sq ft (743.4 m^{2})
- Signature attractions: Stadium Swim; Sportsbook; Garage Mahal
- Notable restaurants: Barry's Downtown Prime; Sagainaw's Delicatessen; Victory Burger; 8 East; Project BBQ
- Casino type: Land-based
- Owner: Derek Stevens; Greg Stevens
- Architect: Steelman Partners
- Website: www.circalasvegas.com

Circa Resort & Casino is a casino and hotel resort in downtown Las Vegas, Nevada, on the Fremont Street Experience. The property was previously occupied by the Las Vegas Club hotel-casino, the Mermaids Casino, and the Glitter Gulch strip club. Circa is owned by brothers Derek and Greg Stevens, who also own other downtown casinos. They purchased the Las Vegas Club in 2015, followed by the acquisition of Mermaids and Glitter Gulch. The three businesses were demolished in 2017, and construction on Circa began in February 2019, with an opening initially scheduled for December 2020.

When the COVID-19 pandemic began, new safety precautions were put in place and the project faced disruptions in its supply chain, both causing an alteration in the construction schedule. As a result, construction on the first five floors was expedited for an early opening on October 28, 2020. This included a two-story casino, a three-story sportsbook by Circa Sports, five restaurants, and a six-tiered swimming pool area. The hotel portion opened on December 28, 2020, with 512 rooms. A hotel expansion took place four years later, increasing the room count to 618. Circa is the tallest building in the Fremont Street area, and the first new hotel-casino to be built there since 1980.

== History ==
In August 2015, brothers Derek and Greg Stevens purchased the Las Vegas Club, located at 18 Fremont Street in downtown Las Vegas. The Stevens also owned the nearby Golden Gate Hotel and Casino and The D Las Vegas. They closed the Las Vegas Club in August 2015. Derek Stevens initially considered renovating the Las Vegas Club, but he disliked its design and decided to demolish it entirely to build a new resort in its place.

In 2016, the Stevens purchased the nearby Mermaids Casino and the Glitter Gulch strip club. The additional property opened new possibilities for a larger version of the Stevens' upcoming resort, and the brothers took additional time to determine specifics about the new project. Mermaids and Glitter Gulch closed later in 2016, with plans to demolish them to make more room for the new resort. That year, Derek Stevens also purchased a 2-acre site across the street from the Las Vegas Club, between the Plaza Hotel & Casino and the Main Street Station. The property would become the site of the new resort's eventual parking garage, known as the Garage Mahal. The Las Vegas Club, Mermaids, and Glitter Gulch were demolished in 2017.

Derek Stevens had initially planned to build a resort on the site called Lucky Line, designed by Paul Steelman. It would have been a 500-foot skyscraper with an observation deck and rooftop restaurant, similar to the nearby Strat tower. The new resort project was once referred to as "18 Fremont" because of its address, although the final street address of the resort is 8 Fremont Street. By May 2018, the project was planned to include a 459-foot-tall hotel, making it among the tallest buildings in downtown Las Vegas. This raised FAA concerns about height and airspace due to the project's proximity with the North Las Vegas Airport. The new resort, with a height of 459 feet, was approved by the Las Vegas City Council in July 2018.

On January 10, 2019, the resort's name was unveiled as Circa Resort & Casino, during a party at the Downtown Las Vegas Events Center. The name is a homage to the history of Las Vegas, including past casino builders such as Benny Binion, Jackie Gaughan, Jay Sarno, and Sam Boyd. A video montage explained the resort's name, listing examples of earlier well known Las Vegas properties and their establishment dates and founders, such as, "Circa 1941, Jackie Gaughan, El Cortez. Circa 1951, Benny Binion, Binion's Horseshoe. Circa 1966, Jay Sarno, Caesars Palace. Circa 1969, Kirk Kerkorian, International." The video further stated that the announcement of Circa's name would one day be referred to as, "Circa January 2019". Other names were considered, including Overland, which was the original name of the Las Vegas Club; and The Mint, which was the name of a former property adjacent to the Las Vegas Club. Circa was scheduled to open in December 2020. Derek Stevens intended for the resort to be opened prior to 2021 for tax advantages.

=== Construction ===
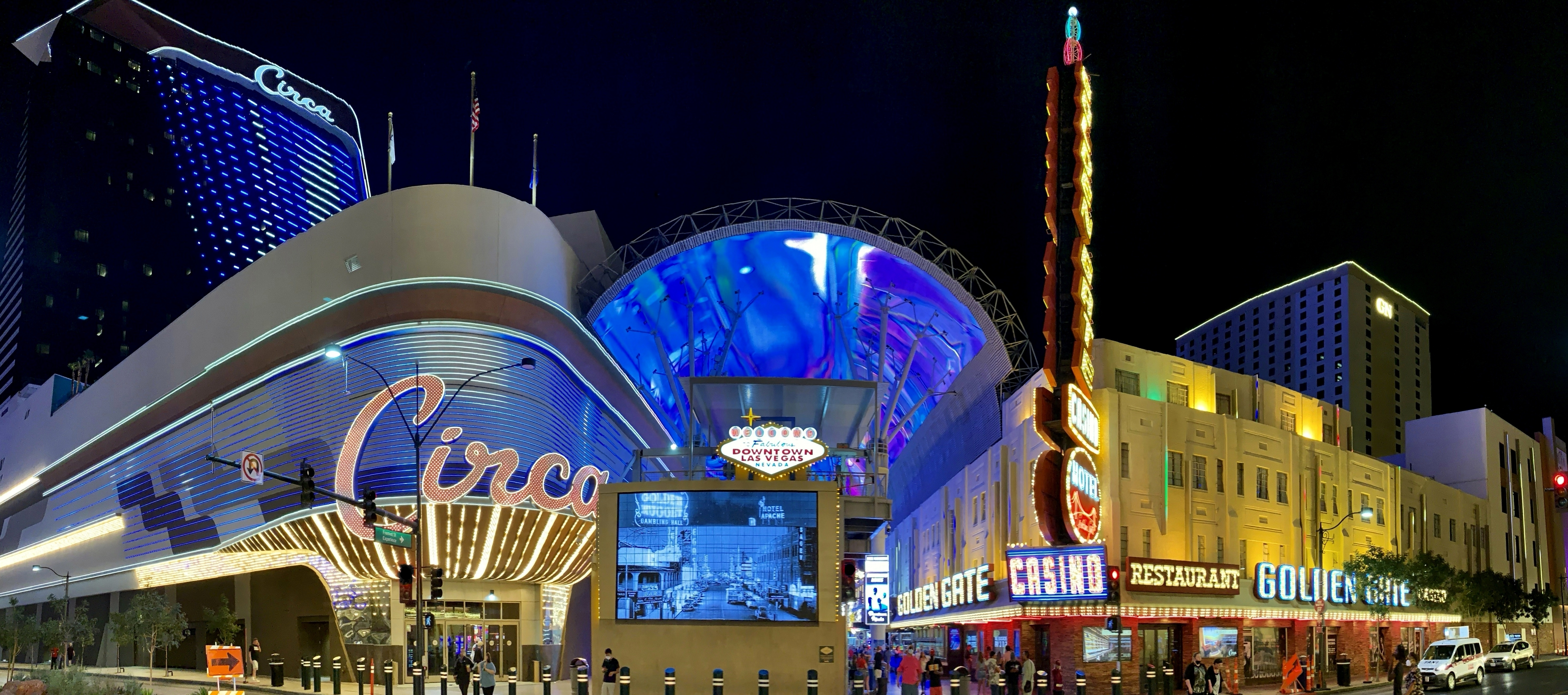
Circa Resort & Casino and the Golden Gate Hotel and Casino at the western end of the Fremont Street Experience

Circa was designed by Steelman Partners. The construction manager was Tré Builders, while McCarthy Building Companies Inc. was the general contractor. Construction began in February 2019. The tight size of the property meant that only three days' worth of materials could be delivered at a time. Parts of the resort were prefabricated off-site and then transported to the construction site for integration into the resort. A concrete pour took place in April 2019, with an estimated 2,100 cubic yards (1,600 m^{3}) of concrete. As of June 2019, there were nearly 600 construction workers on the project, including approximately 200 workers on the main property and approximately 40 workers on Garage Mahal. Construction progressed with a continuous schedule. The 1.25-million sq ft (116,000 m^{2}) project began vertical construction that month. The resort's HVAC system was built to dispense air from the floor rather than the ceiling, eliminating a common problem with cigarette smoke lingering on casino floors.

Beginning in October 2019, the project had approximately 1,000 construction workers. Three months later, construction reached the 23rd floor. The COVID-19 pandemic occurred during construction, having various effects in Nevada. A Circa construction worker tested positive for COVID-19 in April 2020. Social distancing had been implemented as a safety precaution for COVID-19, and this meant that fewer workers were allowed to work on the upper floors. The construction elevator, normally capable of holding 15 workers, had its capacity reduced to less than five as a pandemic safety measure. The project also faced disruptions in its construction supply chain, another result of the pandemic. Rather than finish the entire resort before opening, the Stevens agreed to a new proposal from the construction team to expedite work on the first five floors, including the casino and pool. The lower floors provided wide-open spaces for social distancing and they were more easily accessible than the upper floors.

The Circa hotel tower was topped out on June 19, 2020. The tower includes 175,000 sq ft (16,300 m^{2}) of glass paneling. The tower's north side features a giant video screen which promotes the resort. It was built by Daktronics, and measures 228 feet tall and 52 feet wide. During construction, a minor error occurred on the west side of the tower's 30th-floor exterior. Mo Pierce, one of the project engineers, installed a white-colored glass panel in the wrong spot, making it stand out from the rest of the paneling. By mid-2020, the mistake had gained an online following, and Derek Stevens said the misplaced panel was nicknamed as the "MoDot" and was used as a reference point: "(We'd say) plumbing is going on three floors below the MoDot, we're doing this above the MoDot. It became a noun, it became part of our regular vocabulary." The MoDot was eventually removed, a few days after the resort's opening. Circa was the first new hotel-casino to be built in downtown's Fremont Street area since the D Las Vegas, which originally opened as the Sundance in 1980.

=== Opening & early years ===
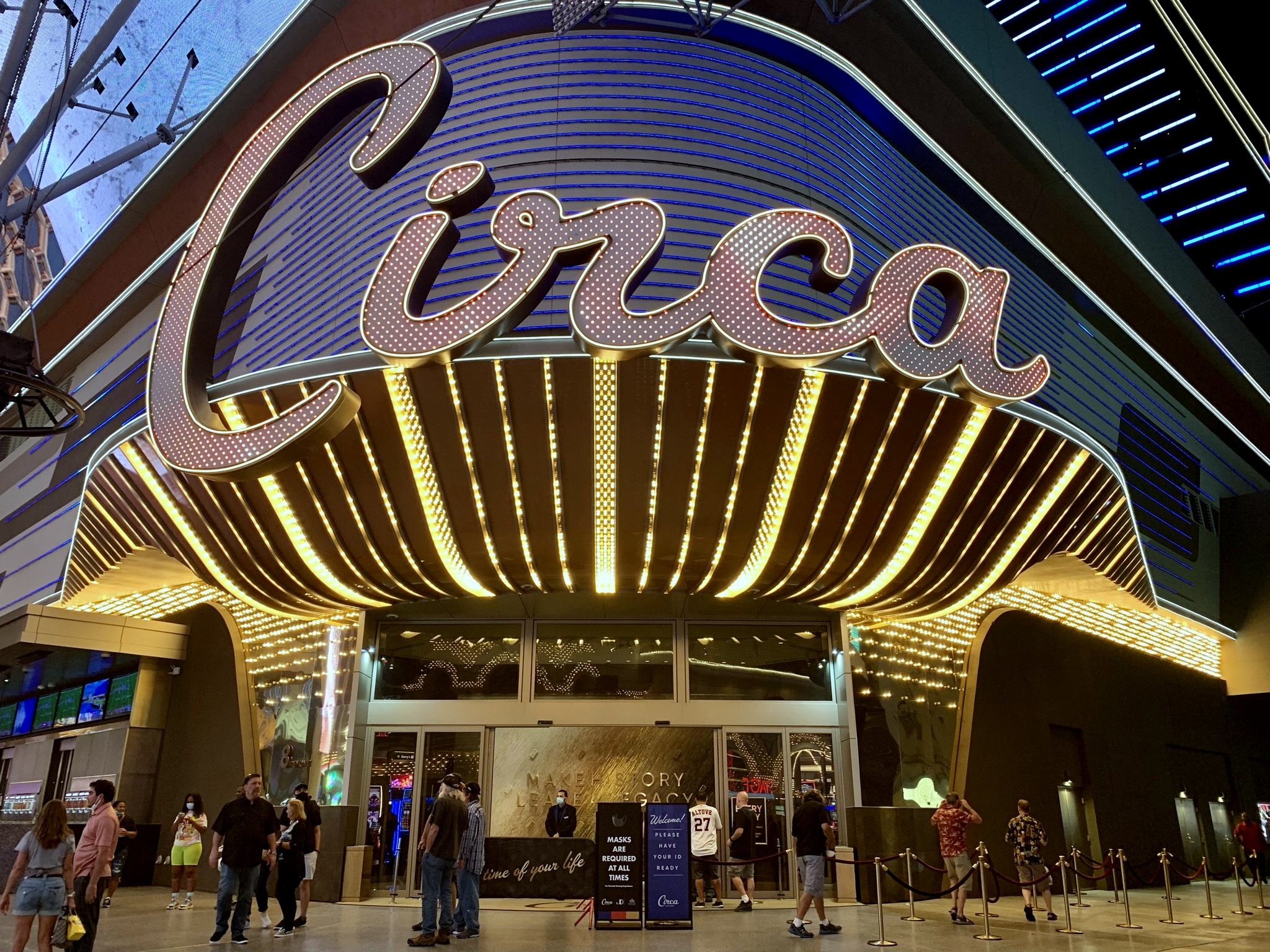
Circa entrance on the Fremont Street Experience in 2021

In June 2020, plans were announced to open the first five floors early, on October 28, while the hotel portion would open two months later. Derek Stevens also announced that Circa will be an adult-only property, stating that Las Vegas once held "a certain mystique as this fabulous place where only grown-ups could play. Call us old-fashioned, but we think adults need some of that mystique back in their lives."

Circa hosted a VIP party for select guests on the night of October 27, 2020, followed by the public opening at 12:01 a.m. the next day. The opening included the casino, restaurants, and pool area. Although the hotel's official opening took place on December 28, 2020, hotel guests who booked for the opening day had the ability to check in two days early. Derek Stevens billed it as the world's earliest check-in. A total of 165 hotel guests participated in the early opening.

The hotel opened initially with 512 rooms, excluding the seven top floors. Stevens said that waiting to finish the upper floors would allow time to determine what type of rooms each floor should have: standard rooms or suites. In October 2024, the hotel opened four of these floors with an additional 106 rooms, including 4 suites, for a new total of 618 units.

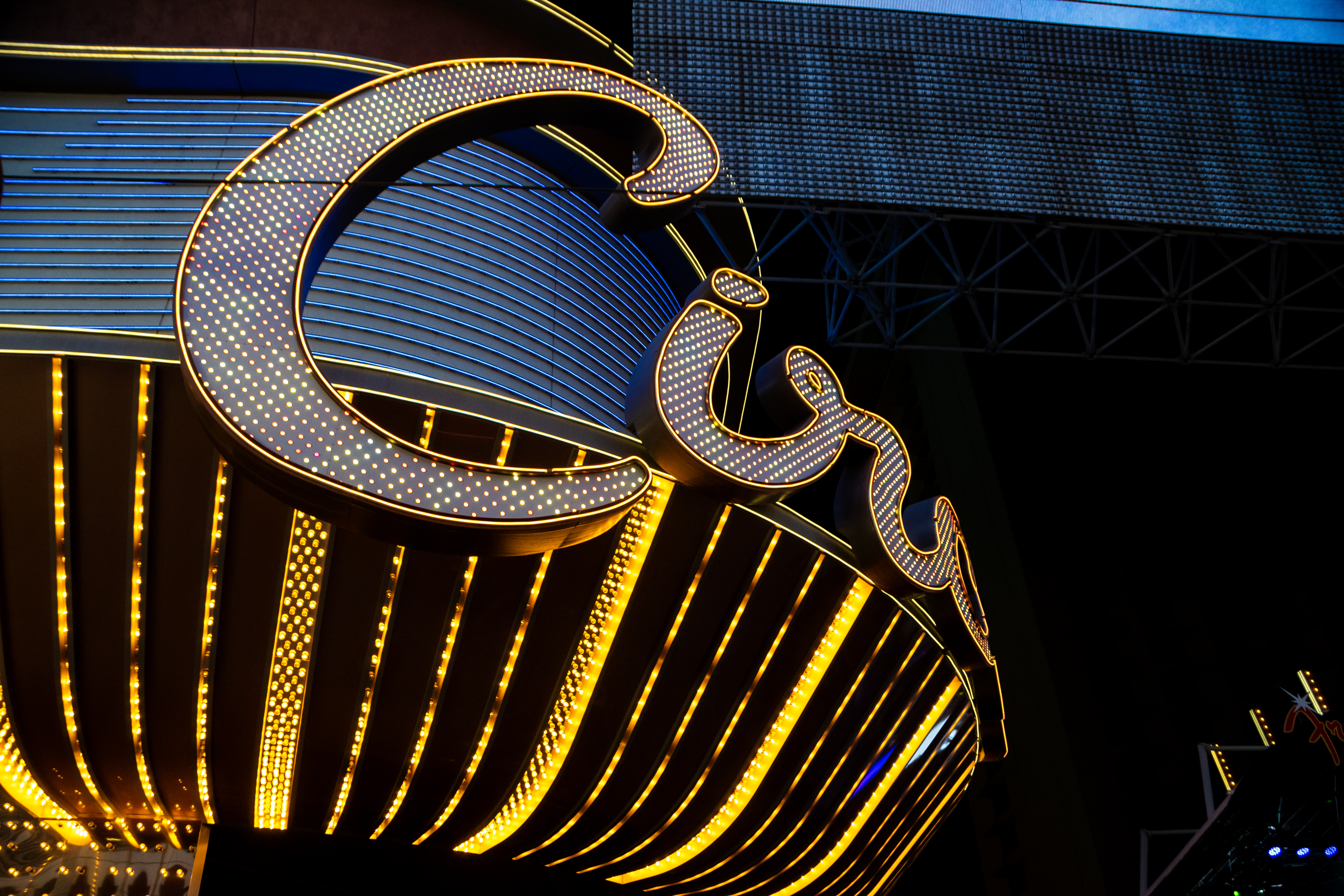
Main sign on the Fremont Street Experience in 2025

Circa is the first new hotel-casino to open in the Las Vegas Valley since the Lucky Dragon in 2016. The resort has 1,500 employees, helping the city amid high unemployment rates caused by the pandemic. Circa is expected to help bring tourism back to the downtown area, away from the Las Vegas Strip. As of 2021, Circa is the only property in the downtown area to have an AAA Four Diamond rating. That year, it also won for best North American gaming property from Global Gaming Awards Las Vegas.

On January 24, 2025, Circa hosted President Donald Trump, who gave a speech at the hotel that evening.

==== Circa 2 proposal ====
Owner Derek Stevens plans to build a second resort in Downtown Las Vegas, tentatively called Circa 2 . It would be built at Symphony Park, a mixed-use development. The resort will be adjacent to Circa’s current parking garage and two blocks from Circa. The new property will be built on 6.42 acres at the northeast corner of Symphony Park.

== Features ==
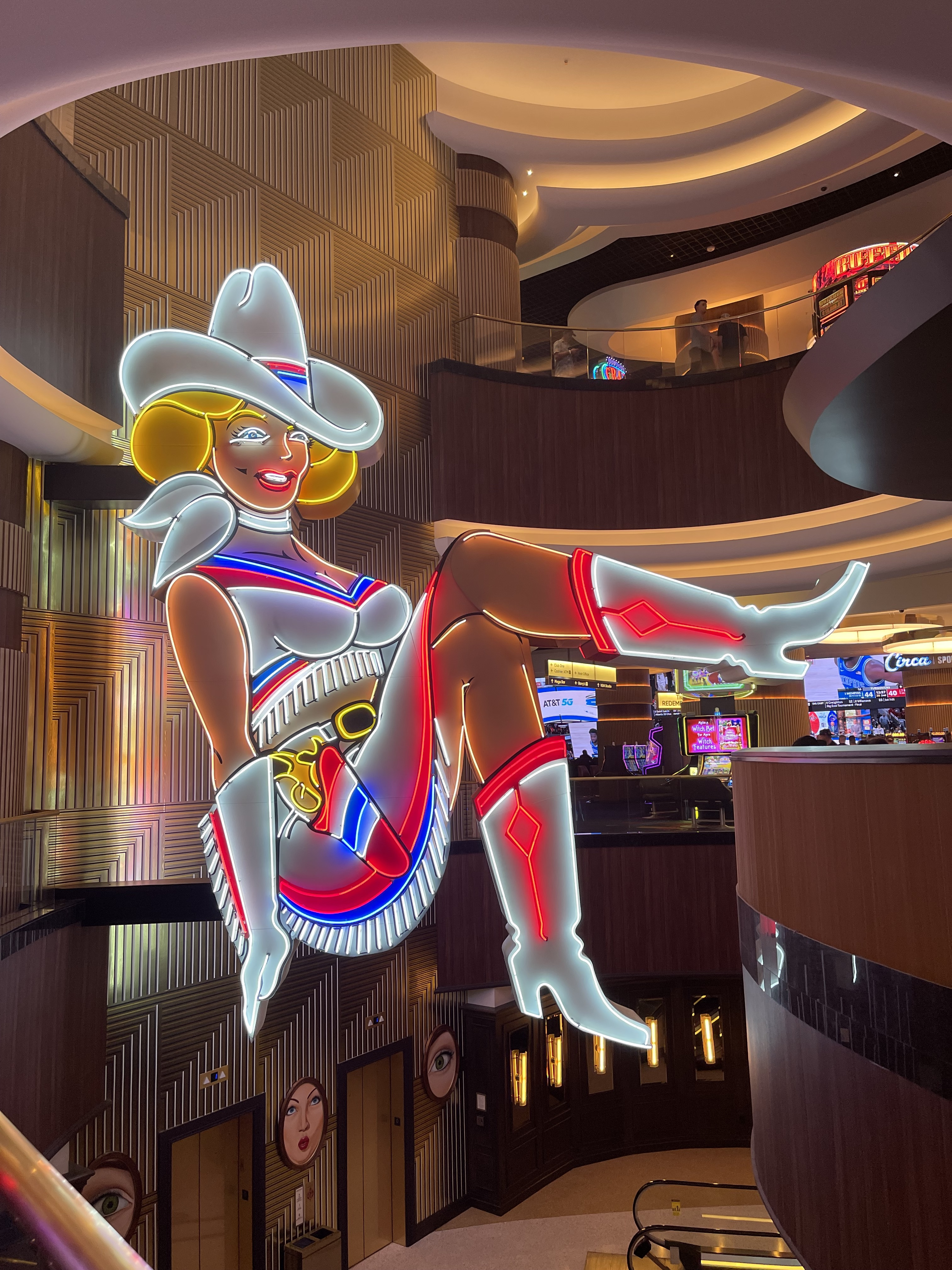
Vegas Vickie sign at Circa

Circa is located on 2.78 acres. It has 35 floors and rises 480 feet. It is among the tallest buildings in Las Vegas city limits. (Note: Other tall structures include the Strat tower and Allure Las Vegas.) The hotel has 26 room types, ranging from 980 to 1,830 square feet. Circa includes technological features, such as a tablet computer that allows hotel guests to control lighting and temperature, or to request housekeeping. Using an interactive online map, customers can also pay to reserve certain seating at restaurants, the pool, or the sportsbook.

The resort's design includes references to past and modern Las Vegas history. Various forms of artwork, including murals, are featured throughout Circa. The resort's lobby incorporates the former Vegas Vickie cowgirl sign that once advertised Glitter Gulch.

Circa's nine-story parking garage, known as Garage Mahal, is located across the street from the resort. It contains 982 parking spaces, artwork, a 22-foot chandelier, and an air-conditioned skybridge connecting it to the Circa resort.

In September 2022, the resort is scheduled to open 35,000 sq ft (3,300 m^{2}) of convention and meeting space on its third floor.

=== Bars and lounges ===
Circa has six bars and lounges, including an 8,400 sq ft (780 m^{2}) rooftop lounge known as the Legacy Club, which honors prominent Las Vegas figures. It includes busts of 11 prominent figures, and a display of 500 gold bars. The lounge also has views of the Las Vegas Valley and includes patio seating.

A cocktail lounge known as Vegas Vickie's is located in the hotel lobby and contains the eponymous sign. Circa also has the longest outdoor bar on the Fremont Street Experience, and the state's longest indoor bar, known as the Mega Bar. It is a sister to the Longbar at the D Las Vegas, breaking its record for Nevada's longest indoor bar at 165 feet. Overhang Bar, located on the top floor of the sportsbook, is an homage to the right-field overhang in the original Tiger Stadium, located in Stevens' hometown of Detroit.

=== Gaming ===
Circa includes a two-story casino, measuring 8,002 sq ft (743.4 m^{2}), with 1,350 slot machines and 49 table games.

Circa will heavily focus on sports betting. Its three-story, stadium-style sportsbook was planned as the biggest in Las Vegas and is a prime aspect of the resort, unlike other newer resorts in Las Vegas that place less emphasis on sportsbooks. The book is operated by Circa Sports, and is the company's flagship location, with seating for 1,000 people. It includes a three-story, high-definition 78 megapixel television screen, built at a cost of approximately $20 million. Up to 10 people are required to operate the screen. Derek Stevens said that the sportsbook would be the largest in the world, beating out the 30,000 sq ft (2,800 m^{2}) SuperBook at the Westgate Las Vegas.

Stevens' vision for the sportsbook was inspired by his initial visits to the books at Caesars Palace and the Hilton (now the Westgate), both of which he considered impressive. The sportsbook includes a broadcasting studio for the Vegas Stats & Information Network (VSiN). Circa set out to become a center of sports wagering in downtown Las Vegas and keep building upon Circa Sports' reputation for allowing sharp bettors.

Circa Sports has shaped its reputation in the sports betting world through high-stakes NFL-centered contests. The Circa Sports Million pro football contest began in 2019. At that time, Circa Sports was found in the Golden Gate Casino and the D Hotel. In 2021, Circa Sports launched the Circa Survivor contest with a $1000 entry fee, a $6 million guaranteed payout, and no rake. By this time Circa Sports had a home in the new Circa Resort & Casino. In 2025, Circa Sports launched Circa Grandissimo, similar in format to Circa Survivor but with $100000 entry fee. All three of these contests are still going as of 2026 and draw players from across the country.

=== Stadium Swim ===
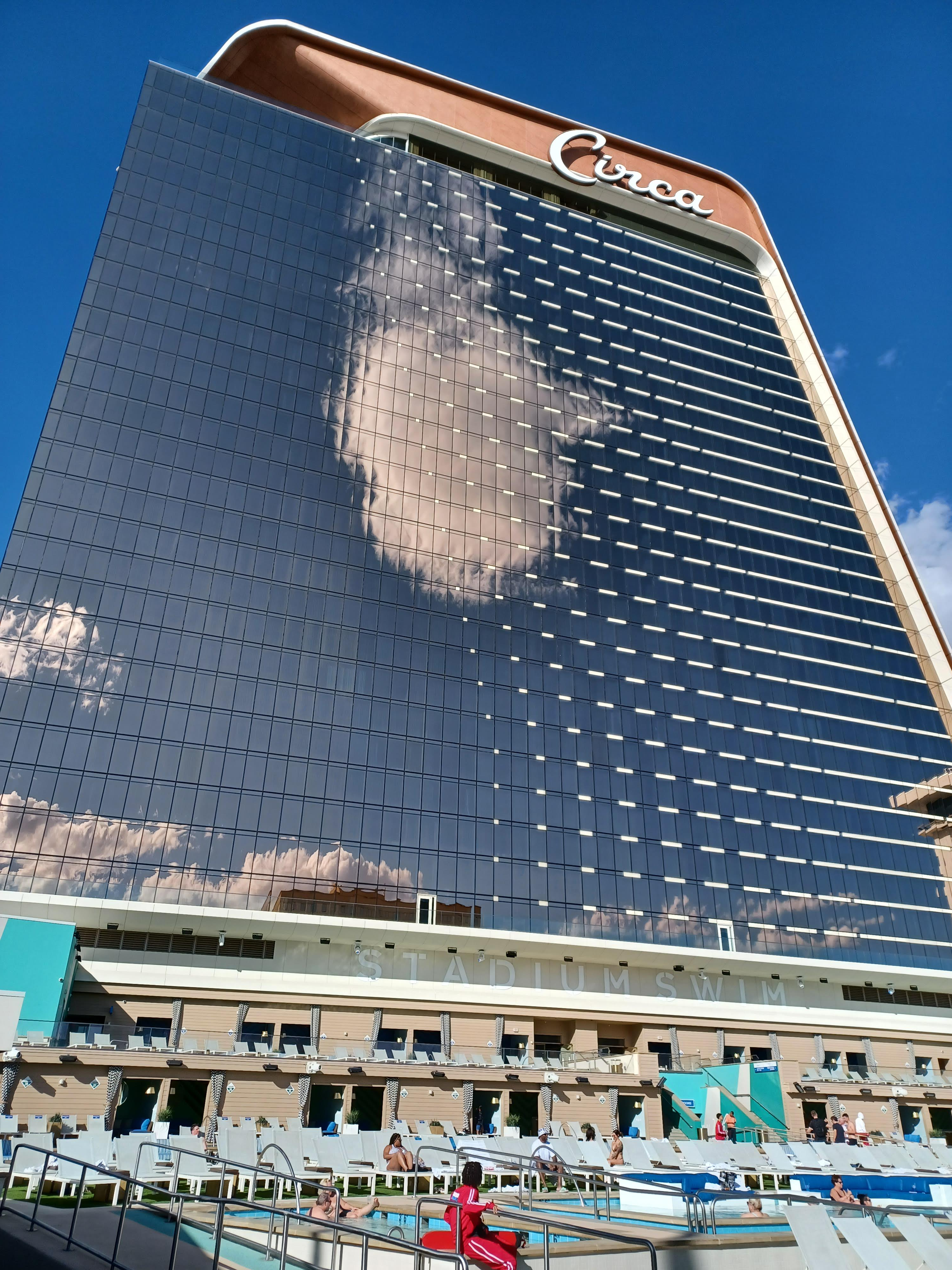
Stadium Swim, located beside the hotel tower

Circa's rooftop pool area is known as Stadium Swim, and is located above the casino. Stadium Swim includes six pools and measures 15,756 sq ft (1,463.8 m^{2}), with capacity for 4,000 people. It includes a six-tiered pool area with a 143-foot screen made of 14 megapixels, as well as a DJ booth and two swim-up bars. Sporting events will be primarily shown on the pool's television screen. The pool is temperature-controlled, allowing it to remain open year-round. Derek Stevens expects the pool to become a top tourist destination, and he envisions the pool as becoming the greatest in the history of the world. A three-story escalator, the tallest in Las Vegas, transports people to Stadium Swim. The pool area has become a popular location for parties.

=== Restaurants ===
Circa has several restaurants, including some operated by people from the Stevens' home state of Michigan. Those restaurants include:

- 8 East, an Asian restaurant serving Chinese, Japanese, Korean, Thai, and Vietnamese food.
- Barry's Downtown Prime, a steakhouse and seafood restaurant by chef Barry Dakake, with an atmospheric setting of 1950s and 1960s Las Vegas. It is Circa's largest restaurant, with seating for 350. It is the only part of the resort to allow people under the age of 21.
- Project BBQ, an outdoor barbeque restaurant with a food truck façade, located along the Fremont Street Experience.
- Saginaw's Delicatessen, serving breakfast specialties and delicatessen options. During certain hours, it offers 99-cent shrimp cocktails, a popular local item that had been introduced by the Golden Gate casino in the 1950s.
- Victory Burger & Wings Co., a burger and chicken wing restaurant overlooking the sportsbook.
