= Golden Gate Hotel and Casino =

Casino hotel in Nevada, United States

Coordinates: 36°10′17″N 115°08′47″W

Golden Gate Hotel & Casino

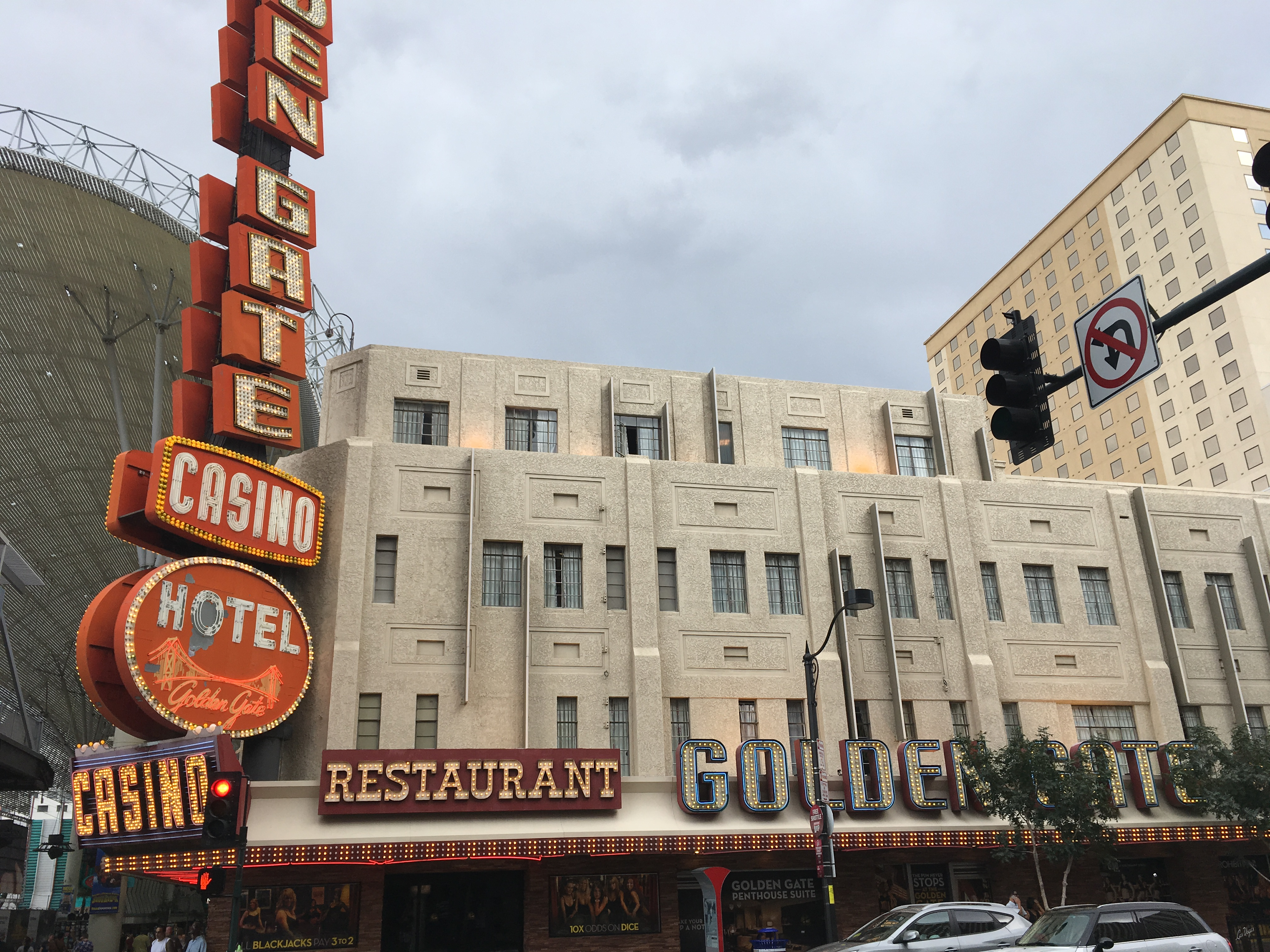
- Interactive map of Golden Gate Hotel & Casino
- Location: Las Vegas, Nevada 89101; 1 Fremont Street
- Opened: January 13, 1906; 120 years ago
- Theme: 1930s San Francisco
- No. of rooms: 106
- Gaming space: 12,243 sq ft (1,137.4 m^{2})
- Signature attractions: Shrimp cocktail
- Casino type: Land-based
- Owner: Derek Stevens; Greg Stevens
- Previous names: Hotel Nevada; Sal Sagev
- Renovated in: 1906, 1931, 1955, 1964, 2005, 2012, 2017
- Website: Golden Gate Hotel & Casino

The Golden Gate Hotel & Casino is located at One Fremont Street in Las Vegas, Nevada, United States. It is the oldest and smallest hotel (122 rooms) included in the Fremont Street Experience, and is the first downtown casino to transition to all-electronic games in the city.

John F. Miller initially opened a temporary tent hotel – the Miller Hotel – on the property in 1905, while he planned to construct Hotel Nevada, a permanent hotel structure. The first record of Hotel Nevada being open is a blurb in Las Vegas Age on January 13, 1906. A casino operated within the hotel until a statewide gambling ban took effect in 1909. In 1931, the property was expanded and renamed as Sal Sagev ("Las Vegas" spelled backwards). In 1955, Golden Gate Casino, a separate business, opened on the ground floor of the hotel. The entire property was renamed as the Golden Gate Hotel and Casino in 1974 after the casino bought the hotel. It has been a consistently operating hotel and casino since 1955.

== History ==
=== Early history (1905 – 1974) ===
John F. Miller was among the first to come to Las Vegas in 1905. An auction for property in the city's future downtown area was held in May 1905. Miller purchased a $1,750 parcel at the southeast corner of Main Street and Fremont Street. On the property shortly thereafter, he established the Miller Hotel, a temporary tent hotel that was also known as the Hotel Nevada.

In August 1905, Miller had plans to construct a permanent two-story hotel structure on the property. Construction on the new hotel was to begin as soon as the Kuhn Mercantile Company could vacate the property. In September 1905, the Miller Hotel became the first lodging establishment in Las Vegas to receive plumbing. In December 1905, plans were underway for a two-story retail and apartment building, to be constructed adjacent to the Hotel Nevada. The front of the new building was to be cemented to blend in with the hotel. Miller planned for the hotel to be modern, with amenities that included heating, electricity, and a telephone system.

The two-story Hotel Nevada, located at 1 Fremont Street, opened on January 13, 1906, becoming the first hotel structure in Las Vegas, and the only concrete hotel in southern Nevada. The hotel rooms measured 10 feet square, cost $1 per day, and were referred to by a local newspaper as "first class". Due to the hotel's popularity, Miller announced in June 1906 that he would soon have a third story added to the property, but historic photographs and later newspaper records show that while the hotel was expanded, it did not have a third story until the early 1930s. In October 1906, construction was underway on the addition, which consisted of brick and measured 20 feet by 30 feet. The addition added a kitchen and four bedrooms. In 1907, Las Vegas' first telephone was installed at the Hotel Nevada, with the number 1.

The hotel's casino operated until 1909, when gambling was banned in Nevada. The casino's blackjack and poker tables were subsequently put into storage. By March 1918, Miller was considering a large addition to the hotel that would consist of reinforced concrete and would include 40 feet of frontage along Fremont Street. The hotel gained additional popularity beginning in 1925, when city officials had Fremont Street paved. In 1931, the property was expanded to three and four stories and 106 rooms and in early 1932 was renamed Sal Sagev (Las Vegas spelled backwards), with a Hotel Sal Sagev neon sign added to the building.

In July 1955, Abe Miller – the property's longtime operator and the son of John F. Miller – was approved for plans to lease the Sal Sagev's ground floor to a 22-man group, which would sublease the floor for $25,000 per month to eight Italian-American men, including: Italo Ghelfi, Robert Picardo, Al Durante, Leo Massaro, Dan Fiorito and Tiny Naylor, nearly all of them from Oakland, California. The eight men planned to open the 9,500-square-foot Golden Gate casino on the ground floor of the Sal Sagev. Renovations on the new casino were underway that month and were being financed by the 23-man group, with an estimated cost of $330,000. Abe Miller was to receive $2,300 per month, as well as five percent of the gambling profits. The Golden Gate casino, named after the Golden Gate Bridge, opened on the ground floor later in 1955, while the hotel retained the Sal Sagev name. Italo Ghelfi, one of the casino's 22 original partners, operated the casino for nearly 40 years.

In February 1957, John F. Miller died during a nap at his apartment, located within the Sal Sagev hotel. He was 92 years old, and had experienced a substantial period of declining health. Abe Miller continued to operate the Sal Sagev into the 1960s. In 1964, the hotel was expanded to include a total of 106 rooms. In 1965, the hotel's exterior was covered in aluminum siding, which remained until its removal in 1990. As of 1969, Abe Miller operated the property with his sister, Helen Nugent.

=== Later years (1974 – present) ===
In 1974, the entire property was renamed as the Golden Gate Hotel and Casino. Abe Miller and his sister had died by 1985, and his sister willed her small ownership of the property to nuns at The Convent of the Good Shepherd of Las Vegas. Ghelfi's family purchased the property from the partnership in 1990, and removed the metal-screen façade that had earlier been applied to the structure. The Golden Gate's 90th anniversary was marked by numerous celebrations in late May 1996, including Las Vegas mayor Jan Laverty Jones proclaiming it to be "Las Vegas' Most Historic Hotel."

The 106-room, four-story hotel was renovated in 2005. By that time, the property was managed by Ghelfi's step-son, Mark Brandenburg. Brandenburg later became the owner. In March 2008, Brandenberg sold a 50% interest in the property to Desert Rock Enterprises, the investment company of Derek and Greg Stevens, who also owned the Las Vegas 51s baseball team and a 19% stake in the Riviera casino. With new money infused by the Stevens, the Golden Gate undertook casino upgrades and hotel room renovations. The following year, the Stevens raised their stake to 60%, and Derek took over as CEO, with Brandenburg as president.

In 2010, a Du-par's restaurant opened inside the Golden Gate, replacing the Bay City Diner. Du-par's operated as a leased tenant of the Golden Gate.

In 2012, the Golden Gate began its first major renovation in more than 50 years, gutting the old piano bar area and vintage hotel lobby area in favor of a more open and modern look, including scantily-clad women at the betting tables known as dancing dealers. The $12 million renovation includes a 35,000-square-foot, five-story hotel tower with 14 new suites and two penthouses, a new porte cochere, a new check-in and slot club desks, an expansion of the casino floor and a new high limit gaming area. Greg and Derek Stevens became full owners of Golden Gate in 2016.

On February 7, 2017, the Du-par's restaurant closed due to financial reasons, as it had been struggling with lease payments. It was owned by Biff Naylor, son of one of Golden Gate's original owners, Tiny Naylor.

That month, construction began on an expansion to the Golden Gate's casino. The expansion would take Golden Gate's footprint into the space formerly occupied by the La Bayou casino. The Golden Gate closed around 2:00 a.m. on August 21, 2017, to allow for the multimillion-dollar renovation project, which had been planned for eight months. The project doubled the casino size and added 100 new slot machines. The project also added a new casino entrance, and extended the outdoor OneBar by 20 feet. The renovations occurred at the site of the former La Bayou as well as an alley that once separated the two casinos. The Golden Gate reopened 106 hours later, at 12:00 p.m. on August 25, 2017. The casino contains 12,243 sq ft (1,137.4 m^{2}) of space. A sportsbook was added on June 1, 2019. It is operated by Derek Stevens' company, Circa Sports.

In October 2025, the Golden Gate became the first casino in downtown Las Vegas to eliminate human dealers, switching to all electronic games.

== Shrimp cocktail ==
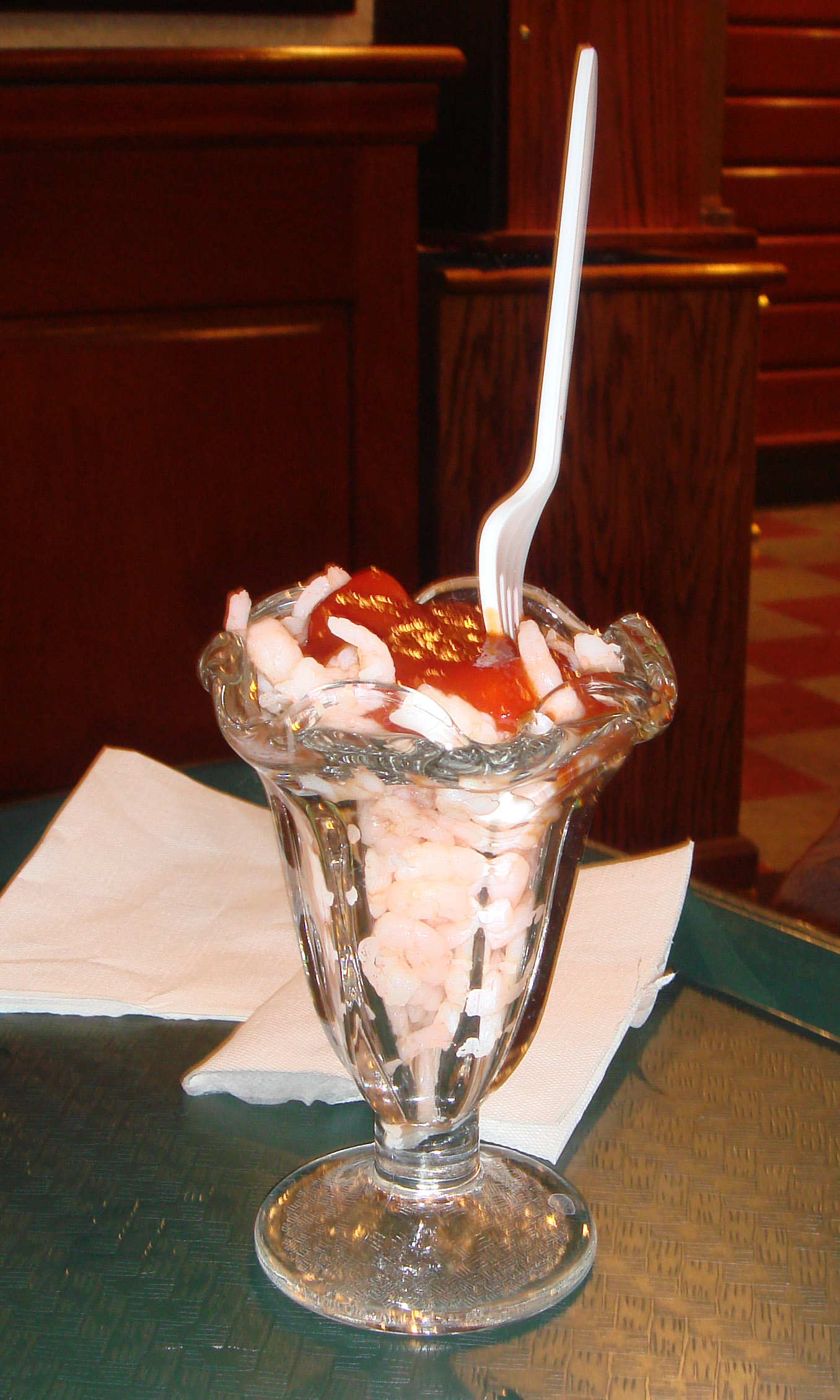
The famed Golden Gate shrimp cocktail as served in 2008.

The Golden Gate was the first to serve a fifty-cent shrimp cocktail in 1959, now a Las Vegas cliché. The idea came from owner Italo Ghelfi, who based it on Fisherman's Wharf in San Francisco.

The Original Shrimp Cocktail consists of a regular-sized sundae glass filled with small salad shrimp and topped with a dollop of cocktail sauce. In 1991, the price was raised from 50¢ to 99¢, as the property was losing $300,000 a year on shrimp cocktails under the previous price. The price was raised in 2008 to $1.99. Until the 2012 renovations, there was a deli bar from which the shrimp cocktails were served. As of October 26, 2012, the price stood at $2.99. As of August 2013, the price was $3.99.

In 2019, with the closure of the privately owned Du-par's restaurant, Golden Gate discontinued serving its shrimp cocktail. Derek Stevens, co-owner of Golden Gate, reintroduced the menu item on a temporary basis in October of that year, and then again in 2020 at the Circa, where he is also co-owner.

== Gallery ==
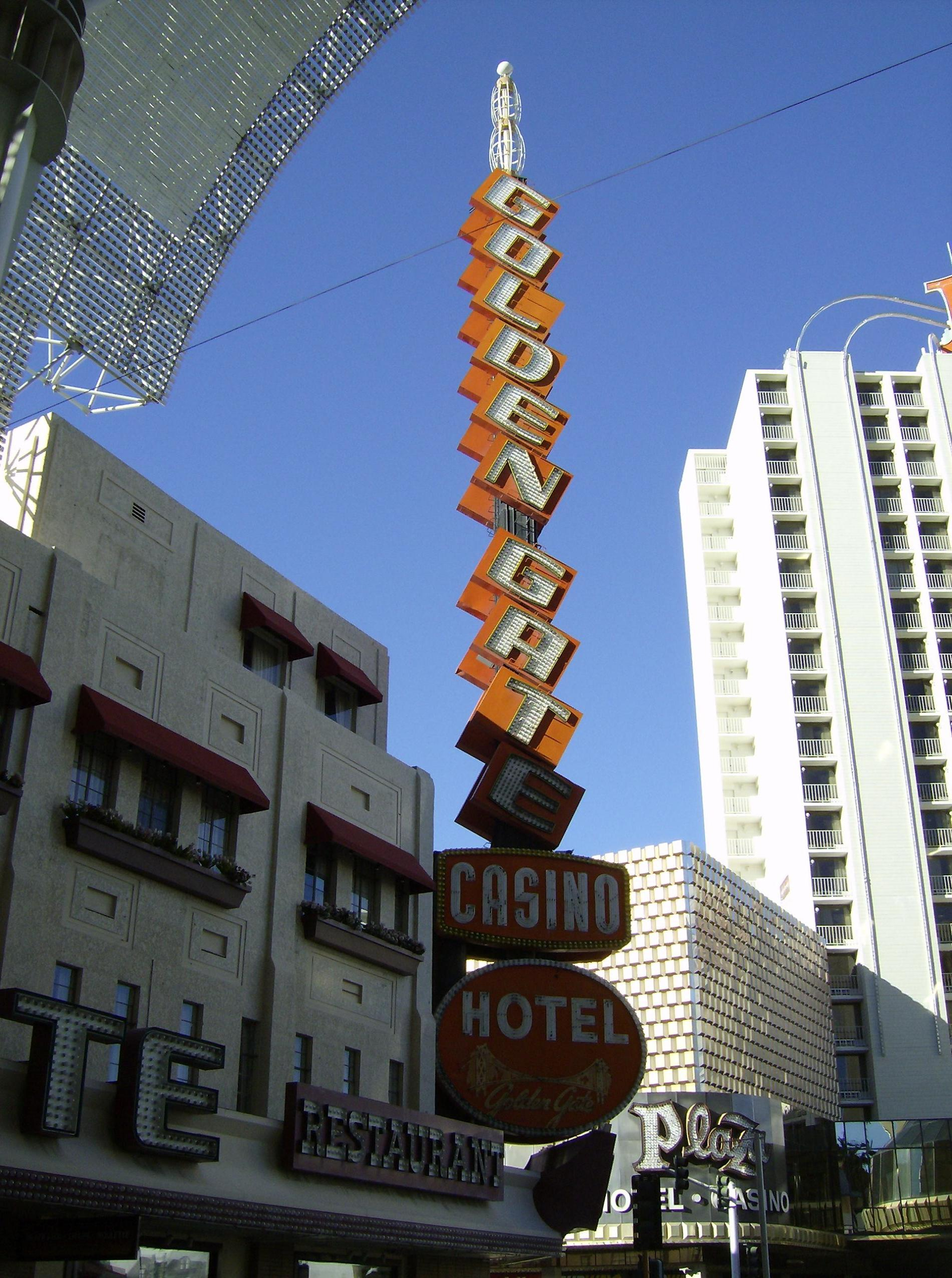
Golden Gate view

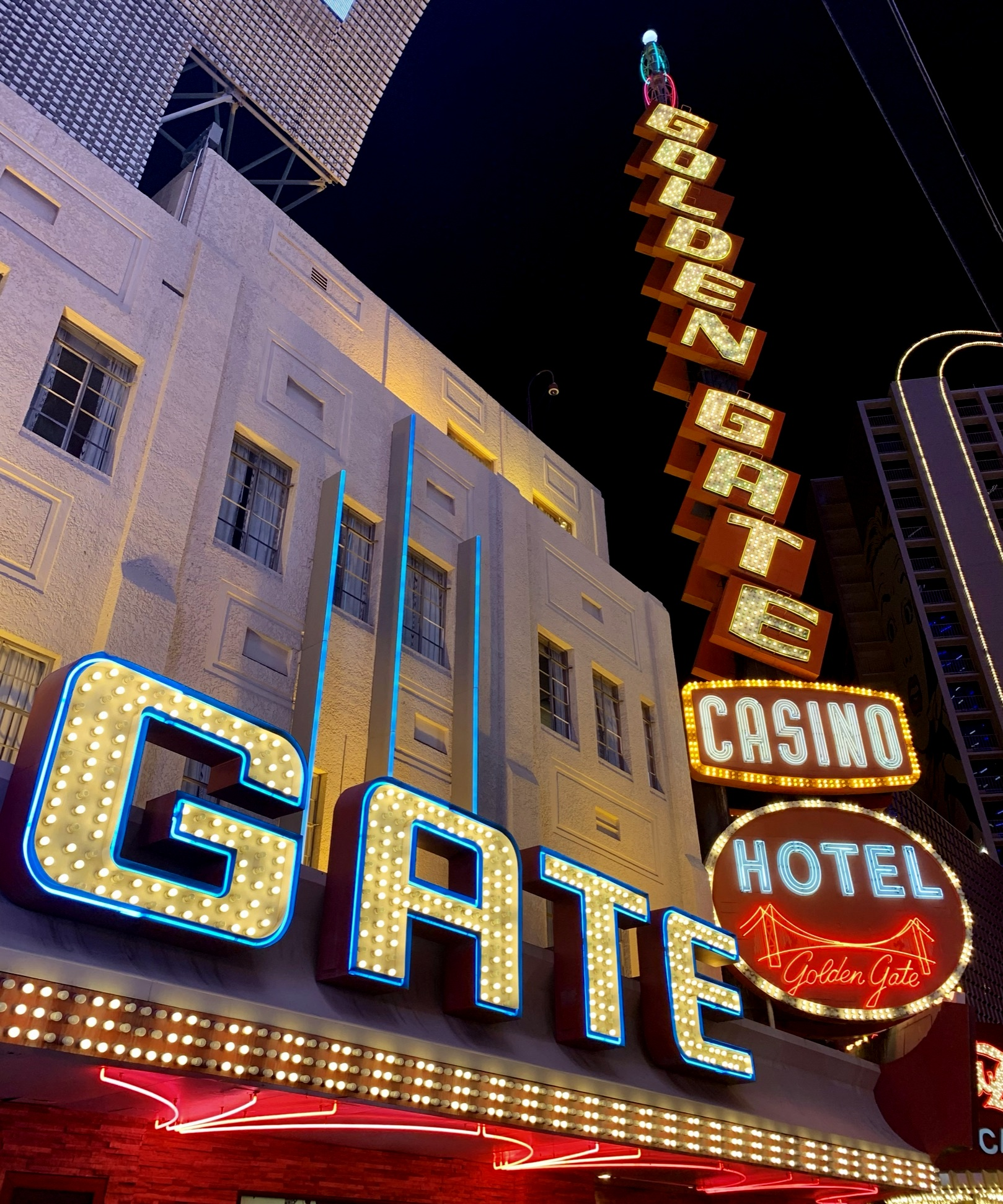
Golden Gate at night, 2021

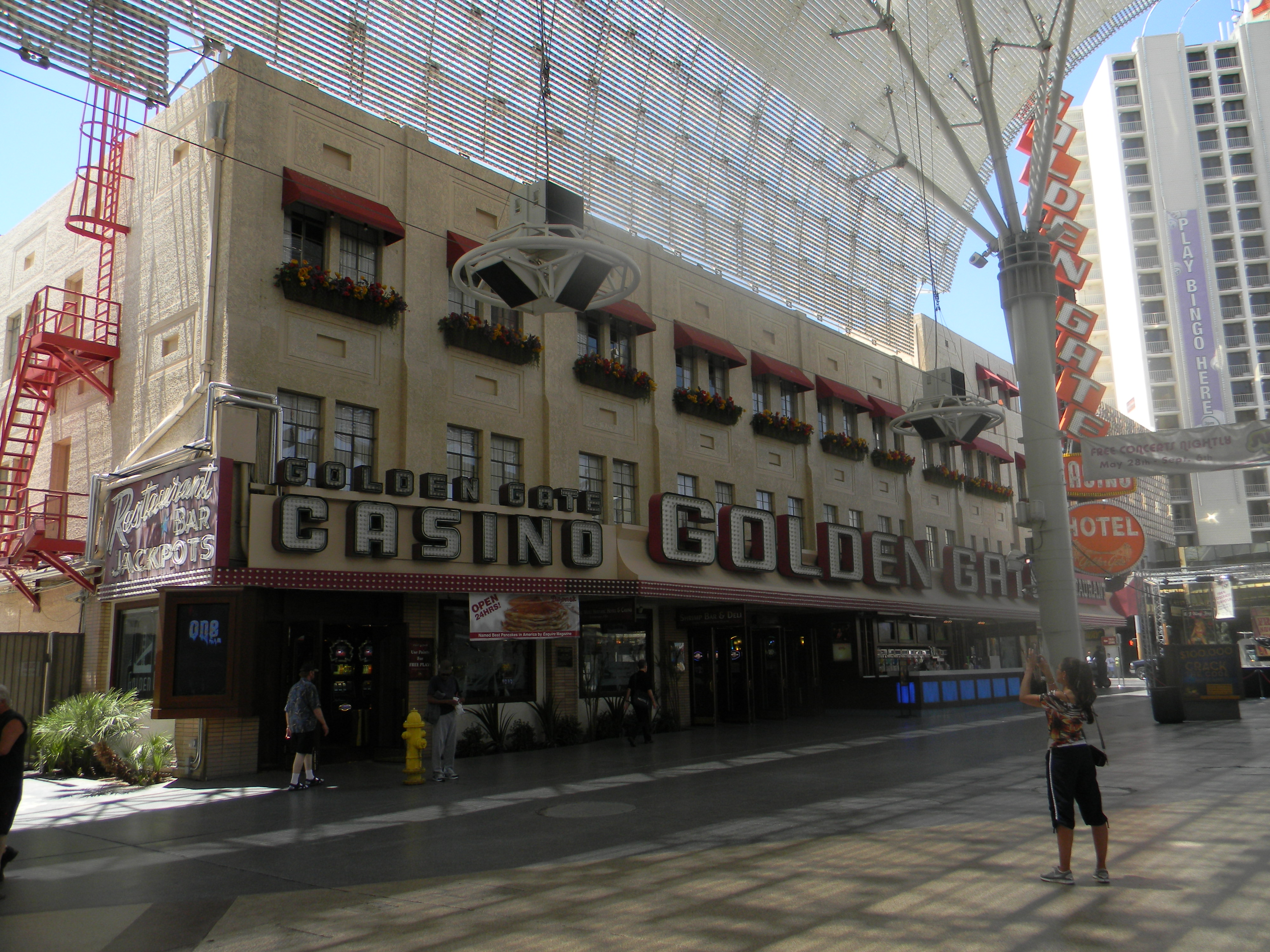
The hotel as seen from the Fremont Street Experience (2010)
