= Derek Stevens =

American businessman (born 1967)

- Born: September 17, 1967 (age 59); Detroit, Michigan, U.S.
- Education: University of Michigan; Wayne State University (MBA)
- Occupation: Businessman
- Spouse: Nicole Parthum
- Children: 3
- Relatives: Greg Stevens (brother)

Derek Stevens (born September 17, 1967) is an American businessman who owns several hotel-casinos in downtown Las Vegas. Stevens, along with his brother Greg, purchased the Golden Gate Hotel and Casino in 2008, followed in 2011 by Fitzgeralds, which they renamed as The D Las Vegas. He also owned the Las Vegas 51s baseball team from 2008 to 2013, and built the Downtown Las Vegas Events Center in 2014.

Stevens and his brother purchased the Las Vegas Club in 2015, and the Mermaids Casino a year later, demolishing both to build the Circa Resort & Casino. Stevens also launched Circa Sports, a chain of sportsbooks. Since the 1990s, he has also served as the CEO of Cold Heading Company, a manufacturer of auto parts that his grandfather started, based in his home state of Michigan.

== Early life and education ==
Stevens was born on September 17, 1967, in Detroit, Michigan. His father John Stevens was an architect, and his mother, Betty, was a high school teacher who had studied math and physics. His grandfather, Rene DeSeranno, started Cold Heading Company, an auto-parts manufacturer, in Warren, Michigan in 1952. He has a younger brother, Greg Stevens. The family lived in Grosse Pointe, Michigan, and Stevens attended Grosse Pointe South High School, where he played baseball and some football.

In 1990, Stevens graduated from University of Michigan, located in the city of Ann Arbor. Four years later, he earned a Master of Business Administration degree in finance, from Wayne State University in Detroit. He initially studied to be an engineer, but decided he wanted to be in business instead, after spending time in Ann Arbor.

== Career ==
Stevens' first job was working for three years as a valet along the Detroit River. He visited Las Vegas for the first time in the late 1980s, and became enamored with its various attractions. He made frequent visits from then on, often to attend sporting events, as well as conventions. Stevens took over his family run business Cold Heading Company in 1993 or 1994, after the CEO stepped down. Stevens initially took the job on a temporary basis, but would remain in the position for decades. Cold Heading manufactures nuts and bolts for auto companies. The company added a second plant, in Indiana, in 1998, and later expanded operations to Ohio. It also purchased a manufacturer of fasteners in 1999.

During the 1990s, Stevens began investing in gaming companies, buying stock in International Game Technology and the Rio hotel-casino, both in Las Vegas. In the 2000s, Stevens became a stockholder in Riviera Holdings, which owned the Riviera resort on the Las Vegas Strip. Stevens, through his company Desert Rock Enterprises, owned more than 1 million shares in the Strip resort. He invested in Las Vegas because Nevada has no state income tax.

Stevens, a sports fan, purchased the Las Vegas 51s baseball team in 2008. He owned it through Stevens Baseball Group, of which he was the chief executive. He sold the team four years later to a group that included Howard Hughes Corporation.

Although downtown Las Vegas is overshadowed by the Las Vegas Strip, Stevens believed that downtown hotel-casinos presented less expensive opportunities for a hotel revival of the area. In addition, Stevens did not have adequate financing to fully enter the Las Vegas Strip market. Stevens' brother Greg is an engineer who maintains a low-profile, in contrast to Derek's personality. The two have partnered on several projects, which helped revitalize the Fremont Street area of downtown Las Vegas. Derek Stevens serves as the public face for their projects. In 2008, they became co-owners in the Golden Gate Hotel and Casino in downtown Las Vegas. It took Stevens 18 months to receive a gaming license, and the Great Recession occurred as the brothers entered the gaming industry, although this would provide further opportunities for them because of reduced land values. The Riviera filed for bankruptcy in 2010, and Stevens became one of its owners upon reorganization of the resort. He later sold his interest to the Las Vegas Convention and Visitors Authority.

In 2011, the Stevens brothers purchased the Fitzgeralds hotel-casino in downtown Las Vegas and rebranded it a year later as The D Las Vegas, a reference to Derek's nickname "D". In 2013, he purchased the former Clark County Courthouse nearby, and demolished it to build the Downtown Las Vegas Events Center, which opened a year later. In 2014, Stevens became the first Las Vegas hotel-casino owner to accept bitcoin, although the currency is only used for non-gaming purchases.

In 2015, the Stevens brothers purchased the Las Vegas Club in downtown and eventually announced plans to build a new resort in its place. In 2016, they purchased the adjacent Mermaids Casino and Glitter Gulch strip club, both of which were demolished along with the Las Vegas Club. The Stevens had the Circa Resort & Casino built on the property, opening it in late 2020. Circa was the biggest project of Stevens' career. It was the first new hotel-casino to be built in the downtown area since The D, which originally opened in 1980. Stevens also launched Circa Sports, a chain of local sportsbooks, which expanded to Colorado in 2020.

Like casino operators in decades prior, Stevens is known for walking the casino floors at his properties and interacting with customers, a rarity compared to his corporate-owned rivals. He is also known for placing high bets on sports games, and for his marketing promotions. In 2020, he gave away 1,700 free airplane tickets to Las Vegas to help the city's economy amid the COVID-19 pandemic.

As of 2020, Stevens remains as CEO of Cold Heading Company, in addition to overseeing his casinos. He has no interest in entering the Detroit casino market, stating that the customer demographic is too different compared to Las Vegas. Michigan's income tax is another factor for not competing there.

== Personal life ==
Stevens is married to Nicole Parthum, who he met during first grade. In the 2010s, the couple lived in Birmingham, Michigan, but made frequent visits to Las Vegas.

Stevens has made frequent financial contributions to both Democratic and Republican candidates. He contributed $5,000 to Democrat Steve Sisolak and $10,000 to Republican Adam Laxalt during their 2018 bids for Nevada governor. Two years later, Stevens contributed an additional $10,000 to Governor Sisolak. In 2021, Stevens was seen as a potential Republican contender to face off against Sisolak in the 2022 Nevada gubernatorial election.
