= Vegas Vic =

Neon sign of a cowboy in Las Vegas, Nevada

Coordinates: 36°10′14″N 115°08′37″W

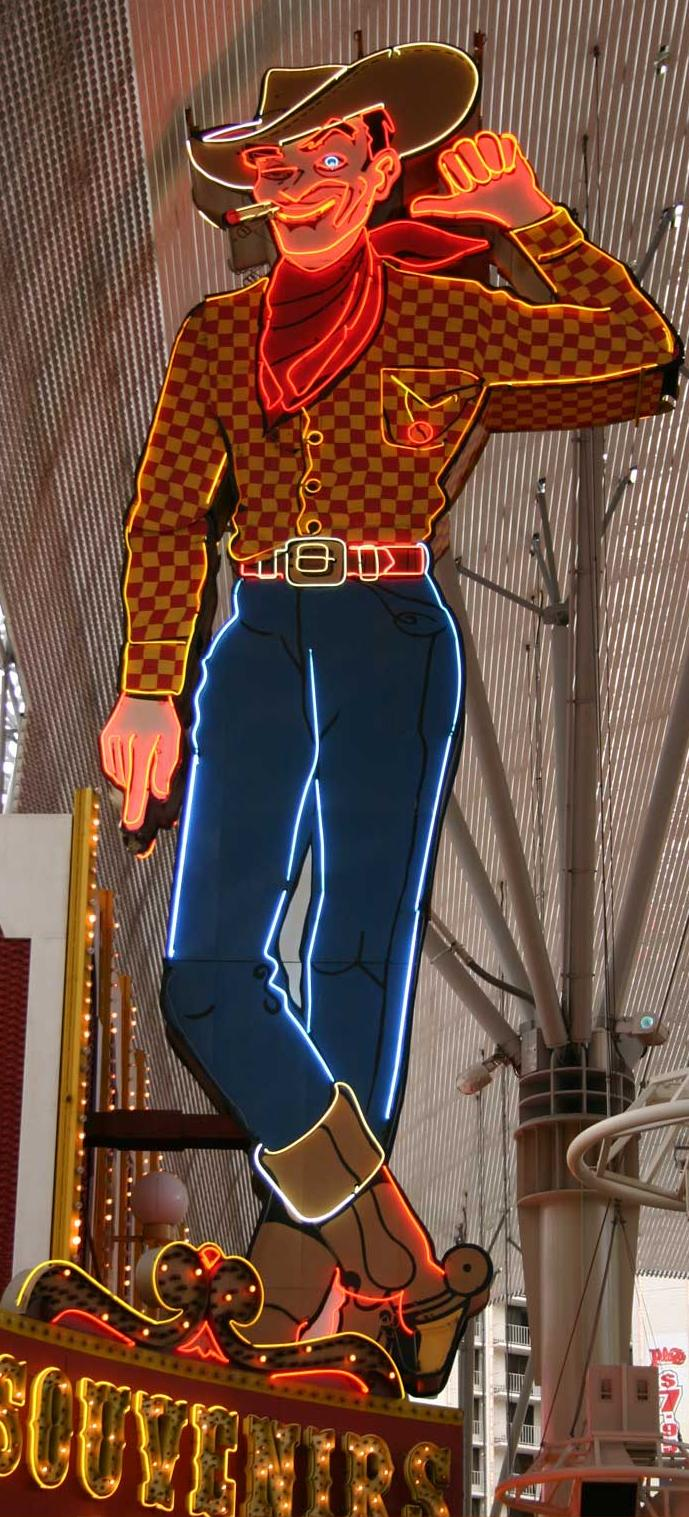
Vegas Vic post 1998 restoration

Vegas Vic is a neon sign portraying a cowboy which was erected on the exterior of The Pioneer Club in Las Vegas, Nevada, United States in 1951. The sign was a departure in graphic design from typeface based neon signs, to the friendly and welcoming human form of a cowboy. The sign's human-like abilities of talking and waving its arm received an immediate acceptance as the unofficial welcoming sign, reproduced thousands of times over the years and all over the world. The sign can still be found at 25 E Fremont Street, where it has been since 1951 on the exterior of what used to be The Pioneer Club but is currently a souvenir shop. The trademark is currently owned by Pioneer Hotel, Inc., which owns and operates the Pioneer Hotel and Gambling Hall on the Colorado River in Laughlin, Nevada. Laughlin has a twin of the Vegas Vic image on another large sign referred to as River Rick.

== History ==
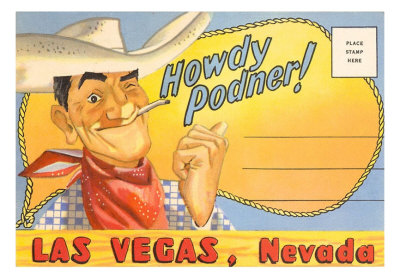
1948 Postcard of Vegas Vic's first use

Although the Pioneer Club no longer operates as a casino, the 40-foot (12 m) neon cowboy that was its mascot still exists. In 1947, the Las Vegas Chamber of Commerce hired a West-Marquis firm to draw visitors to Las Vegas. The company then created the first image of Vegas Vic and his friendly "Howdy Partner" greeting (deliberately misspelled as "Howdy Podner"). Due to the popularity of the cowboy, Young Electric Sign Company was commissioned to build a neon-sign version by the owners of the Pioneer Club. They then commissioned Pat Denner, who modeled it after the image in use by the Las Vegas Chamber of Commerce. The neon version was complete with a waving arm, a moving cigarette, and a recording of "HOWDY, PARTNER!!!" every 15-minutes voiced by Maxwell Kelch, the President of the Las Vegas Chamber of Commerce at the time. Vegas Vic was then erected on the exterior of the Pioneer club in 1951 on the southwest corner of First Street and Fremont Street replacing the sign that simply said Pioneer Club with an image of a horse drawn covered wagon.

In 1966, Lee Marvin was filming The Professionals and staying at the Mint Hotel. Marvin complained that Vegas Vic was too loud, so casino executives silenced Vegas Vic and it was left that way for nearly two decades. The speaking was restored in the 1980s, but as of 2006 no longer works. The arm stopped waving in 1991.

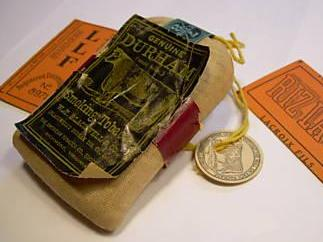
Bag of Durham tobacco

When the Fremont Street Experience was under construction in 1994, several feet were cut off of the brim of Vegas Vic's hat to make him fit properly under the curve of the canopy of the Fremont Street Experience. After the Pioneer Club closed in 1995, Vegas Vic fell into disrepair. The Neon Museum at the Fremont Street Experience stepped in and offered to restore and maintain the sign if the building owner paid for the electric bill to operate it. Under the proposal, the building owner would retain ownership of the sign but has since acknowledged that the Federally Registered Trademark for Vegas Vic is owned by Pioneer Hotel, Inc. If the building is sold, the sign would become the property of the Neon Museum who would then maintain it from that point on. The building owner ultimately declined the offer and eventually restored the sign themselves.

The red circle on his pocket is supposed to represent a Durham Tobacco tag that is dangling from a yellow string attached to the bag that is stowed away in his pocket (Vegas Vic represents a time when a cowboy rolled their own cigarettes from a bag of tobacco).

Vegas Vic was the first of what would become three neon cowboys at Nevada casinos. Wendover Will was erected a year later in 1952 at Stateline Casino and River Rick was erected in 1981 at the Pioneer Hotel & Gambling Hall in Laughlin. River Rick is virtually an identical copy of Vegas Vic, outfitted with a different color scheme.

Vegas Vic (erected 1951), Las Vegas (photographed by Carol Highsmith)

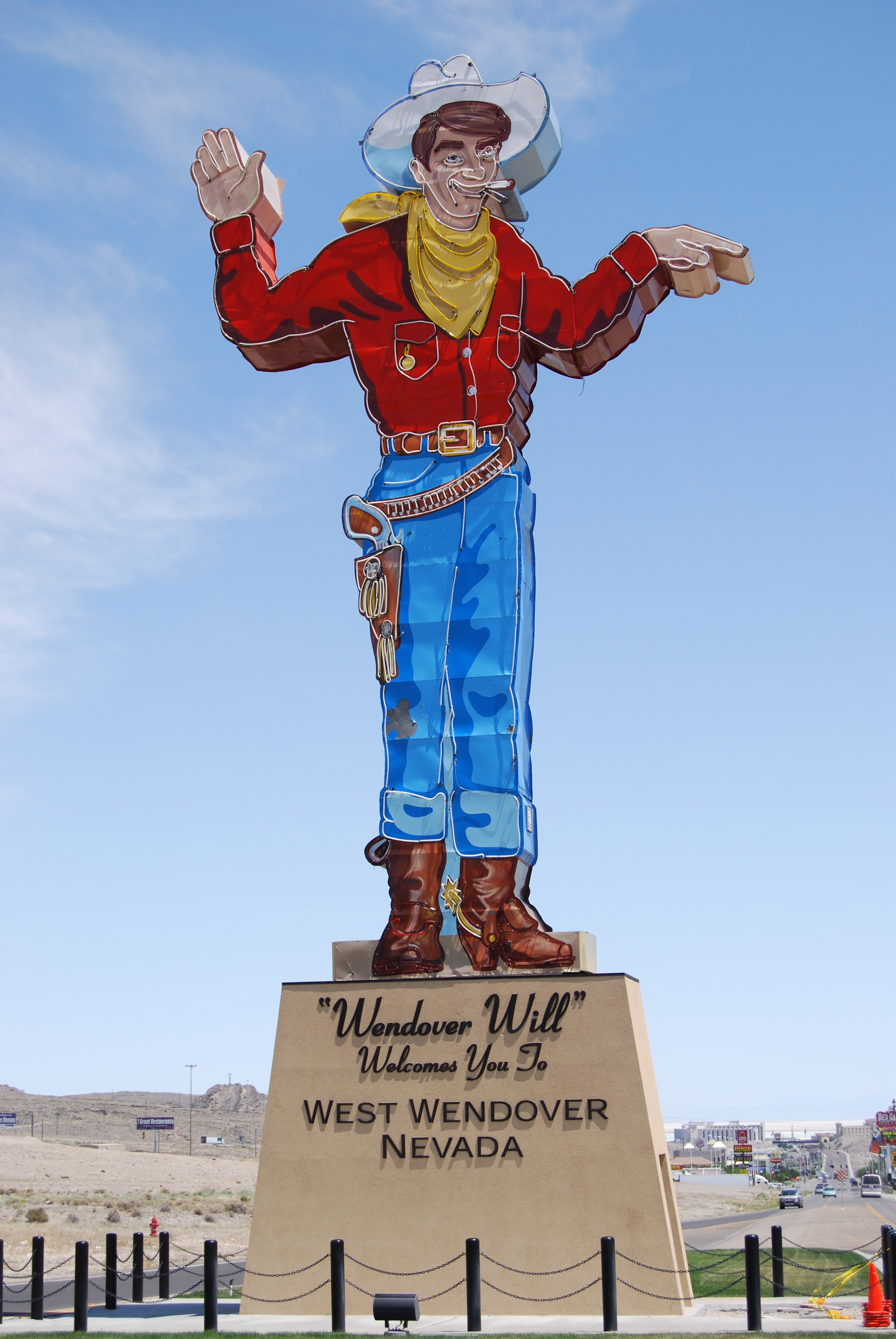
Wendover Will (erected 1952), Wendover

Vegas Vickie (erected 1980), Las Vegas (Highsmith)

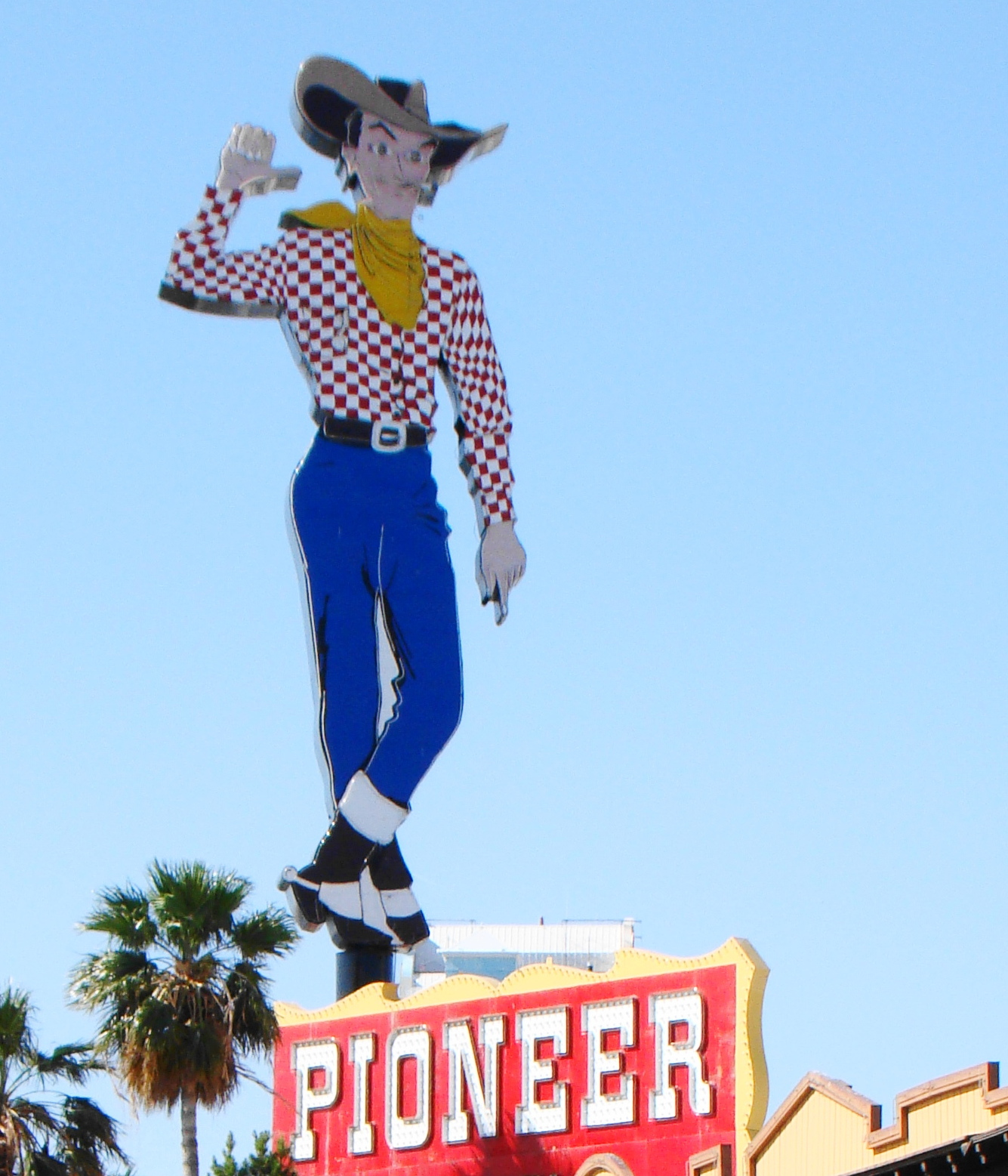
River Rick (erected 1981), Laughlin

In 1980, another neon sign, depicting a cowgirl in a fringed outfit seated with one leg kicking outward, was erected across Fremont Street. Standing over the Girls of Glitter Gulch strip club, she was known as Vegas Vickie (sometimes erroneously referred to as "Sassy Sally", for the nearby casino). Vickie was designed by Charles F. "Chuck" Barnard of Ad Art. Vic and Vickie were "married" in a 1994 ceremony during construction of the Fremont Street Experience. Vickie was removed in 2017 in preparation for the demolition of the strip club along with Mermaids Casino, La Bayou and the Las Vegas Club. Vegas Vickie has been restored and now resides inside the Circa Resort & Casino which opened on the same spot in 2020.

Vegas Vic has received new paint schemes through the years. Originally, from the 1950s through the 1960s, his shirt was white with yellow checkered stripes. Later during an early restoration in the 1970s, his shirt was painted solid yellow. When he was restored in 1998, his shirt was painted a red and yellow checkered pattern.

In April 2023, the current owner was cited with a violation due to the condition of the sign, and the sign was fully refurbished and lit up again by July 2023.

== In popular culture ==
- In The Amazing Colossal Man (1957), Glenn Manning, the giant, shreds Vegas Vic to pieces in its climactic sequence.
- In the Obsidian Entertainment video game Fallout: New Vegas and the Fallout television series, a Securitron named Victor acts as an ally to the player and a servant of the owner of New Vegas, Mr. House. Victor is based on Vegas Vic, bearing a similar face and greeting the player with "Howdy, partner!" A further reference to Vegas Vic can be seen in the sign for the Atomic Wrangler, also located on Freemont Street in game.
- Vegas Vic strongly resembles the Belgian comics hero Lucky Luke.
- A 1994 commercial for Miller Genuine Draft beer has a neon cowboy and cowgirl, similar to Vegas Vic and Vickie, "coming to life" in downtown Vegas to the tune of J. J. Cale's "After Midnight".
- In the Dumb and Dumber episode "Dumb Luck", Harry and Lloyd visit Las Vegas and due to the sign's gesturing mistake Vic for a hitchhiker. The episode ends with them taking Vic in their car and dropping him outside town limits.
- Vegas Vic can be seen in the background in some shots in the music video for the song "I Still Haven't Found What I'm Looking For" by U2
- During the Wonderful Wonderful tour, The Killers, who formed in Las Vegas and make frequent references to the city in their music and videos, included the image of Vegas Vic in the background on the song "The Man".
- Vegas Vic makes an appearance in The Simpsons episode "I Married Marge".
- Vegas Vic and Vickie both appear in Honey, I Blew Up the Kid, when the enlarged Adam Szalinski is treating Fremont Street like a playground for him. At one point, he nearly hits Vic while playing with a convertible carrying his big brother Nick and babysitter in it, and also damages Vickie's leg when he places the car on it, causing it to buckle under the strain and nearly drop Nick and the babysitter to the street below, before Adam saves them, while Vickie's leg somewhat recovers from the damage.
- Vegas Vic and Vickie make an appearance in the fictionalized rendition of Las Vegas in the video game Grand Theft Auto: San Andreas, based on characters from the prequel Grand Theft Auto Vice City.

== Gallery ==
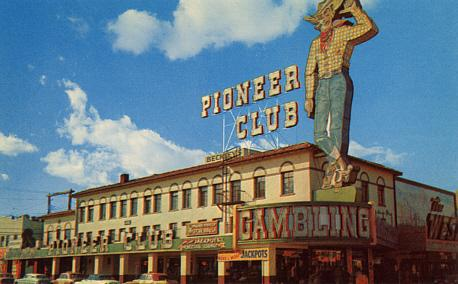
The Pioneer Club 1950s (Yellow and white plaid shirt)

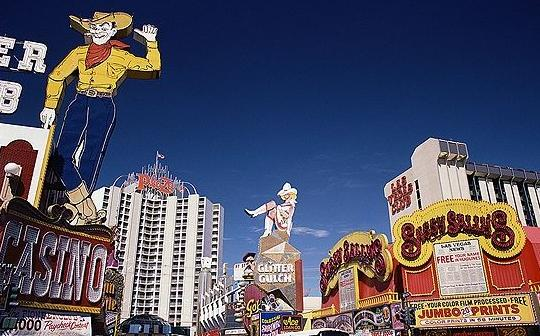
The Pioneer Club 1980s (Solid yellow shirt), with Vegas Vickie in the background

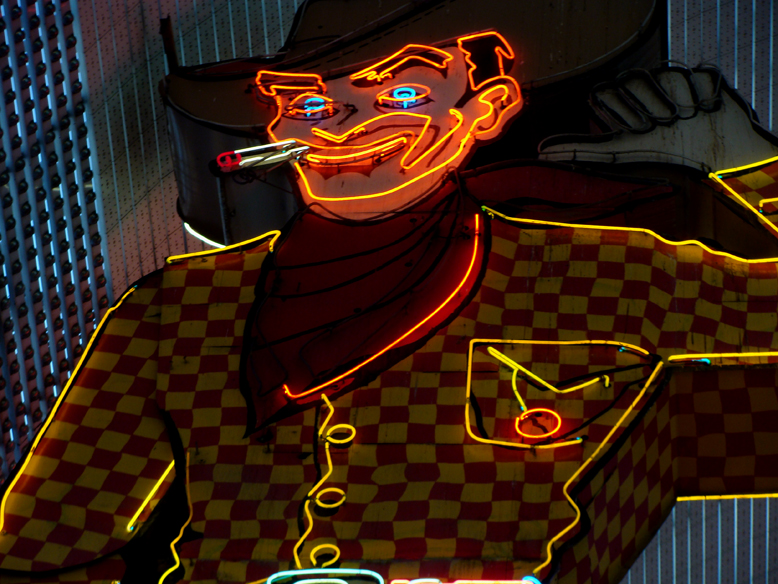
Post-1998 restoration (Red and yellow checkered shirt)

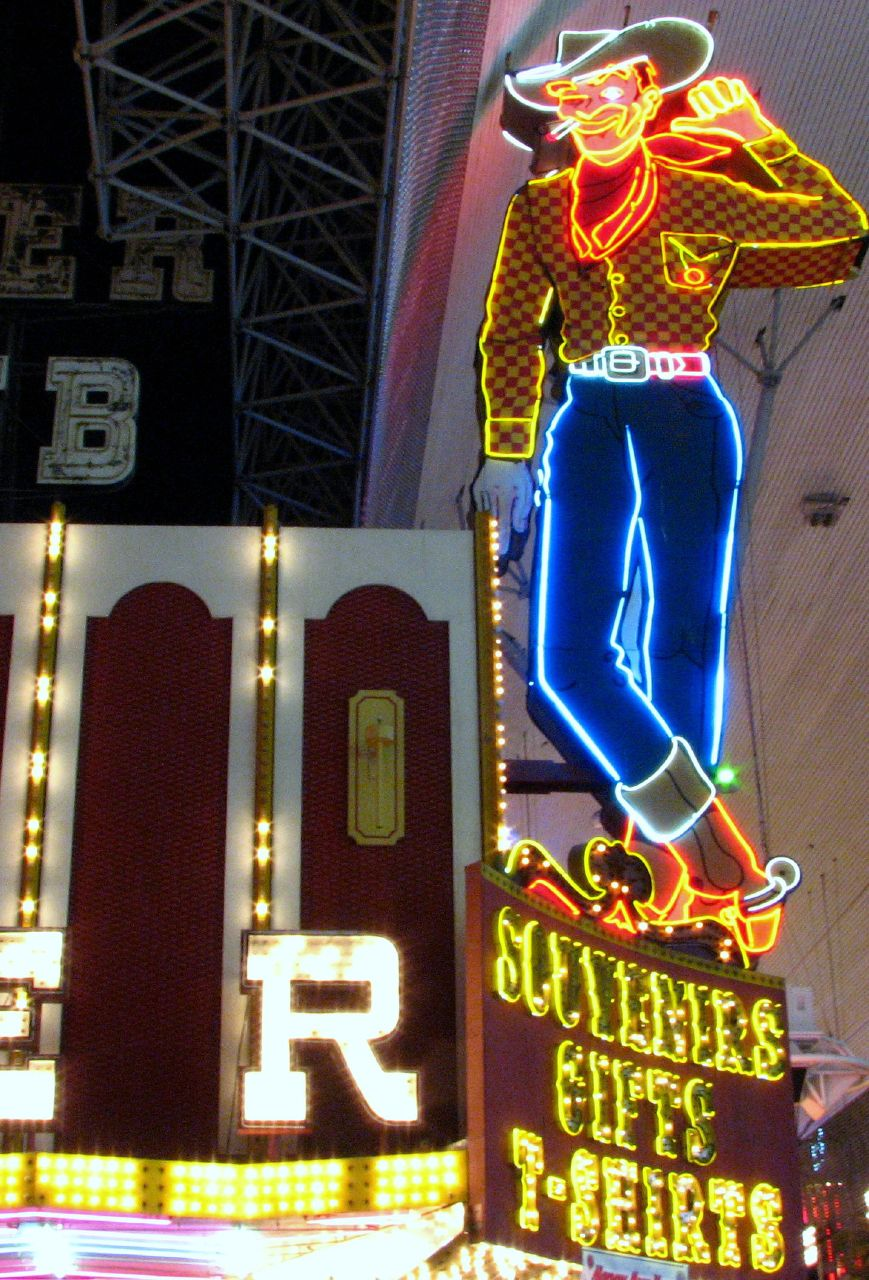
Vegas Vic, the neon cowboy of Fremont Street

== See also ==
- Welcome to Fabulous Las Vegas sign
- Stardust sign
- Big Tex
