= Girls of Glitter Gulch =

Former gentleman's club in Las Vegas, Nevada

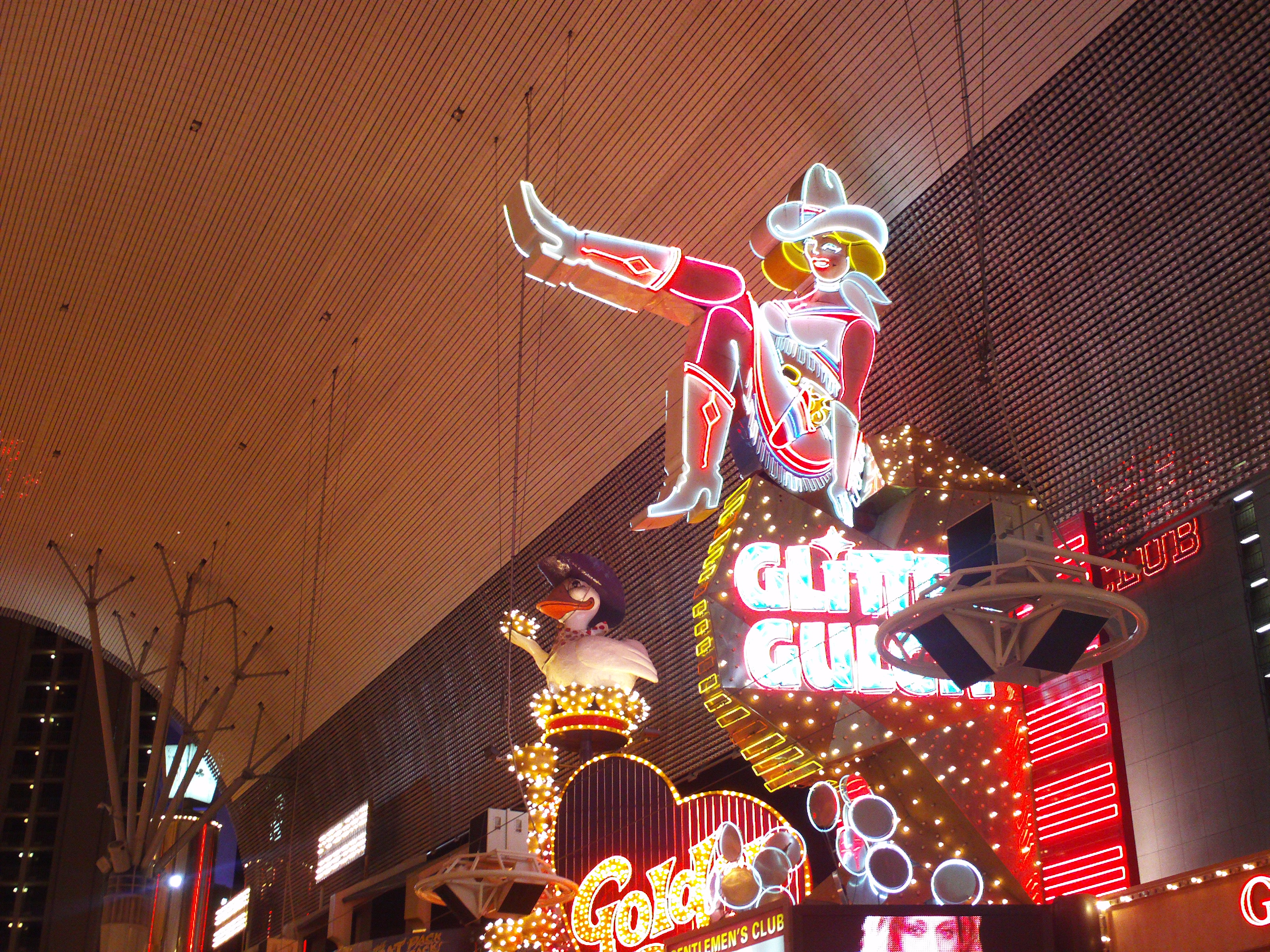
- Vegas Vickie and Golden Goose above the Glitter Gulch.
- Former names: Golden Goose (1975-1991)
- Address: 22 Fremont Street; Las Vegas, Nevada

Construction
- Opened: 1975 (Casino), 1991 (gentleman's club)
- Closed: 2017
- Demolished: 2018

The Girls of Glitter Gulch was a gentlemen's club located on Fremont Street in Las Vegas, Nevada, the resort originally opened as the Golden Goose Casino, before closing in 1991 to be converted into a gentleman's club, and retaining the Vegas Vickie sign and Golden Goose sign from the casino.

== History ==
As early as the 1940s, the area of Fremont Street had been known as "Glitter Gulch" due to the abundance of neon signs.

Golden Goose would be opened in 1975 by Herb Pastor, as his first casino he would open. The Golden Goose would have a large duck on its roof on display over Fremont Street, which it would stand over Fremont Street until 2018.

In 1980, Vegas Vickie was erected above the Golden Goose, and would also remain there until 2018.

In 1991, Pastor would buy out the neighboring Glitter Gulch Casino, and merge the two casinos to convert them into a strip club.

In 2016, Mermaids, La Bayou, and Glitter Gulch would be closed, and later demolished to make way for Circa, Vegas Vickie and the Golden Goose would be removed in 2018, and then restored by YESCO, and would be restored and placed in front of the Circa, and down Fremont Street respectively in 2020.

== See also ==
- La Bayou
- Mermaids Casino
- Vegas Vic
