= Mayme Stocker =

American casino owner (1875-1972)

Mayme Stocker (September 5, 1875 – December 12, 1972) was an American business owner who was the first person in Las Vegas to legally own a gaming license. She opened the Northern Hotel in 1920, an establishment that covertly sold alcohol under the guise of a soda shop that would later become the now-defunct La Bayou casino.

She was born in Reading, Pennsylvania in 1875 to George and Anna May Clifton, and was the oldest of 6 children. Her mother died while she was in the 8th grade, and she was left to take care of her siblings. She married railroad worker Oscar Stocker at the age of 16, with whom she had 3 children – Clarence, Harold and Lester. Stocker followed railroad jobs, reaching Las Vegas in 1911, where she would live for the rest of her life.

When she died at the age of 97 in 1972, Mayme Stocker was a member of the Republican Party, the Emblem Club at her local Elks Lodge, and the Daughters of the American Revolution.
