= Pioneer Club Las Vegas =

Former casino in 20th-century Downtown Las Vegas

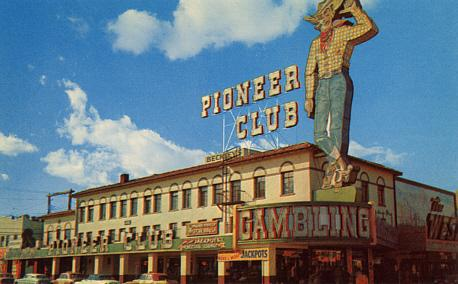
- The Pioneer Club, 1950s

- Location within Downtown Las Vegas Location within Nevada
- Interactive map of Pioneer Club
- Location: Las Vegas, Nevada 89101; 25 E Fremont Street; 36.1712°N 115.1454°W
- Opened: April 10, 1942
- Closed: 1995; 31 years ago
- Theme: Old Western
- Signature attractions: Vegas Vic
- Casino type: Land
- Owner: Schiff Enterprises

The Pioneer Club Las Vegas was a casino that opened in 1942 and was located in Downtown Las Vegas, Nevada, at 25 East Fremont Street. It ceased operating as a casino in 1995, the same year the Fremont Street Experience was completed.

== History ==
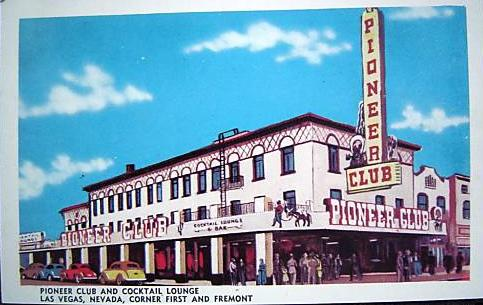
The Pioneer Club in the late 1940s, before Vegas Vic

The Pioneer Club and Cocktail Lounge opened in April 1942 on the corner of First Street and Fremont Street. In the late 1940s, it moved to its final location, a building dated to 1918 that housed multiple businesses, the last of which was Beckley's Mens Wear.

In 1965, the Pioneer Club bought the Elwell Hotel located at 200 South First Street directly behind the Pioneer Club and renamed it the Pioneer Club Hotel. The hotel was sold in 1969 and became the Golden Hotel. In 1983, the Pioneer Club bought Club Bingo, located to the west of it, and enlarged its casino area. From 1956 to 1967, it was called the New Pioneer Club. In 1984, the Golden Nugget bought the hotel and demolished it, building a parking garage for its casino and hotel in its place.

For many years, the Pioneer Club was one of the downtown's leading casinos.

Margaret Elardi, who also owned the Frontier Hotel on the Strip and later the Pioneer Hotel & Gambling Hall casino in Laughlin, owned the club for a while, followed by Gold Strike Resorts. In 1992, new owners purchased the Pioneer Club but were unable to compete with the larger casinos on Fremont Street, both at the beginning and at the end of the Fremont Street Experience, or with the large new megaresorts on the Strip. The owners closed the venerable casino in 1995, and it remained vacant until 1998, when Schiff Enterprises bought the Pioneer Club and opened a souvenir store inside. The vintage Pioneer Club signs and Vegas Vic sign still exist on the exterior of the building.

== Vegas Vic ==
Although the Pioneer Club no longer operates as a casino, Vegas Vic (the 40 ft neon cowboy) lives on. In 1947, the Las Vegas Chamber of Commerce hired a West-Marquis firm, which invented the Fremont Street Cowboy Vegas Vic and his friendly "Howdy Podner" greeting.

The Young Electric Sign Company was commissioned to build the neon version of the sign by the owners of the Pioneer Club. They then commissioned Pat Denner, who modeled it after the image used by the Las Vegas Chamber of Commerce in 1947, consisting of a cowboy in blue jeans with a yellow-checked shirt and red bandana. Vegas Vic was then erected on the exterior of the building in 1951, changing the exterior of the Pioneer Club forever.

Vegas Vic and the exterior of the Pioneer Club are prominently featured in shots from the 1971 James Bond film Diamonds Are Forever.

== Gallery ==
The Pioneer Club, 1950s

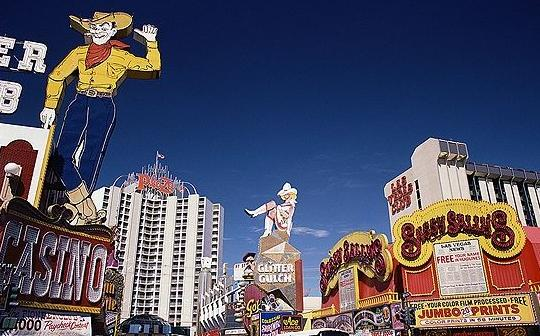
The Pioneer Club, 1973

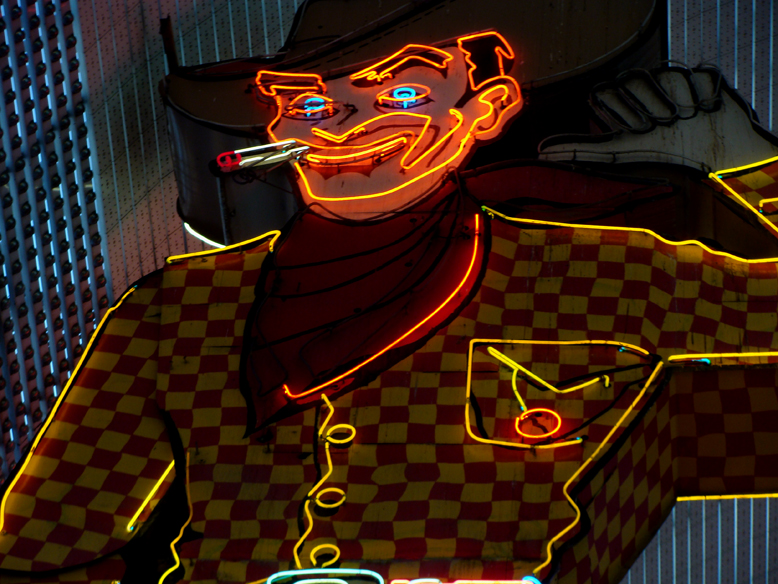
Vegas Vic closeup, post-1998 restoration
