= Fremont Street Experience =

Pedestrian mall and attraction in Downtown Las Vegas

Coordinates: 36°10′15″N 115°08′39″W

Fremont Street Experience Fremont Street
- Glitter Gulch
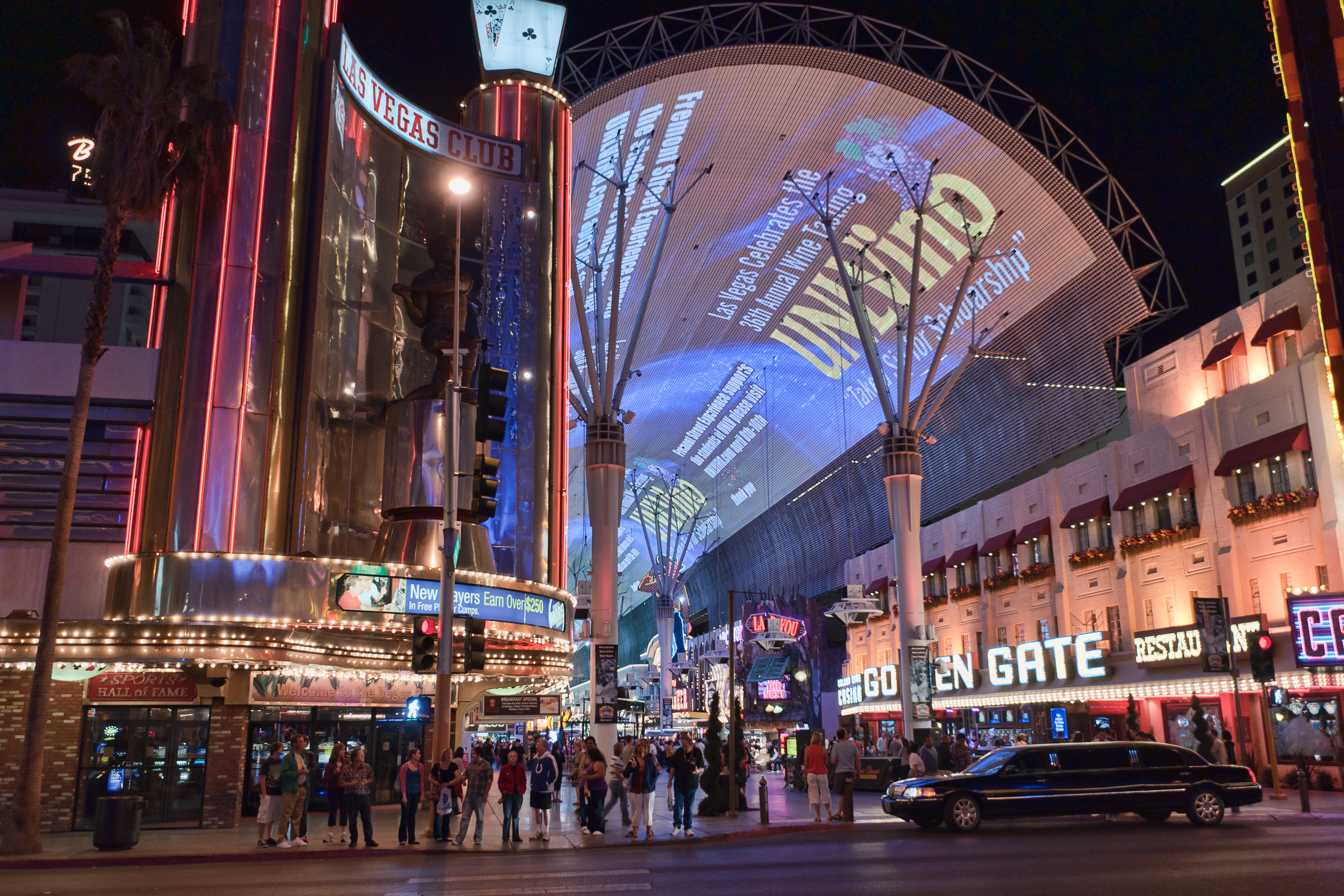
- The FSE with the neon lights on in 2010 with The Las Vegas Club on the left which closed in 2015 and was replaced by the Circa in 2020
- Interactive map of Fremont Street Experience; Fremont Street
- Namesake: John C. Frémont
- Owner: FSE, LLC
- Length: 0.8 mi (1.3 km)
- Addresses: 0–500
- Location: Las Vegas
- West end: Main Street
- East end: Las Vegas Boulevard

Construction
- Construction start: September 16, 1994
- Completed: July 1995
- Inauguration: December 14, 1995

Other
- Designer: Jon Jerde

The Fremont Street Experience (FSE) is a pedestrian mall and attraction in downtown Las Vegas, Nevada. The FSE occupies the westernmost five blocks of Fremont Street, including the area known for years as "Glitter Gulch", and portions of some other adjacent streets.

The central attraction is a barrel vault canopy, 90 ft (27 m) high at the peak and four blocks, or about 1,375 ft (419 m), in length.

While Las Vegas is known for never turning the outside casino lights off, each show begins by turning off the lights on all of the buildings, including the casinos, under the canopy. Before each show, one bidirectional street that crosses the Experience is blocked off for safety.

Concerts, usually free, are also held on three stages. The venue has become a major tourist attraction for downtown Las Vegas, and is also the location of the SlotZilla zip lines and the city's annual New Year's Eve celebration.

== History ==
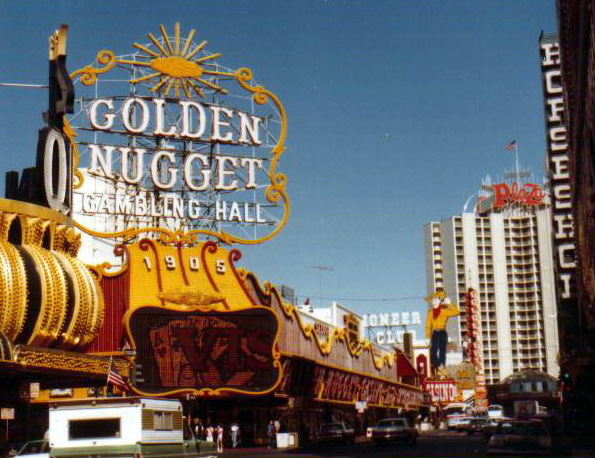
Fremont Street in 1983

Fremont Street is the locale of several Las Vegas firsts, including first hotel (Hotel Nevada, opened in 1906 and since renamed Golden Gate), first telephone (1907), first paved street (1925), first Nevada gaming license (issued to the Northern Club at 15 E. Fremont Street), first traffic light, first elevator (the Apache Hotel in 1932), and the first high-rise (the Fremont Hotel in 1956). The Horseshoe was the first casino to install carpeting, while the Golden Nugget was the first structure designed from the ground up to be a casino. For many years, the western end of Fremont Street was the area most commonly portrayed whenever producers wanted to evoke the lights of Las Vegas. The large number of neon signs earned the area the nickname "Glitter Gulch".

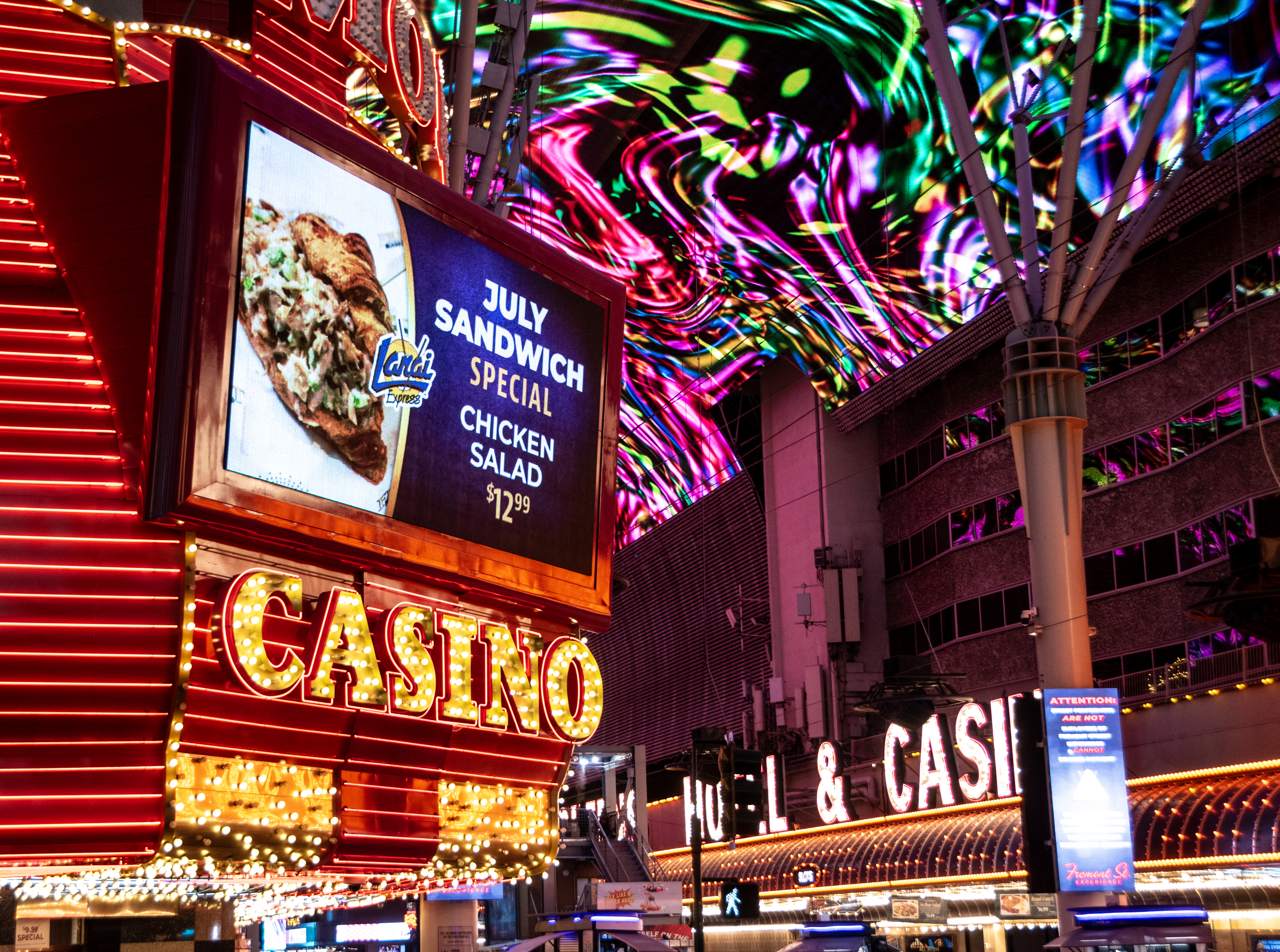

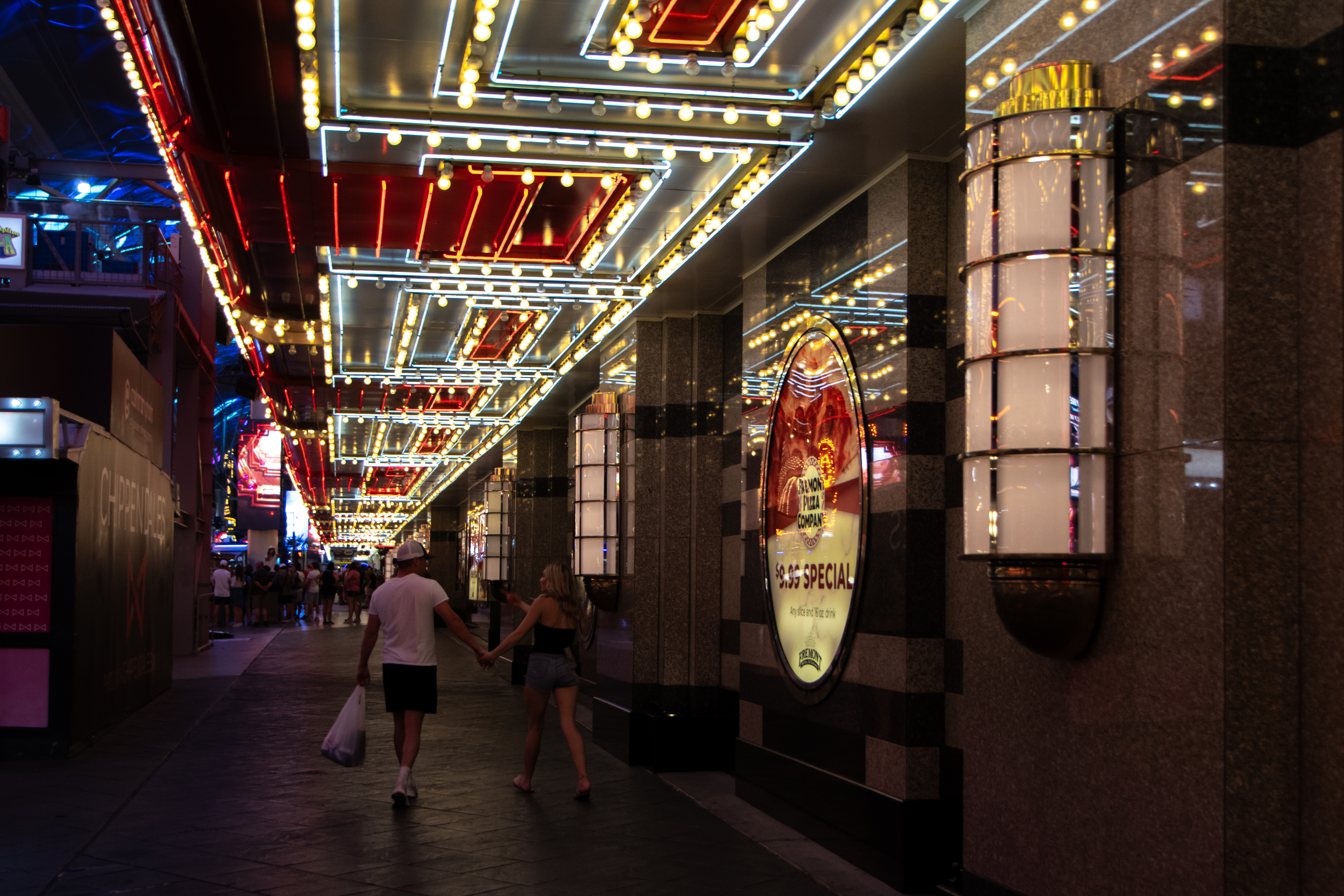
The Fremont Street Experience in 2025

But over the years, the center of casino activity shifted from downtown to beyond the city limits. By 1992, when the Las Vegas Strip held some 80 percent of the casino market, Downtown Las Vegas hotels and casinos sought to build an attraction that would lure more visitors. Paramount Pictures head Stanley Jaffe refused to approve a proposal to build a life-sized Starship Enterprise, so the Fremont Street Experience was chosen. The Experience was financed and developed and is managed by FSE, LLC, a cooperative venture owned and operated by a group of downtown hotel/casino companies that own eight hotel/casinos.

It was the second Las Vegas project of architect Jon Jerde, whose firm was paid about $900,000 by the City of Las Vegas to create a show concept for the downtown area. Jerde's design included a floating sky parade that was to be suspended from the canopy. The concept was accepted by the Fremont Street Experience as well as the City of Las Vegas. Ultimately Jerde's sky parade concept was scrapped, but the architectural design for the canopy was carried through.

The local architect of record, Mary Kozlowski Architect Inc., cited the following as problems with Jerde's sky parade concept:

1. Perspective: The view of the parade from below made the concept unworkable — to properly view the project would require that visitors stand at a raised elevation such as a third or fourth floor vantage point.
2. Wind: The addition of the canopy over Fremont Street would create a wind tunnel causing a dangerous condition for people on the floats who would be trapped. Also the potential for harmonic motion as the floats swung back and forth in the wind potentially resulting in massive structural failure of the canopy and fatalities.
3. Sand: The combination of desert sand and the mechanical systems of the sky parade would make the attraction difficult to maintain.

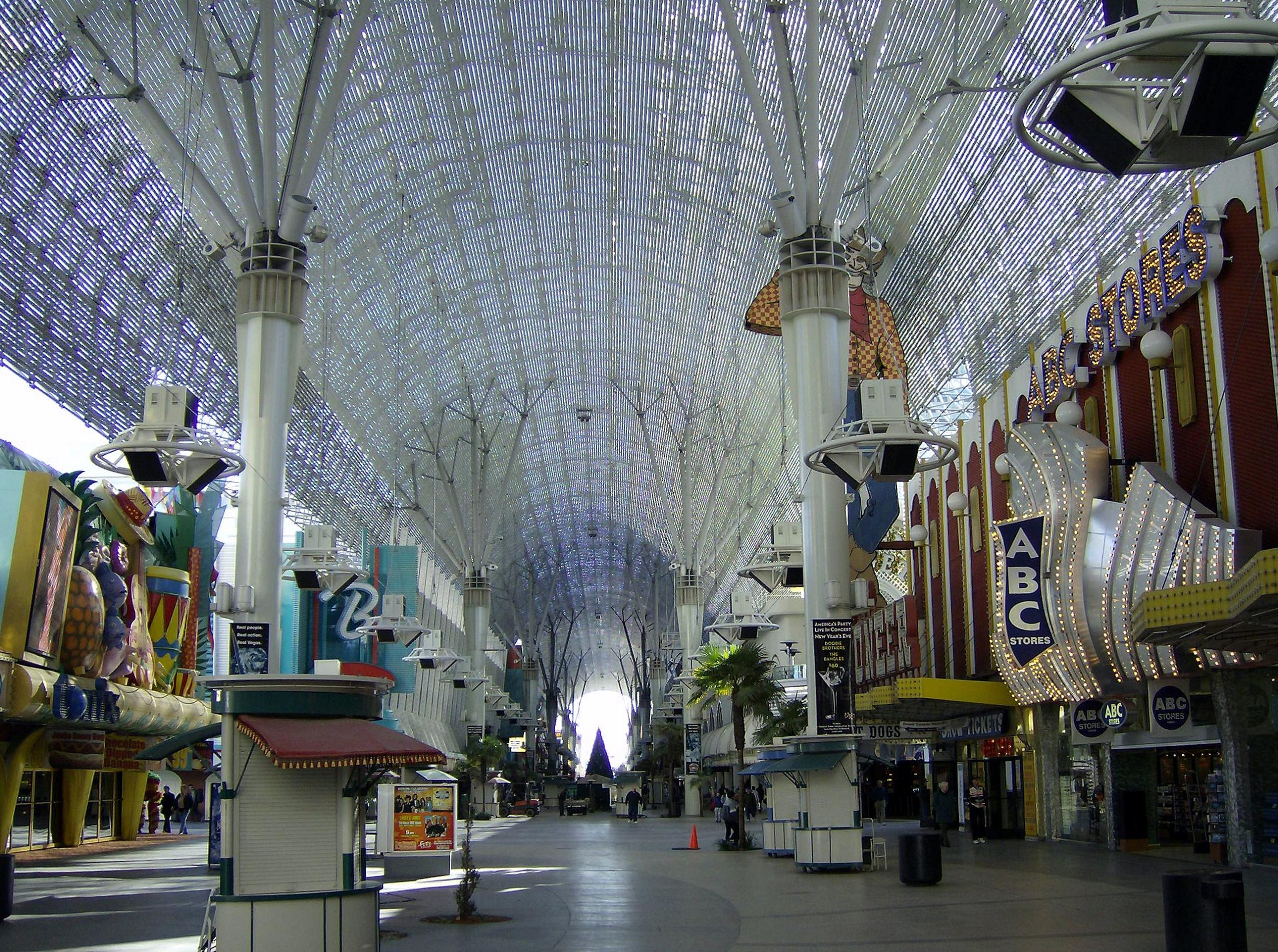
Fremont Street light canopy during daytime in 2008

A new concept for the show was necessary quickly as funds were already available and the overall schedule was set. The concept for the show as it now exists was conceived by architect Mary Kozlowski who had grown up in Las Vegas and knew and loved Fremont Street. It was a light show on the underside of the canopy — the world's largest and most spectacular. Peter Smith, executive vice-president of Atlandia Design, recognized the beauty and practicality of the concept. Jerde, FSE and the City of Las Vegas embraced the show concept.

Kozlowski's concept was to use a combination of four colored light bulbs per "light" which allowed a full spectrum of colors. The Young Electric Sign Company assisted in creating the test panels and in the final installation. After the Fremont Street Experience opened, the light bulbs were checked nightly to ensure that all were functioning properly. To accomplish this massive undertaking, the length of the canopy was divided into panels. Each panel was checked by separately turning on each of the four colored light bulbs. A maintenance worker on a lift would then replace any bulbs that were out. The most expensive bulb cost nearly $15 to replace.

The canopy was expected to cost $63 million. Downtown casino owners pledged $18 million to help pay for the project, and they supported a two-percent increase on room tax for most downtown hotels. The Las Vegas Redevelopment Agency also agreed to provide approximately $27.6 million to build a parking garage and pay for street improvements. The city wanted the Las Vegas Convention and Visitors Authority to pay a remaining $6 million for the project.

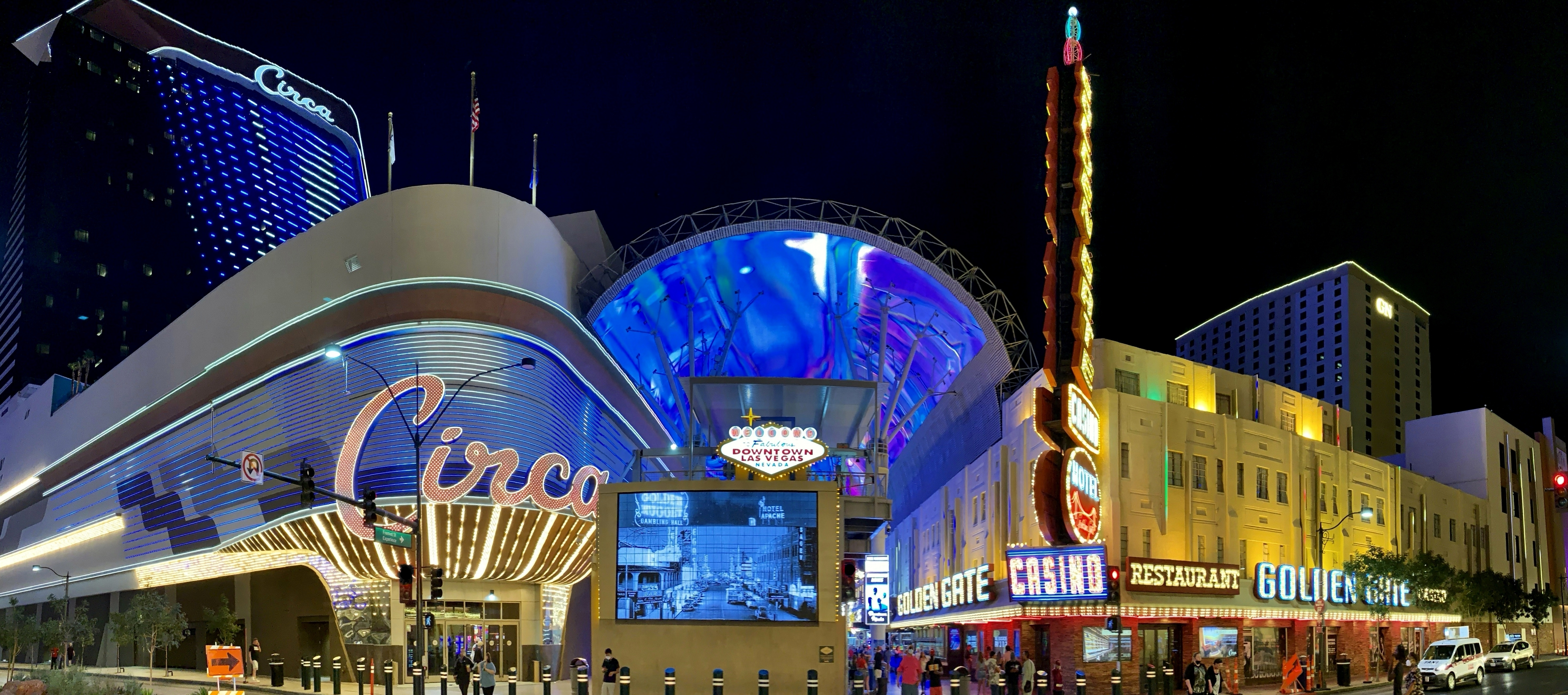
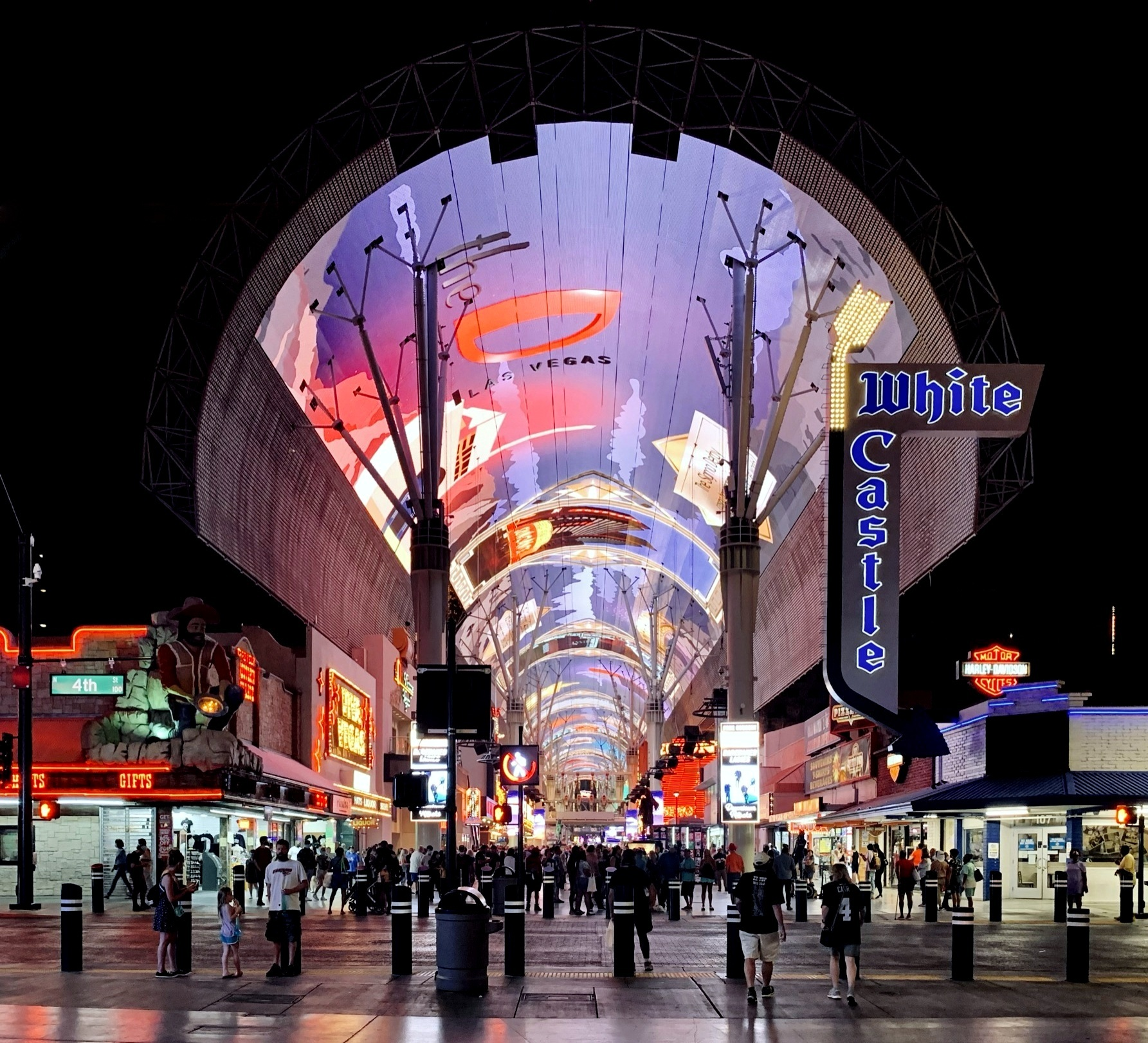
West (top) and east (bottom) ends of the Fremont Street Experience in 2021

On September 7, 1994, a five-block section of Fremont Street was closed to automobile traffic for good, and groundbreaking was held on September 16. After that, the digging up of the street and the installation of the support poles continued into December. On February 15, 1995, the space frames were brought in and the roof began to take shape. The last piece was installed in July 1995.

The official public preview was held in conjunction with the Nevada Symphony. The light show was opened on December 14, 1995. The first New Year's party was held on December 31, 1995.

In 1996, a horse-and-rider neon sign from the Hacienda hotel-casino was placed at the FSE's east entrance, at the intersection of Las Vegas Boulevard and Fremont Street. It was added by the Neon Museum.

Permanent stages were added in the early 2000s, eliminating the need to bring in temporary stages for every event. The sound system was upgraded in June 2001.

On June 14, 2004, a $17 million upgrade was unveiled that would feature a 12.5-million LED display and more color combinations than the original display, which was composed of incandescent lighting.

The initial $70 million investment and the continued improvements have resulted in successful and ongoing downtown redevelopment. The City of Las Vegas and the downtown casinos have benefited as more than 60% of visitors to the downtown area are lured by the overhead light show and stage shows and stay to enjoy the attractions of the nearby casinos.

A $32 million renovation of the video screen began in May 2019 and was scheduled to conclude six months later. New LED lights would make the screen four times the resolution and seven times brighter than before. The upgrade was designed and constructed by the Illinois-based Watchfire Signs. Also in development was a smartphone app that would allow visitors to choose the next song to be played on Fremont Street, and would also allow them to watch the canopy show on their phone. In November 2019, plans were announced for a new LED sign, 27 feet by 14 feet, that would show images of Fremont Street throughout its history. The sign, part of the $32 million renovation, would be built on the east side of Main Street and Fremont Street, and was expected to be operational the following month. Work on the canopy video display was concluded as of December 2019, with the official unveiling scheduled for that New Year's Eve.

In 2020, ShotPoint gunshot detection system was integrated into the giant LED canopy and the existing cameras to alert law enforcement to gunshots in real-time. In addition to over 300 video cameras monitoring the crowd beneath the canopy; at the close of 2024, 22 new surveillance cameras that scan license plates for law enforcement were activated along streets that intersect with the Fremont Street Experience.

Part of the Academy Award winning film Anora was filmed at the Fremont Street Experience in 2023.

== Major features ==
=== Viva Vision ===
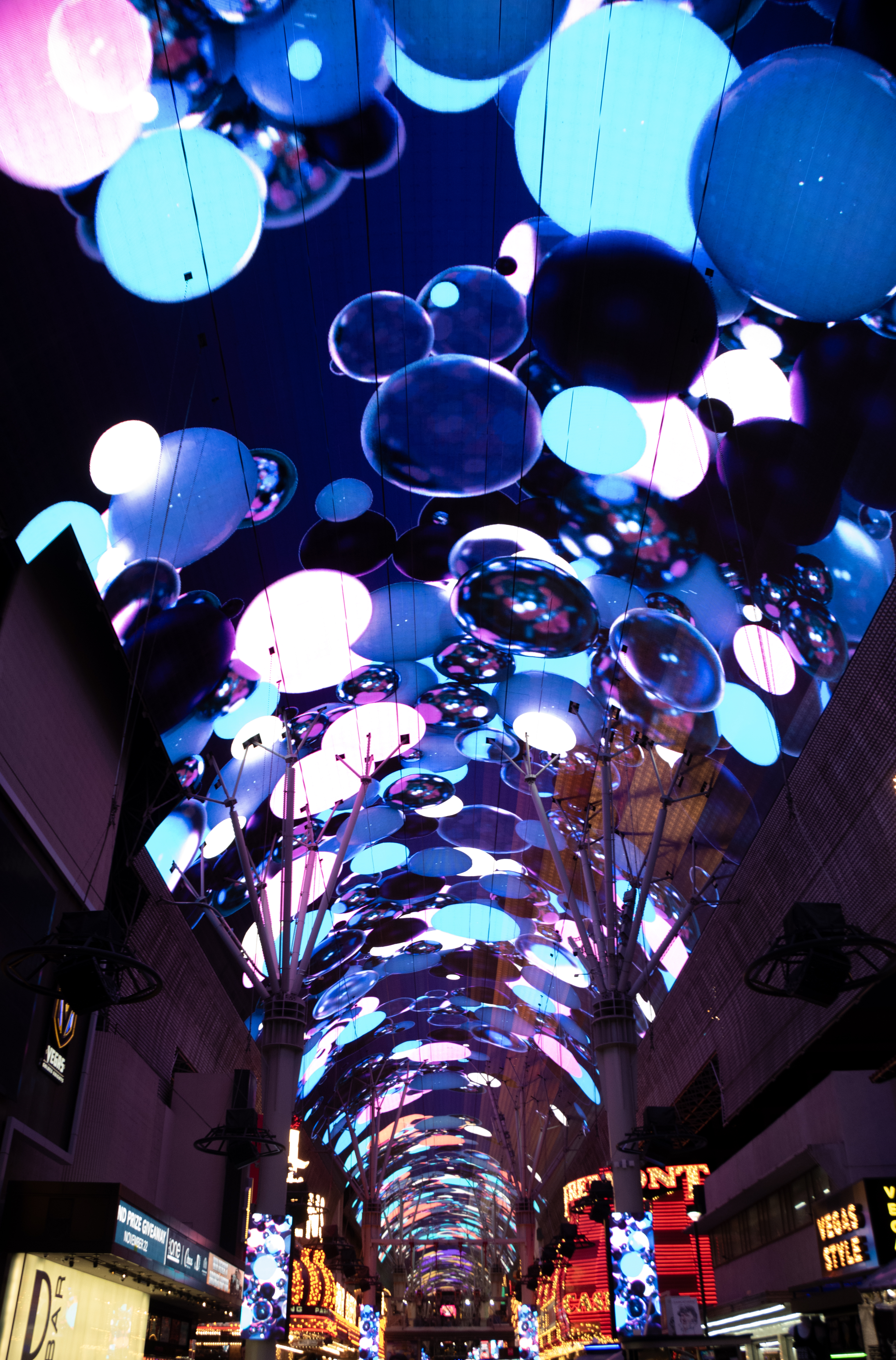
Fremont Street light canopy during nighttime in 2025

The LED display "canopy" that encompasses the Viva Vision show runs along the Fremont Street Experience promenade from Main Street to Fourth Street. Holding the canopy aloft are 16 columns, each weighing 26,000 pounds and can hold up 400,000 pounds, and 43,000 struts.

The canopy, comprising 130,000 square feet of display space is the world's largest video screen. Originally, nearly 2.1 million incandescent lights were housed in the canopy. With the completion of a 2004 upgrade, more than 12 million LED lamps illuminate the overhead canopy. On December 31, 2019, a more advanced digital canopy was unveiled. Manufactured by Watchfire Signs, a Danville, Illinois-based company, the newest Viva Vision display is seven times brighter and four times the resolution of the previous LED version. With over 49 million energy-efficient LEDs and a brightness of 5,000 Nits, the new canopy can operate shows during daylight hours.

Within the canopy itself are 220 speakers powered by 550,000 watts of amplification. Light and sound shows are presented daily beginning at 6:00 p.m. through 2:00 a.m. on the Viva Vision video screen.

=== SlotZilla Zip Line ===
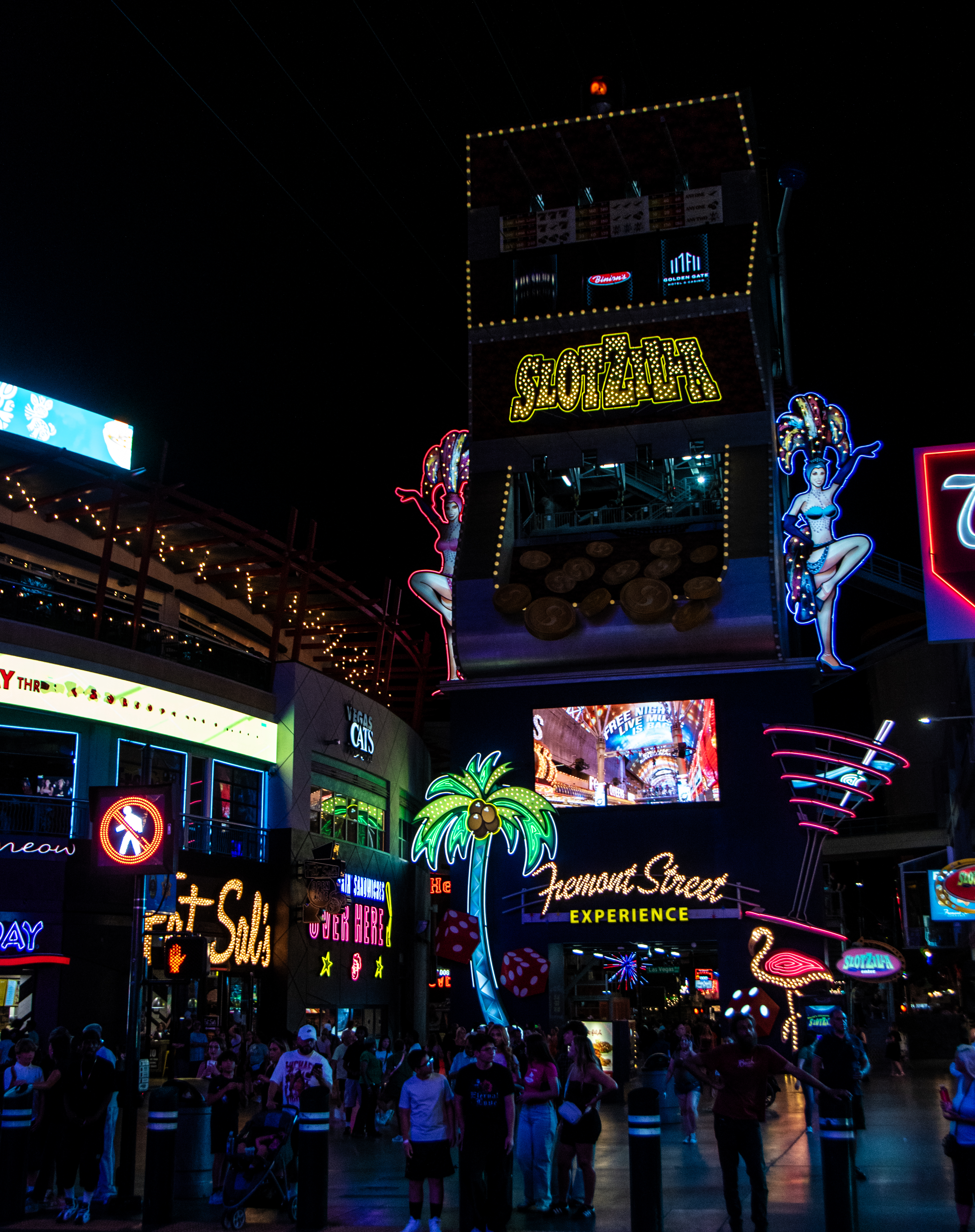
SlotZilla at the Fremont Street Experience

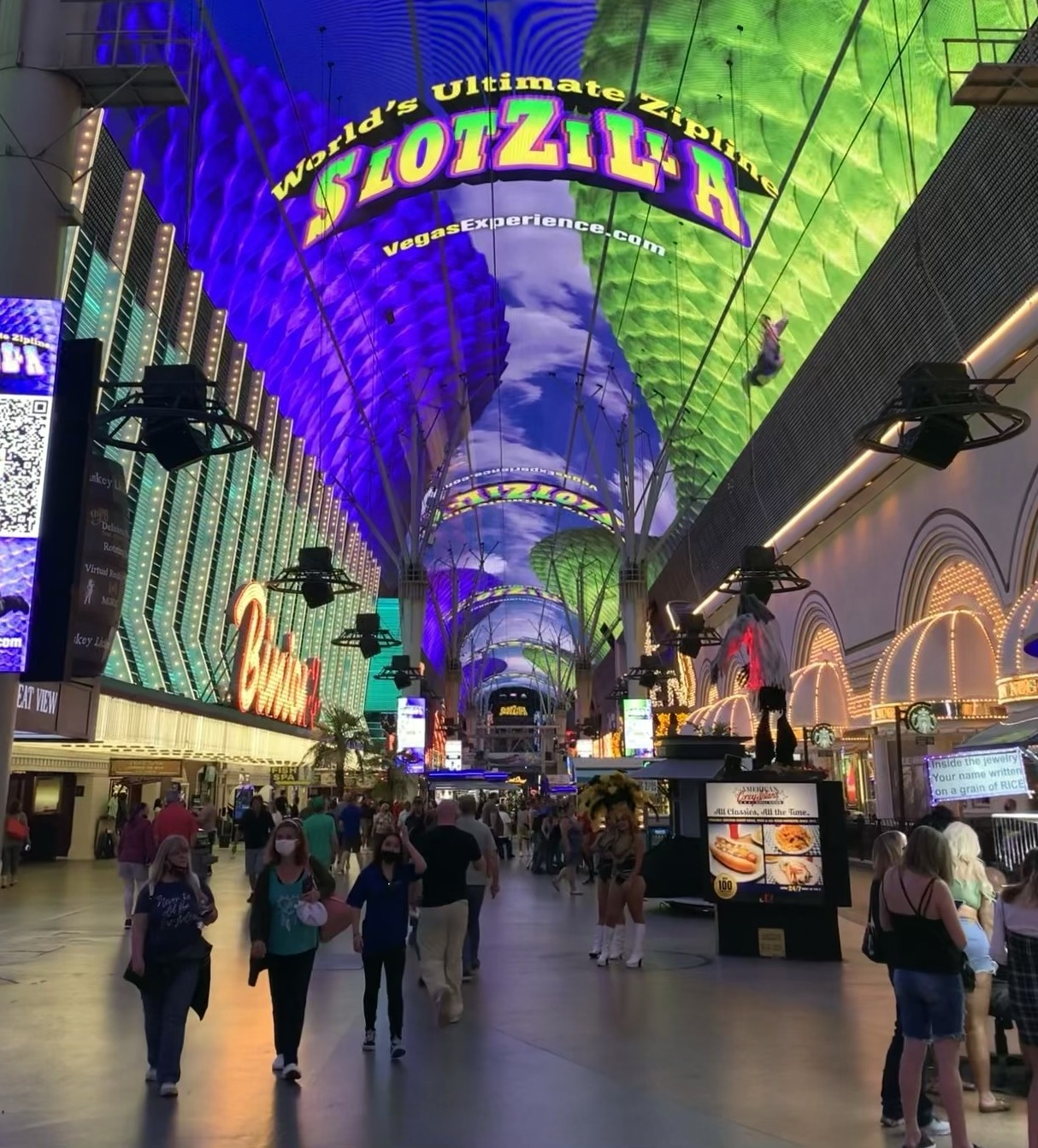
SlotZilla ziplines above the street

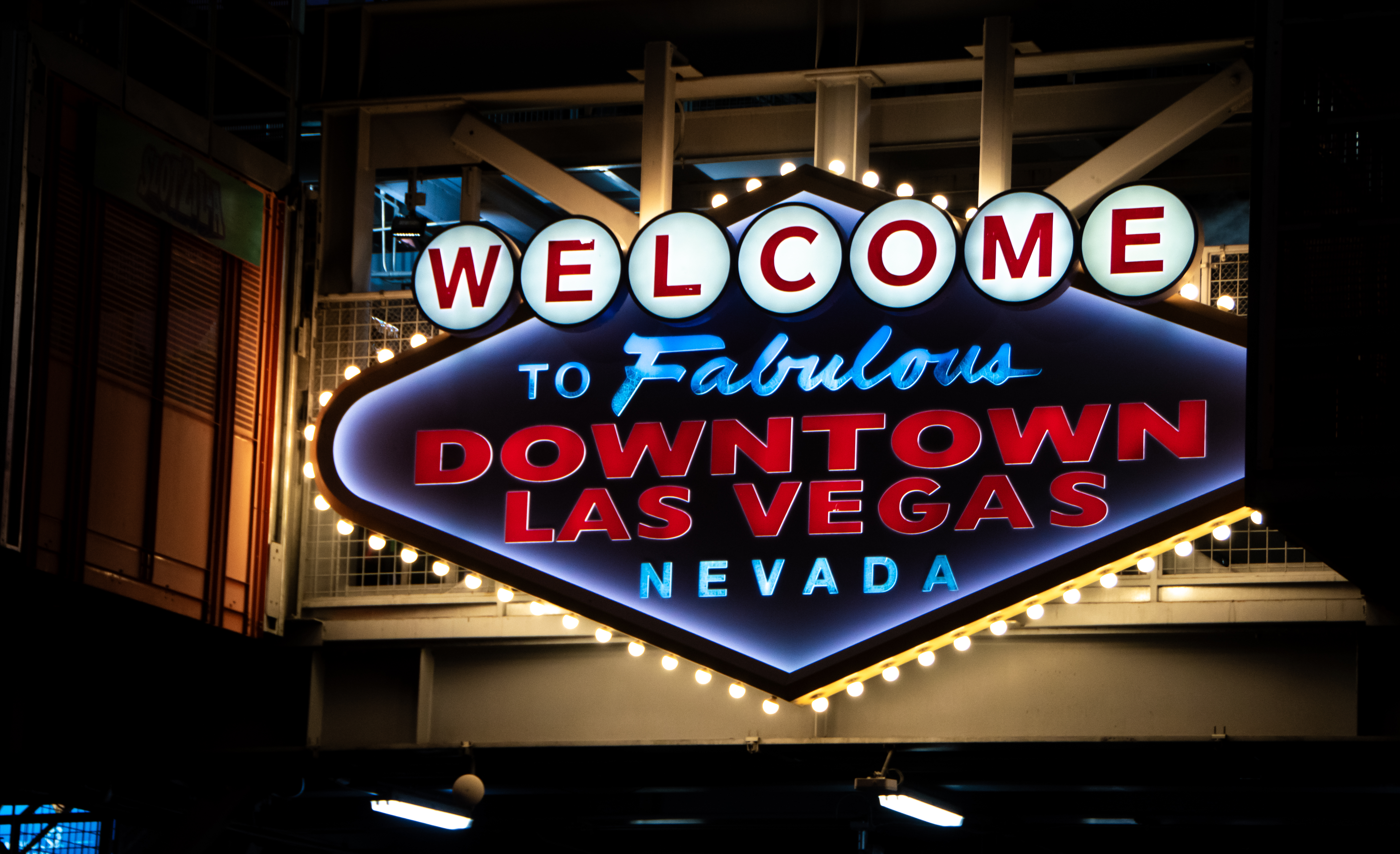
Welcome to Fabulous Downtown Las Vegas Nevada sign

SlotZilla at Fremont Street Experience is a 12-story, slot machine-inspired zip line attraction. SlotZilla offers "flyers" two levels of lines, the lower "Zipline" (77 feet up) and upper "Zoomline" (114 feet up). The lower lines travel halfway down the Fremont Street Experience pedestrian mall. The upper lines go the entire length of the mall (1,750 feet). Guests on the upper "Zoomline" travel prone, or "superhero-style". SlotZilla cost $17 million to construct and features a launch tower with over-sized dice, a martini glass, a pink flamingo, simulated video reels, a giant arm and two 37-foot-tall showgirls. One of the towers also bears a "Welcome to Fabulous Downtown Las Vegas" sign.

=== Pedestrian mall ===
Created when Fremont Street was closed permanently to vehicular traffic in September 1994. When the light and sound shows are not being presented, music is played throughout the mall. Nightly free entertainment is also provided, on three stages throughout the mall.

=== Parking plaza ===
A parking plaza is located at the eastern end of Fremont Street, owned and operated by Fremont Street Experience. The parking structure has roughly 1,430 spaces.

=== Neonopolis ===
Neonopolis is a shopping complex which operates independently from Fremont Street Experience. It is located at the end of the FSE pedestrian mall, where Las Vegas Boulevard South meets Fremont Street.

== Technical details ==
The initial display contained about 2.1 million light bulbs controlled by 32 computers located in kiosks on the mall. The sound system, using speakers suspended over the mall, was rated at 350,000 watts.

Displaying images that looked "real" took some innovation. New techniques were developed to make these curved, low-resolution images viewable from the ground. One adjustment was to move images slowly across the display to prevent blurring.

The 2001 upgrade to the sound system raised the power to 555,000 watts.

The 2004 upgrade features a 12.5-million LED display and more color combinations than the original display. The old control system was replaced by a central control room using 10 computers.

The 2019 upgrade features over 49.2 million LEDs with on-demand diagnostics through Watchfire Sign's proprietary digital signage software, which runs in sync with the Viva Vision canopy control software.

== FSE casino/hotels ==
Several casino/hotels are located on the Fremont Street Experience:

- Binion's Gambling Hall and Hotel
- Circa Resort & Casino
- The D Las Vegas
- Four Queens
- Fremont Hotel and Casino
- Golden Gate Hotel and Casino
- Golden Nugget Las Vegas

Former casinos include:

- La Bayou (closed in 2016)
- Las Vegas Club (closed in 2015)
- Mermaids Casino (closed in 2016)
- The Mint Las Vegas (closed in 1988; now part of Binion's)
- Pioneer Club Las Vegas (closed in 1995; now a gift shop)
- Carousel Hotel and Casino (closed in 1974)
- Apache Hotel and Casino (closed in 1941; now Binion's)
- Frontier Club Casino (closed in 1953)
- Boulder Club Casino (closed in 1960)
- Northern Club Casino (closed in 1942)

== Map ==
	Fremont Street
Main Street	Fremont Street	Main Street
Golden Gate	Fremont Street	Circa
Pioneer Club	Fremont Street
1st Street	Fremont Street	1st Street
Golden Nugget	Fremont Street	Binion's
Casino Center Blvd.	Fremont Street	Casino Center Blvd.
Four Queens	Fremont Street	Fremont Hotel-Casino
3rd Street	Fremont Street	3rd Street
The D	Fremont Street
4th Street	Fremont Street	4th Street
	Fremont Street	Neonopolis
Las Vegas Blvd.	Fremont Street	Las Vegas Blvd.

== See also ==
- Fremont East
- Vegas Vic
