= Pioneer Hotel & Gambling Hall =

Casino hotel in Nevada, United States

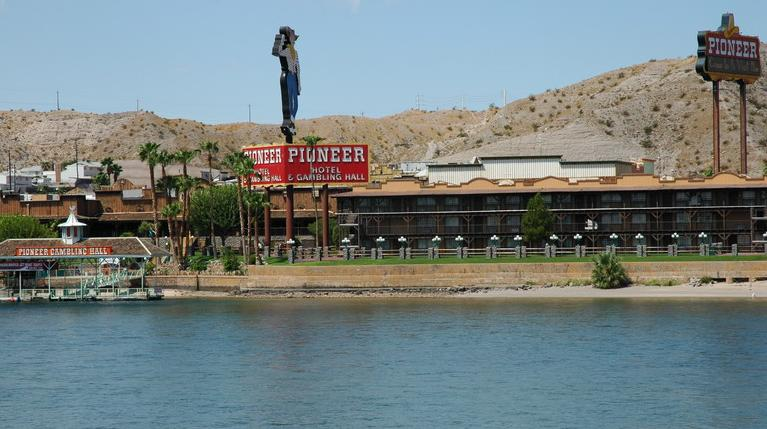
- Colorado River view of Pioneer in 2007
- Interactive map of Pioneer Hotel & Gambling Hall
- Location: Laughlin, Nevada, U.S.; 2200 South Casino Drive; 35.15541°N 114.57286°W
- Opened: 1979; 47 years ago
- Theme: Old West
- No. of rooms: 416
- Gaming space: 16,300 sq ft (1,510 m^{2})
- Owner: The New Pioneer, LLC
- Previous names: Colorado Club
- Website: Official website

Pioneer Hotel & Gambling Hall (formerly Colorado Club) is a hotel and casino located on the banks of the Colorado River in Laughlin, Nevada. It is known for its neon cigarette-puffing "River Rick" marque. It was a sister property of the Pioneer Club in Las Vegas until both properties were sold to separate parties.

== History ==
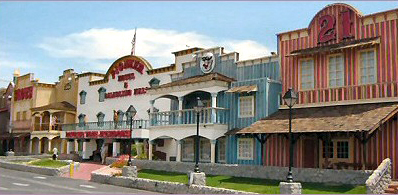
Roadside view of Pioneer in 2006

What would become the Pioneer Hotel & Gambling Hall initially opened in 1979 as the Colorado Club and was built by Tom Ward and Ed Nigro. In 1986, the casino had the distinction of being the first casino to open a players' club for slot players in Nevada.

The Hotel and Casino were purchased on January 9, 2004 by Archon Corporation. The current owners continue utilizing the western theme that has been the signature of The Pioneer Club since its inception. The casino added a new sports book, operated by Lucky's Race & Sports Book, in August 2009.

A new owner, The New Pioneer, LLC, assumed ownership on May 1, 2018. The casino closed at that time for "refurbishment." The casino reopened on August 30, 2018.

== River Rick ==
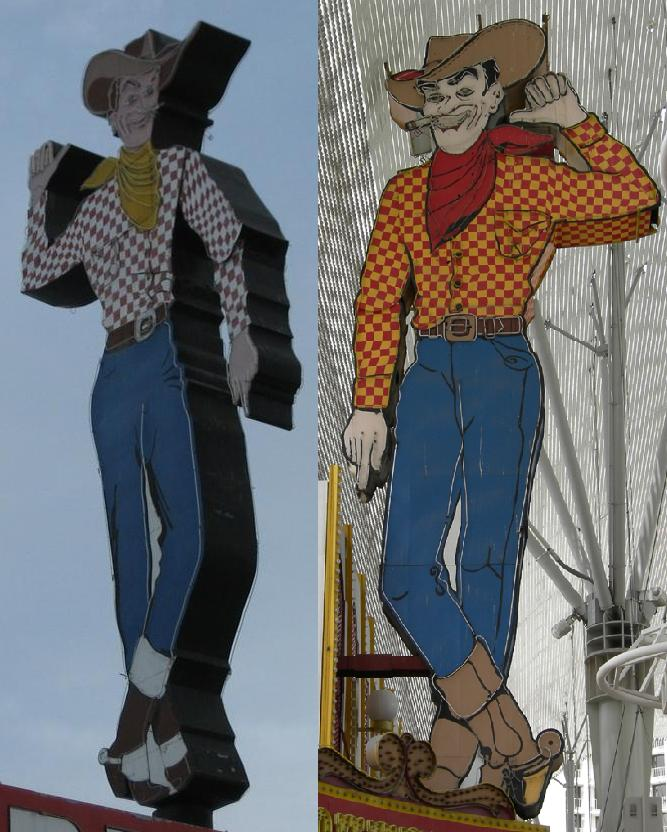
River Rick and Vegas Vic comparison

River Rick is the name of the neon sign that resembles a cowboy that was erected at the Pioneer Hotel & Gambling Hall in 1981. He is also referred to by some as Laughlin Lou, although the hotel itself calls him River Rick.

When Margaret Elardi, owner of the Pioneer Club in Las Vegas, bought the Pioneer Club Laughlin in 1981 she commissioned the River Rick neon sign to be built, which was an almost exact copy of Vegas Vic found at the Pioneer Club in Las Vegas at a cost of $1.5 million.

River Rick was built by the same sign company (Young Electric Sign Company) that made Vegas Vic 30 years prior.

River Rick is one of three neon cowboys in Nevada, the others being Vegas Vic and Wendover Will.
