= La Bayou =

Casino in Nevada, United States

Coordinates: 36.1712°N 115.1460°W

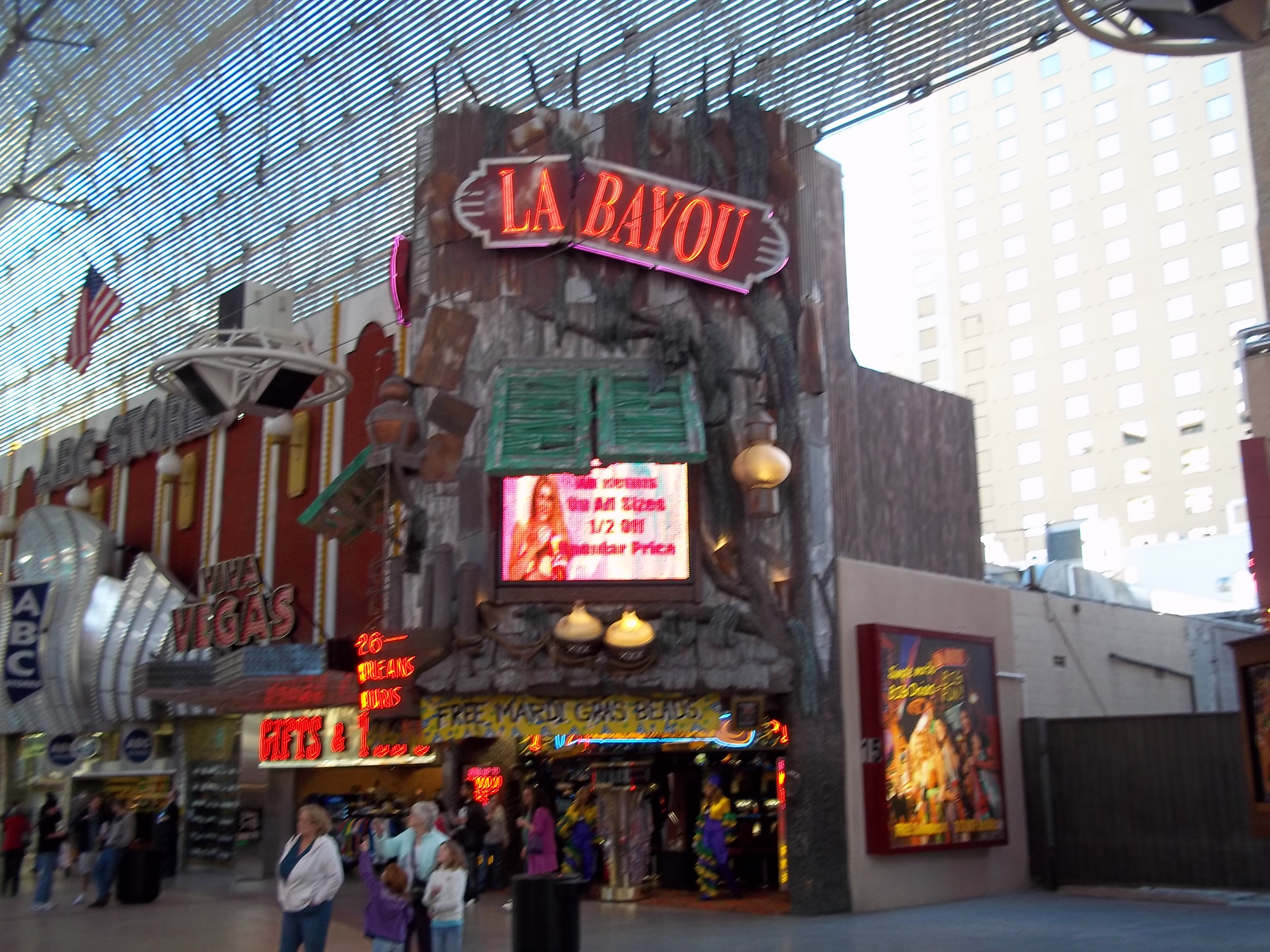
- Interactive map of La Bayou
- Location: Las Vegas, Nevada 89101; 15 East Fremont Street
- Opened: 1920
- Closed: June 27, 2016
- Theme: French
- Gaming space: 3,200 sq ft (300 m^{2})
- Casino type: Land-based
- Owner: Derek and Greg Stevens
- Previous names: Northern Club; Monte Carlo; Coin Castle
- Renovated in: 2000

La Bayou was a casino located on the Fremont Street Experience in Downtown Las Vegas, Nevada.

The casino had 3,200 square feet (300 m^{2}) of gaming space with 125 slot machines. By the time of its closing, La Bayou was one of the few casinos in Las Vegas where slot machines paid out in coins, rather than vouchers.

== History ==
=== Northern Club: 1920-43 ===
The business opened in 1913 as the Las Vegas Coffee House.

In 1920 Mayme Stocker renamed it the Northern Club, offering liquor and gambling when both were illegal, during the Prohibition era. "Northern" was a well-known code word among railroad workers for an establishment serving alcohol.

On March 20, 1931, the Northern Club received the first Nevada gaming license. This was also the first gaming license issued to a woman, Mayme Stocker.

By 1941, Bugsy Siegel and Dave Stearns were operating the club.

=== Turf Club, Monte Carlo Club, 1940s-1960s ===
In 1943, Turf Club replaced Northern Club. It ran only until 1945 when Wilbur Clark leased the club, renaming it the Monte Carlo Club. The Stockers continued to run the Northern Hotel on the second floor until 1949. Monte Carlo Club would close in 1956, but remain in business as a bar until the 1960s. The original building was razed after 1965. A new building was erected, where a Denny's diner opened c. 1967–1968, followed by Sam's Roast Beef c. 1968–1969.

=== Coin Castle: 1970-99 ===
By 1970, the site was operating as the Coin Castle. Herb Pastor was approved to take over the Coin Castle and the nearby Golden Goose casino in 1977. Pastor would later also own the nearby Sassy Sally's casino and the Girls of Glitter Gulch strip club.

=== La Bayou: 1999-2016 ===
Pastor decided in 1999 to move ahead with a renovation plan to transform the Coin Castle and Sassy Sally's into La Bayou and Mermaids, respectively, for a total of $6 million.

In 2006, Pastor's son, Steve Burnstine, purchased the two casinos and the strip club.

=== Closing: 2016 ===
In April 2016, Derek and Greg Stevens, owners of the neighboring Golden Gate and Las Vegas Club casinos, purchased the three properties, and announced that the businesses would close on June 27. It was razed soon after. The Golden Gate's expansion into the former space opened at noon on August 25, 2017.
