= Fremont Street =

Thoroughfare in Las Vegas, United States

Coordinates: 36°09′35″N 115°07′07″W

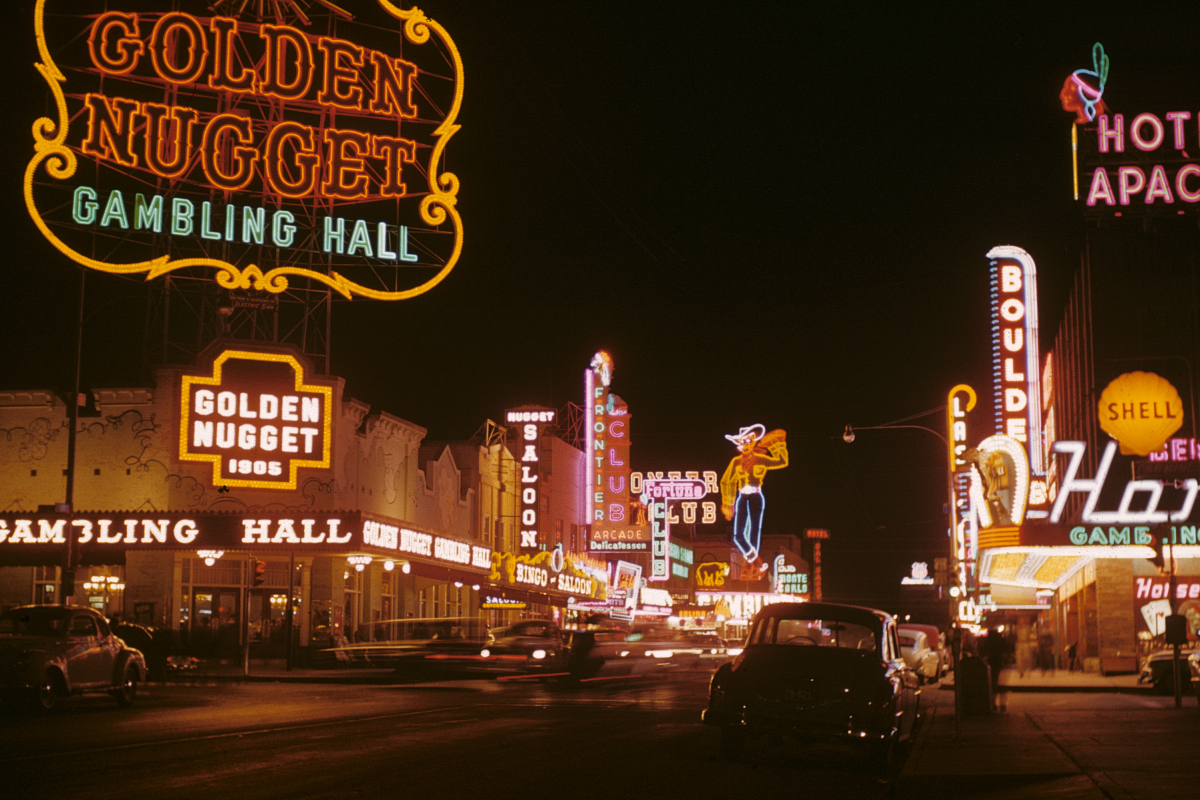
- Fremont Street in 1952

Route information
- Existed: 1905–present

Major junctions
- West end: Main Street / Fremont Street Experience in Las Vegas
- Las Vegas Boulevard in Las Vegas; Eastern Avenue in Las Vegas; Charleston Boulevard in Las Vegas
- East end: SR 582 (Boulder Highway) / Sahara Avenue in Las Vegas

Fremont Street (often referred to as the Old Vegas Strip) is a street in downtown Las Vegas, Nevada that is the second-most famous street in both the Las Vegas Valley and in the state of Nevada, after the Las Vegas Strip. It is named in honor of explorer and politician John C. Frémont. Located in the heart of the Downtown casino corridor, Fremont Street is today, or was, the address for many famous casinos such as Binion's Horseshoe, Eldorado Club, Fremont Hotel and Casino, Golden Nugget, Four Queens, The Mint, and the Pioneer Club and the longest-running casino in Las Vegas, Golden Gate Hotel and Casino.

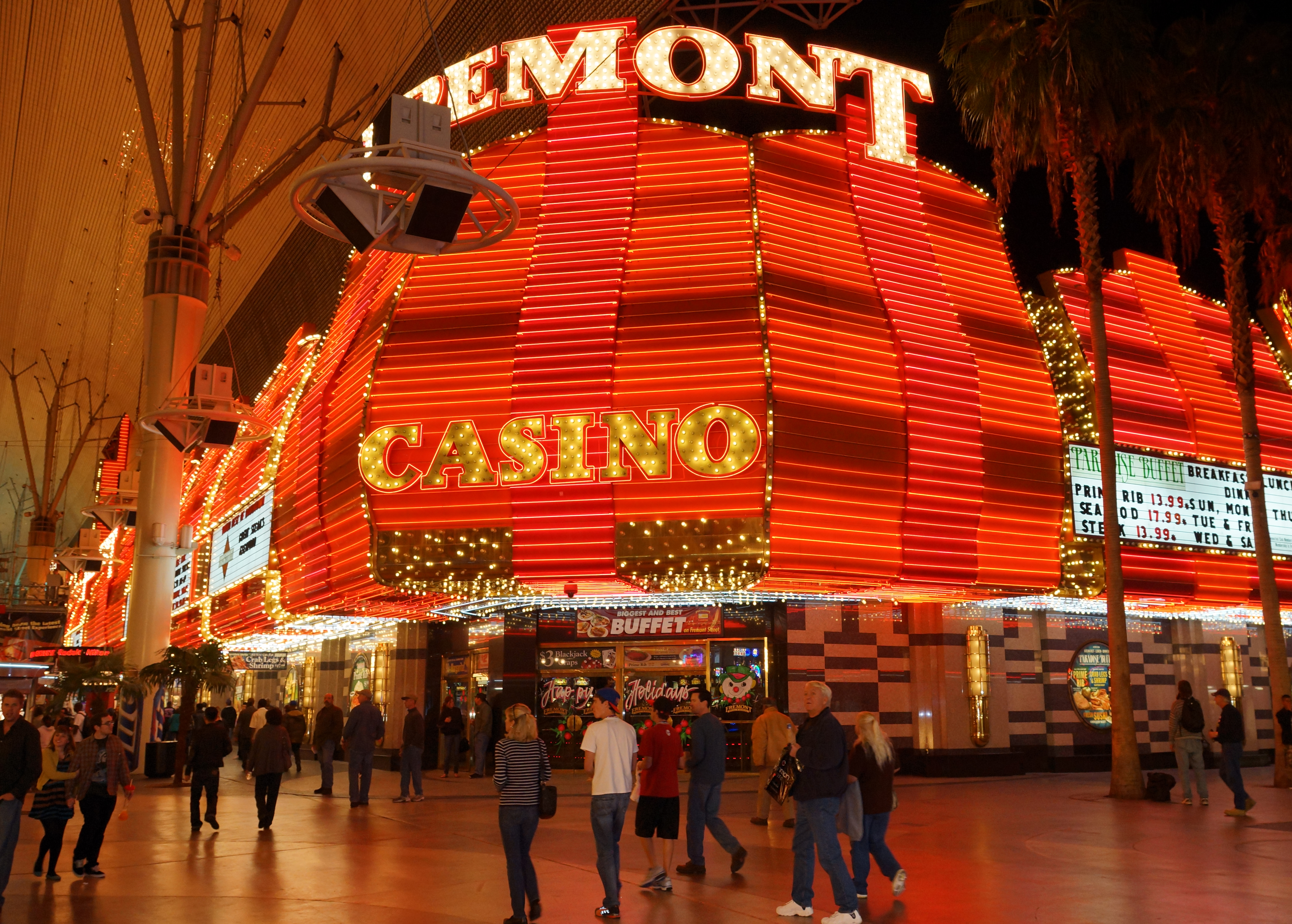
Fremont Hotel & Casino, Las Vegas

Prior to the construction of the Fremont Street Experience, the western end of Fremont Street was the representative scene for Las Vegas that was included in virtually every television show and movie that wanted to depict the glittery lights of Las Vegas. The abundance of neon signs, like cowboy Vegas Vic, earned the street the nickname of "Glitter Gulch".

Fremont Street is designated between Main Street and Sahara Avenue in a northwest–southeast direction, although auto traffic actually begins at Las Vegas Boulevard. At Sahara, it leaves Las Vegas proper and continues as Boulder Highway. Fremont Street formerly carried several national highways, including U.S. Route 93 (US 93), US 95, and US 466. US 93 and US 95 have been rerouted along Interstate 515 (now-Interstate 11), while US 466 has been decommissioned. The section of Fremont Street east of the Fremont East District is currently designated Nevada State Route 582.

Although prostitution in Nevada is legal in some counties; it has been illegal in Clark County since 1971; nonetheless, the street has a reputation for prostitution.

== History ==
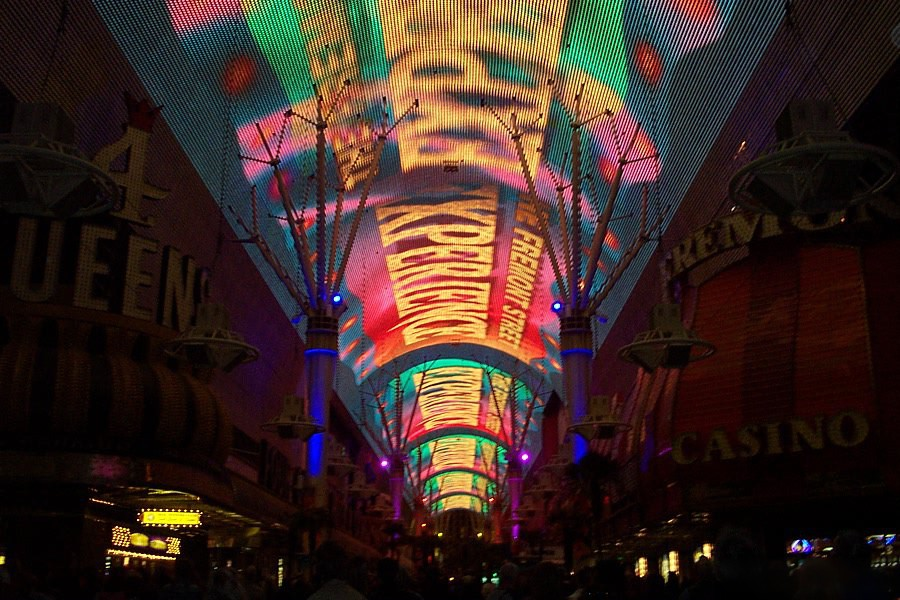
Fremont Street's illuminated "Space Frame"

Fremont Street dates back to 1905, when Las Vegas itself was founded. Fremont Street was the first paved street in Las Vegas in 1925 and received the city's first traffic light in 1931. Fremont Street also carried the shields of U.S. Route 93 (US 93), US 95, and US 466 before the construction of the interstate freeways, including I-15.

While gambling was established prior to being legalized, the Northern Club in 1931 received one of the first six gambling licenses issued in Nevada, and the first one for Fremont Street.

Glitter Gulch on Fremont Street, was closed to vehicle traffic in September, 1994, to begin construction on the Fremont Street Experience.

=== Film and media history ===
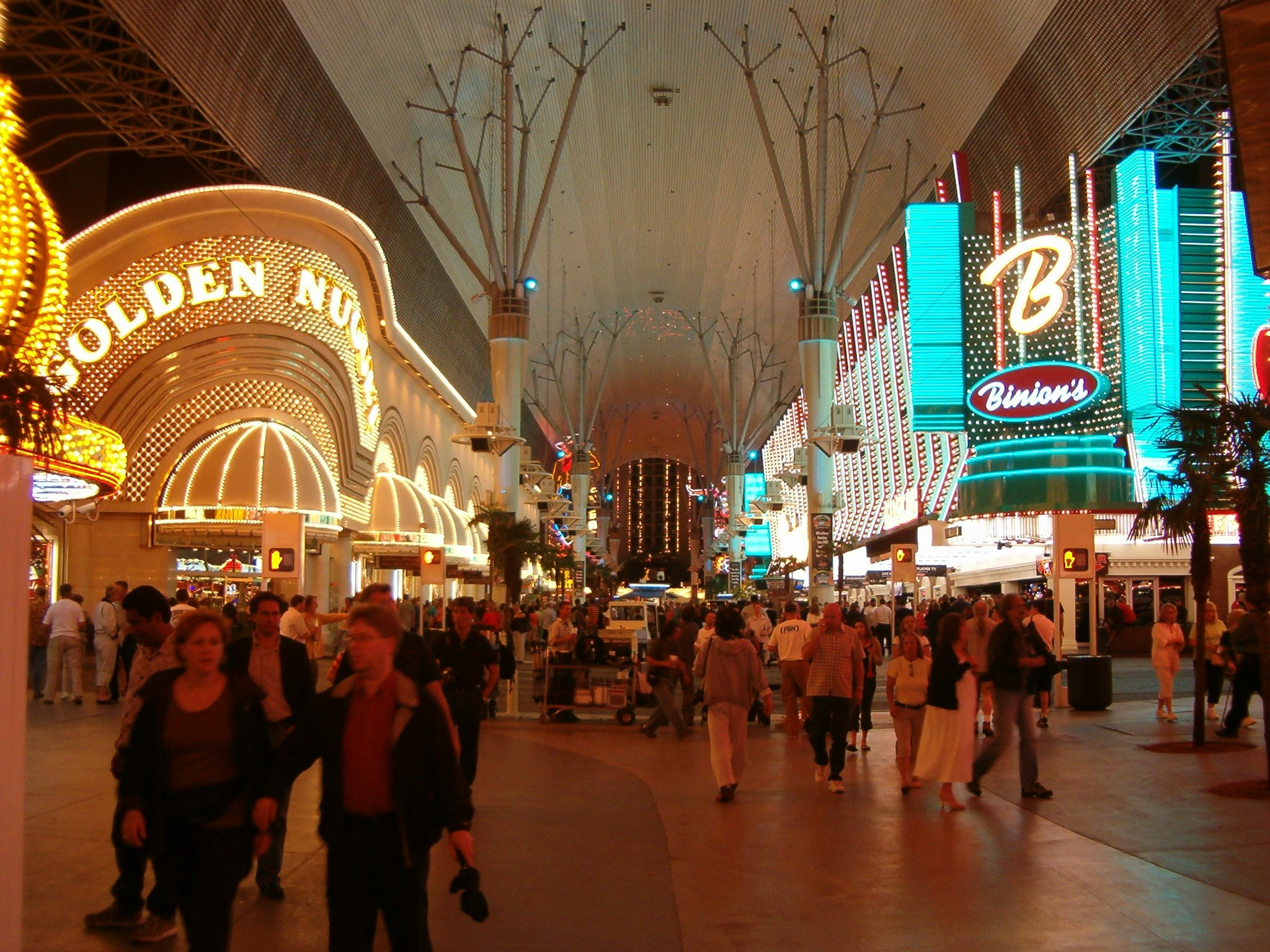
The Golden Nugget and Binion's casinos at night

- The 1950 Charlton Heston film Dark City features a walk along Fremont Street.
- The 1964 Elvis Presley film Viva Las Vegas featured nighttime footage of Fremont Street during the opening credits.
- The 1971 James Bond film Diamonds Are Forever featured a chase scene in which James Bond, running from Las Vegas police, side-rolls a car through an alley exiting onto Fremont Street.
- The 1978–81 ABC television series Vega$, starring Robert Urich, had its episode intro, and many scenes, filmed on Fremont Street.
- The music video for Diana Ross' 1981 cover of Why Do Fools Fall in Love features Ross dancing and running along Fremont Street, with her fans lined up on the sidewalks.
- The 1987 music video for the song "I Still Haven't Found What I'm Looking For" by U2 was filmed on Fremont Street and featured the band members wandering around, while The Edge played an acoustic guitar.
- In the 1987 anthology film Aria, one of the segments involves two young lovers driving down Fremont Street before attempting suicide.
- The second season of the NBC show Crime Story (1986–1988) featured Fremont Street in its opening credits, and nearly all the action took place there, as opposed to the Strip.
- In the 1991 arcade release of Street Fighter II and 1998's console release of Street Fighter Alpha 3, the Golden Nugget, would serve as Balrog's home turf as the stage "Las Vegas". The stage returned in 2016's Street Fighter V as part of the game's first DLC pack as "High Roller Casino". Here, the titular Golden Nugget was renamed to "Golden Bullion: Shadaloo Hall", presumably to avoid copyright litigation.
- 1992's Honey, I Blew Up the Kid prominently featured Fremont Street in the movie.
- 1992's Cool World showed all the animation coming out of the Plaza Casino and going down Fremont Street.
- In 1994, Glitter Gulch was featured prominently in the TV miniseries The Stand.
- The 1997 comedy Vegas Vacation includes a few scenes on Fremont Street.
- The Flaming Lips filmed part of their video for "Do You Realize??" in Fremont Street
- 1998's Very Bad Things featured Fremont Street in the movie.
- In the 2004 movie Dodgeball: A True Underdog Story, Steve the Pirate is seen along the Plaza near the Fremont Street Experience.
- In a 2005 release, Panic! at the Disco released a song about Fremont Street called "Build God, Then We'll Talk".
- The 2007 film Next has Nicolas Cage's character entering the Golden Nugget from the Fremont Street Experience.
- Ice Cube's music video for "Chrome and Paint" took place on Fremont Street, with Ice Cube in a lowrider.
- In Tom Clancy's Rainbow Six: Vegas, Logan Keller, and his teammates Jung, and Michael infiltrate Fremont Street to find a news van, which they find by going through the maintenance tunnels under the Sirocco Casino, the game's version of the Binion Hotel and Gambling Hall.
- Heavily referenced in the Tom Waits song "Mr. Siegal".
- The series CSI: Crime Scene Investigation featured several episodes that included scenes on Fremont Street.
- Magician and illusionist Criss Angel has done many demonstrations there.
- Featured in The Real World: Las Vegas (2011). Several cast members ziplined across the Fremont Street Experience in an episode.
- The 2012 series Vegas features several scenes on historic Fremont Street (though filming took place in Las Vegas, New Mexico)
- The area is featured in the 2013 comedy The Incredible Burt Wonderstone, when a street magician (Jim Carrey) performs his magic tricks before two of the main characters, played by Steve Carell and Steve Buscemi.
- Fremont Street is featured intermittently throughout the 2013 comedy Last Vegas, starting with the main quartet (Robert De Niro, Michael Douglas, Morgan Freeman and Kevin Kline) arriving at Binion's Gambling Hall and Hotel.
- A destroyed rendition of Fremont Street appears in the 2010 post-apocalyptic RPG, Fallout: New Vegas. The area in-game is known as 'Freeside' and is a slum.
- The Weeknd filmed a music video for his 2019 songs "Heartless" and "Blinding Lights" on Fremont Street.
- The 2024 film Anora was filmed at the Fremont Street Experience.

== Fremont East ==
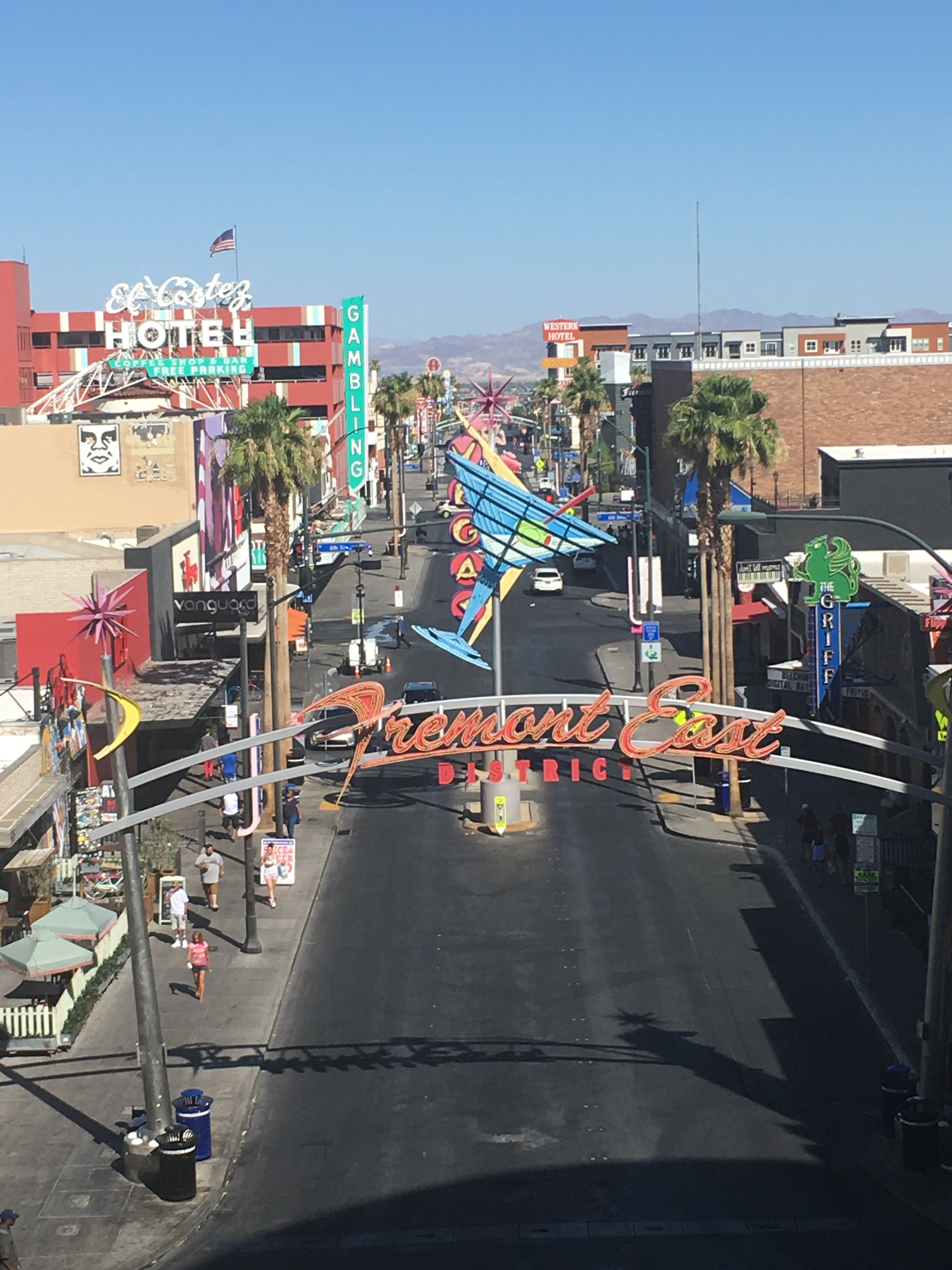
The Fremont East Entertainment District.

In 2002, the city of Las Vegas created the Fremont East Entertainment District (FEED), an entertainment district in the heart of Downtown Las Vegas. In 2004, the city announced plans to redevelop a three-block section of Fremont Street east of the Fremont Street Experience as an arts and entertainment area within FEED. The $5.5 million four-story high "streetscapes" improvement project was a public–private partnership with 50% paid by landlords via new businesses and 50% paid with tax dollars as part of a plans to revitalize Downtown Las Vegas. The area was redesigned to increase the draw to Downtown, with a compact entertainment area of bars and clubs.

The three-block renovation included pedestrian-friendly street redesign, landscaping, and retro-looking new neon signage. It also included four vintage Vegas neon signs in the street median, built new but reminiscent of classic Las Vegas signs. Fremont East street improvements opened officially in between June and September 2007.

As of September 2025, the Fremont East Entertainment District comprises six blocks. The boundaries are (clockwise, beginning at the east) Las Vegas Boulevard, Ogden Avenue, 8th Street, and Carson Avenue. The historic El Cortez hotel and casino are within the district, as was the staple cocktail bar Downtown Cocktail Room (June 2007–November 2024). Beyond this district on Fremont Street lies the bulk of Tony Hsieh's DTP, formerly Downtown Project.

== Gallery ==
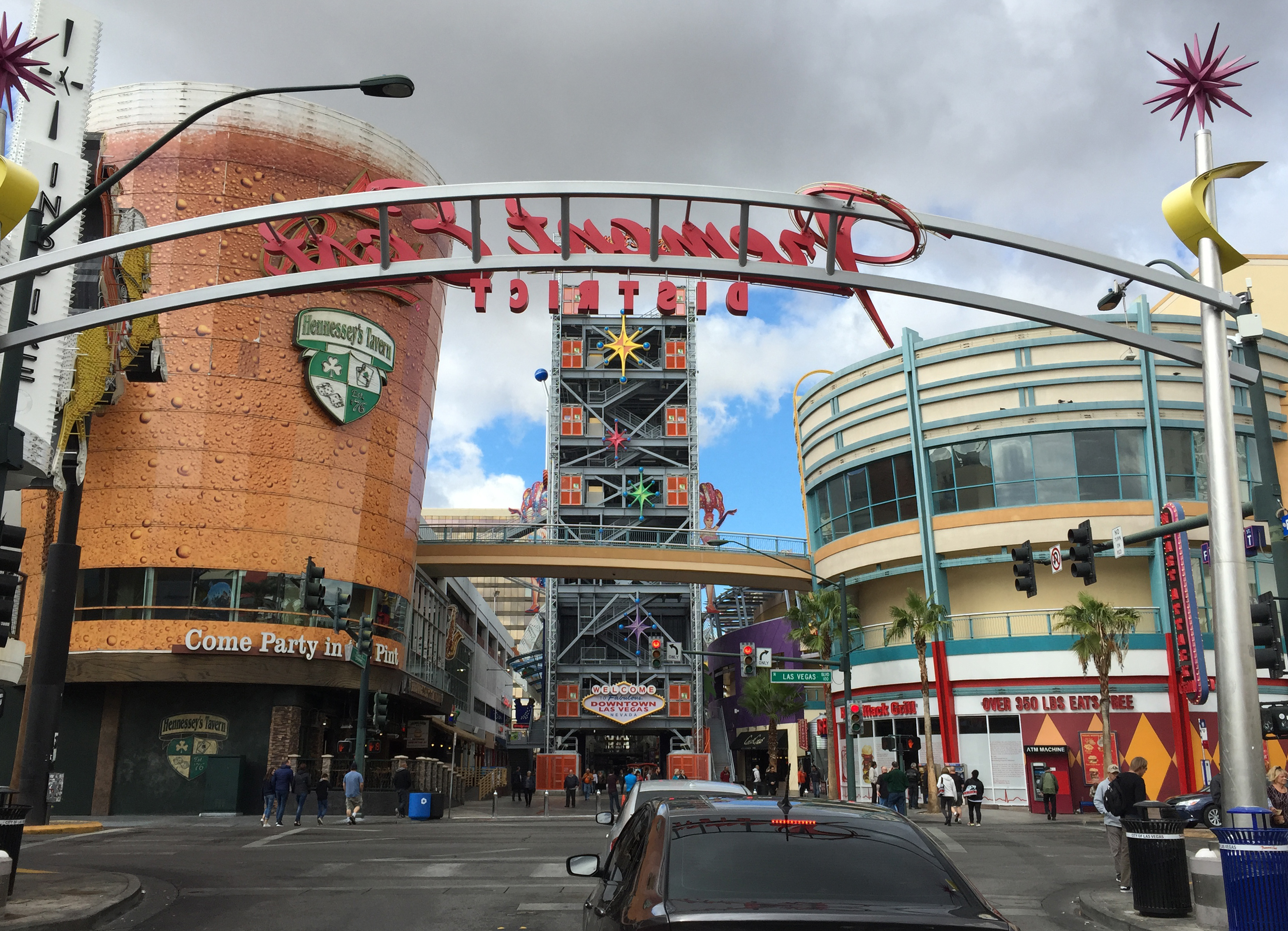
View northwest along Fremont Street at Las Vegas Boulevard

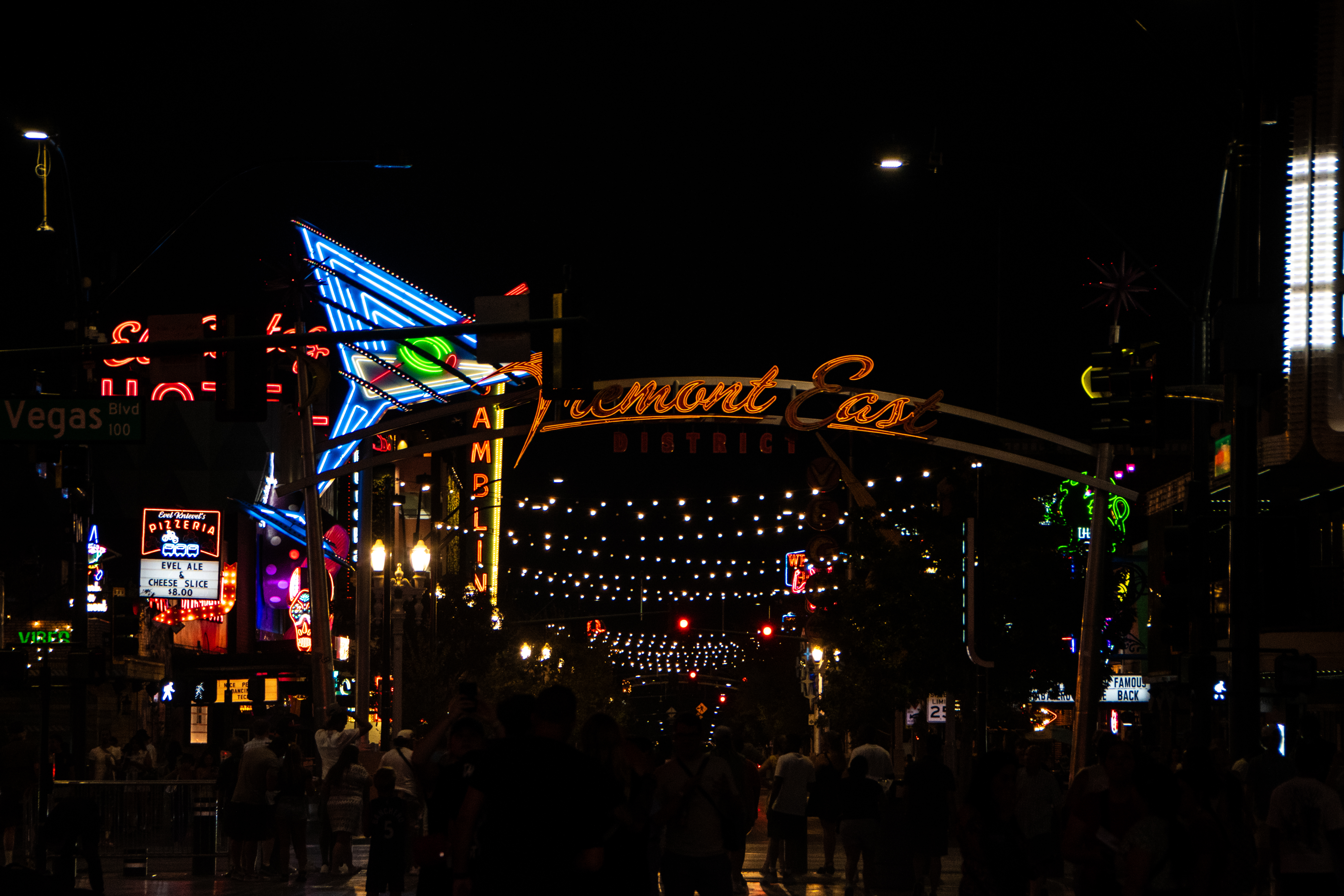
Fremont East in 2025

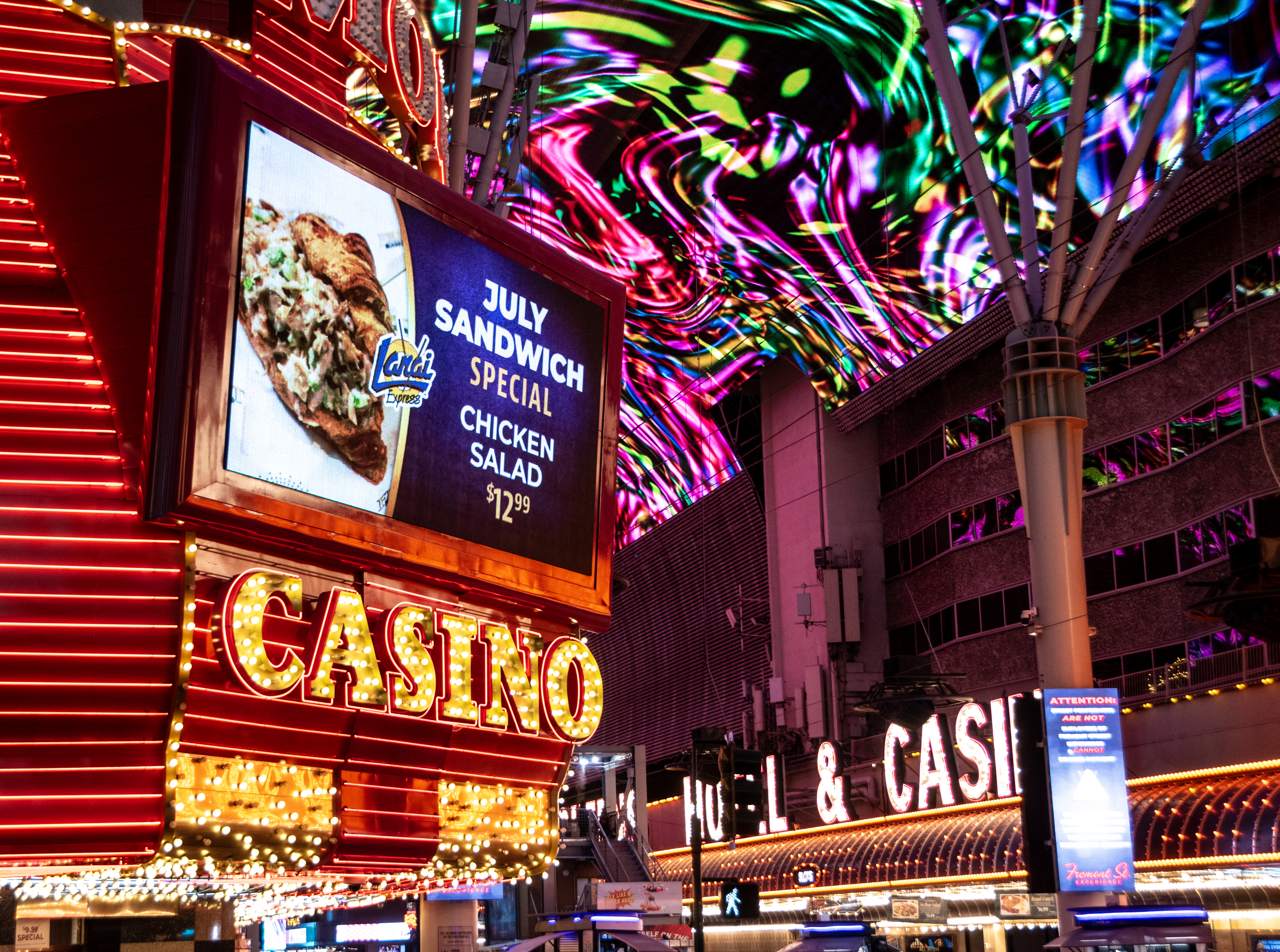
The Fremont Street Experience, 2025

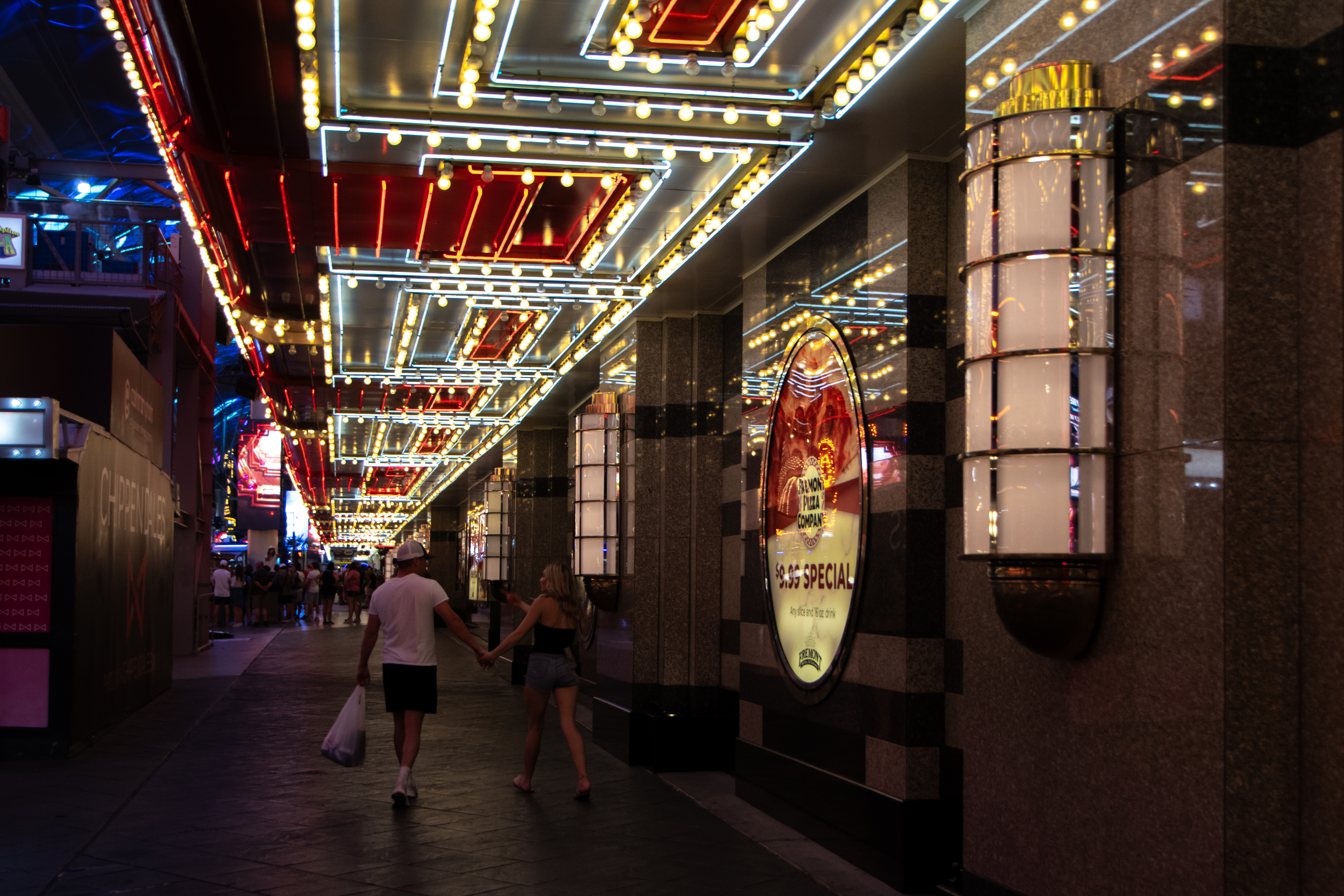
Side of the Fremont Street Experience, 2025
