= Mermaids Casino =

Demolished casino in Downtown Las Vegas

Coordinates: 36.1714°N 115.1450°W

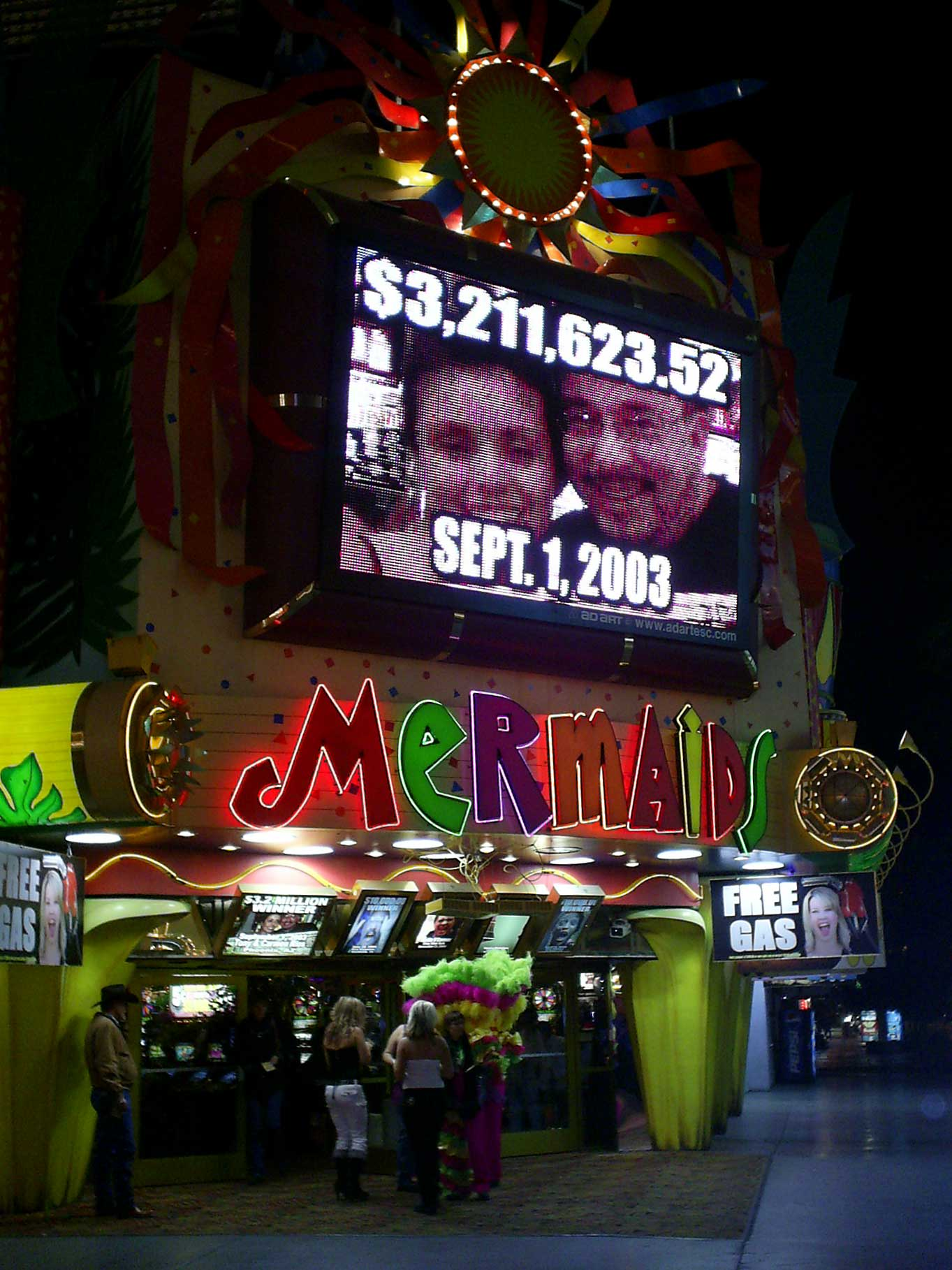
- Interactive map of Mermaids Casino
- Location: Downtown Las Vegas; 32 East Fremont Street
- Opened: May 25, 1956
- Closed: June 27, 2016
- Theme: Tropical
- Gaming space: 7,000 sq ft (650 m^{2})
- Casino type: Land-Based
- Owner: Derek and Greg Stevens
- Previous names: Silver Palace; Carousel; Gamblers Hall of Fame; Sundance West; Sassy Sally's

Mermaids Casino was a casino located on the Fremont Street Experience in Downtown Las Vegas, Nevada.

The casino's only gaming options were slot and video poker machines.

== History ==
=== Silver Palace (1956-64) ===
When the Silver Palace casino opened in the summer of 1956, it was the first two-level club in Las Vegas, and the escalator, connecting the casino with the lower-level restaurant, was the first in Southern Nevada.

=== Various name changes (1964-1999) ===
The Silver Palace gave way to Carousel Casino in July 1964, followed by Gambler's Hall of Fame Casino in 1974. In 1976 the property became Sundance West, followed by Sassy Sally's in 1980.

=== Mermaids Casino (1999-2016) ===
In 1999, owner Herb Pastor decided to move ahead with a renovation plan to transform it into Mermaids, and renovate his nearby Coin Castle casino into La Bayou, for a total of $6 million.

In 2006, Pastor sold the two casinos and his neighboring strip club to his son, Steve Burnstine.

=== Closing (2016) ===
In April 2016, Derek and Greg Stevens, owners of the neighboring Golden Gate, the D, and Las Vegas Club casinos, purchased the four properties (Mermaids Casino, La Bayou Casino, Glitter Gulch Gentleman's Club plus the corporate office located at 111 N. 1st Street) and announced that the businesses would close on June 27. It was demolished over the course of 2017 along with the Las Vegas Club and the Glitter Gulch strip club to make way for the Circa Resort & Casino, which opened in December 2020.
