= Peppermill =

Peppermill or peppermills may refer to:

- Pepper grinder
- Peppermill (restaurant) in Winchester, Nevada
- Peppermill Reno in Reno, Nevada
- Peppermill Wendover in West Wendover, Nevada
- Peppermills (1997 film)
- Peppermill restaurant in Nieuwerkerken, Limburg, Belgie
