= Pat Denner =

American designer most famous for Vegas Vic

Pat Denner (1924 – September 25, 2011) was the designer of the iconic Las Vegas neon sign known as Vegas Vic.

Denner was raised in Salt Lake City, and studied commercial drawing and design at the Pratt Institute in New York City.

In 1951, the Young Electric Sign Company in Salt Lake City commissioned Denner to design an illustration for the manufacturing of the neon sign. He also was commissioned to design Wendover Will for The Stateline Casino in West Wendover, Nevada in 1952.

Denner also designed in 1952 the first seat-down menus for Harman Restaurants, home of the KFC in Salt Lake City and then created the likeness of Col. Harland Sanders for the menus and posterity. Back then the franchise was not established and Harman Restaurants had only two locations in Salt Lake City.

The 1950s were productive and creative for Denner as an art director and graphic designer. From his studio at Denner & Associates located at the corner of Main and Broadway in Salt Lake City, he handled many of the prestigious accounts of those days, such as Walker Bank, Equitable Oil Company, Auerbachs Stores, Harman Restaurants, Dee Restaurants and others. Mr. Denner created oils, watercolors and portraiture for many selected clients like the U.S. Ski and Snowboard Association in Park City and others from his storefront studio in Salt Lake City, Utah. Pat Denner died September 25, 2011 in Salt Lake City, Utah at the age of 87.

Mr. Denner was the subject of a documentary, Howdy Pardner! (directed by George Leon - 2007), which is described as being "about Americana, iconography, outdoor advertising, graphic design and its influence in the popular culture".
