= Red Garter Casino =

Casino hotel in Nevada, United States

Coordinates: 40.738604°N 114.066163°W

Red Garter

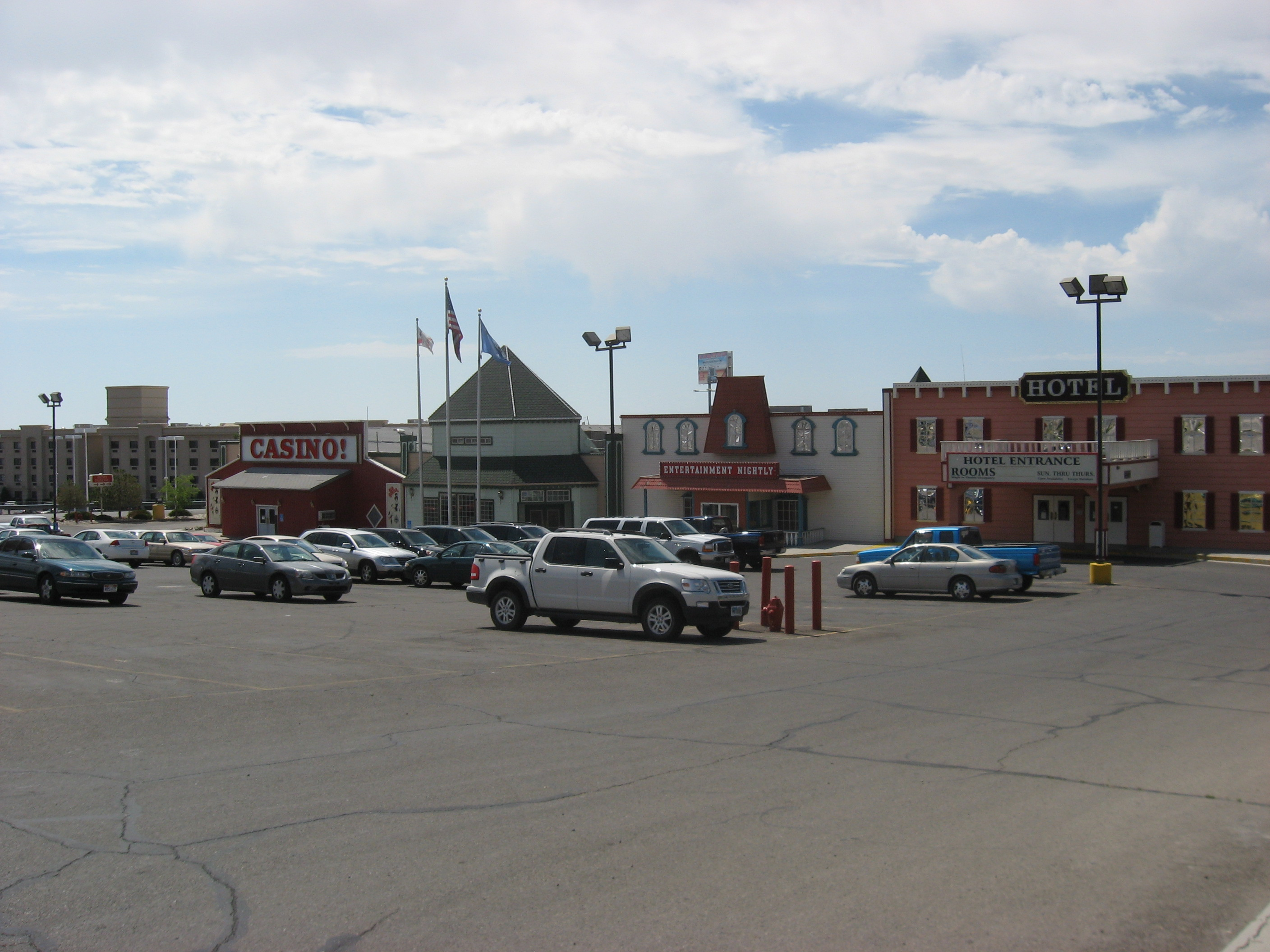
- Interactive map of Red Garter
- Location: West Wendover; 1225 Wendover Boulevard
- Opened: 1983; 43 years ago
- No. of rooms: 187
- Gaming space: 12,500
- Casino type: Land-based
- Owner: Maverick Gaming
- Website: redgarterwendover.com

Red Garter is a hotel and casino located in West Wendover, Nevada just west of Rainbow Casino. As of 2022, the Red Garter Hotel remained operated by Maverick Gaming, which is based in Kirkland, Washington.

== History ==
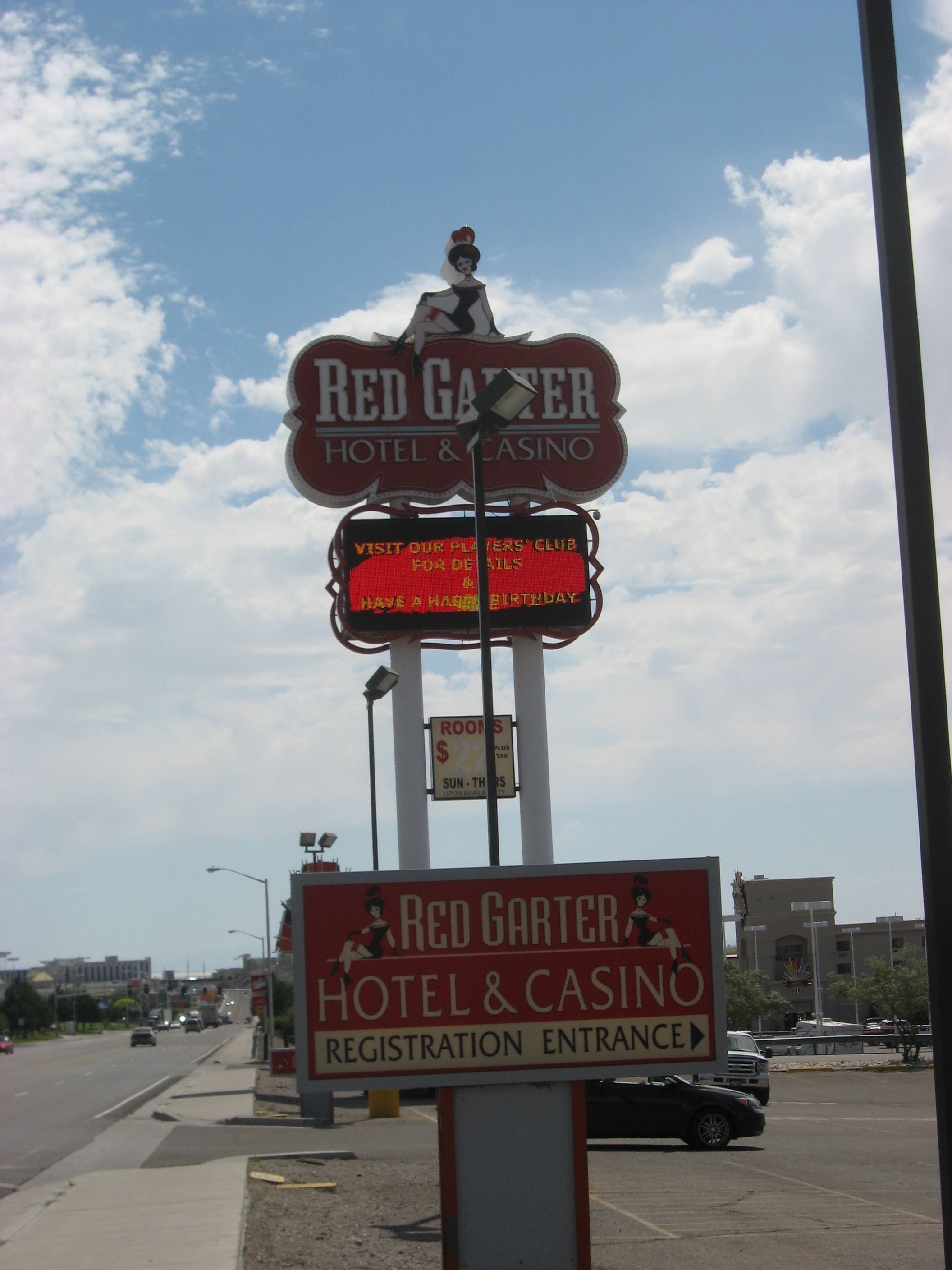
Sign in front of the Red Garter

Red Garter was originally a smaller casino with a connecting Super 8 motel adjacent to it. Red Garter began operation in 1983. In 2004 Holder Hospitality Group purchased the casino from Full House Inc. and retained its current management and staff.

As of January 2009 it employed 155 people.

With changes in the economy, the gambling industry experienced major losses, and in January 2009, it was announced that the Red Garter was to be closed on March 3. However, the casino remained open and continued operations under the Holder Group.

On February 19, 2010, the Holder Hospitality Group filed for bankruptcy protection for the Red Garter Casino. The following Tuesday, February 23, 2010, the casino was sold to the owners of the Wendover Nugget casino. The primary owner became David A. Ensign, half-brother of Senator John Ensign.

Following guidelines from the Nevada Gaming Commission and Control Board, Red Garter Hotel & Casino and other West Wendover casinos reopened on June 11, 2020. After two months of emptiness, some slot machines and table games remained closed. As of 2022, the Red Garter Hotel remained operated by Maverick Gaming.

In July 2025, Maverick Gaming filed for bankruptcy protection due to corporate financing problems. However, Red Garter and its other Nevada properties are not the focus of the filing and will remain operational.

In December 2025, Red Garter Hotel & Casino was indefinitely closed due to flooding, but reopened in April 2026.

== Features ==
Red Garter underwent renovations in 2010 (while remaining open), and afterwards offered 9 single deck Royal Match Blackjack tables, 1 Double Zero Roulette, 1 Three Card Poker table, and 1 Craps table. A new slot floor was added featuring a new players card system and ticket in/out systems. The interior of the casino had major improvements, including a new hotel registration desk, a new gift shop, new restrooms, and new carpet throughout the casino.

The property contains 187 guest rooms, 3 restaurants, 2 bards, 506 slot machines, and 11 table games.

== See also ==
- List of casinos in Nevada
- Maverick Gaming v. United States of America
