= Montego Bay Resort =

Casino hotel in Nevada, United States

Coordinates: 40.736395°N 114.044208°W

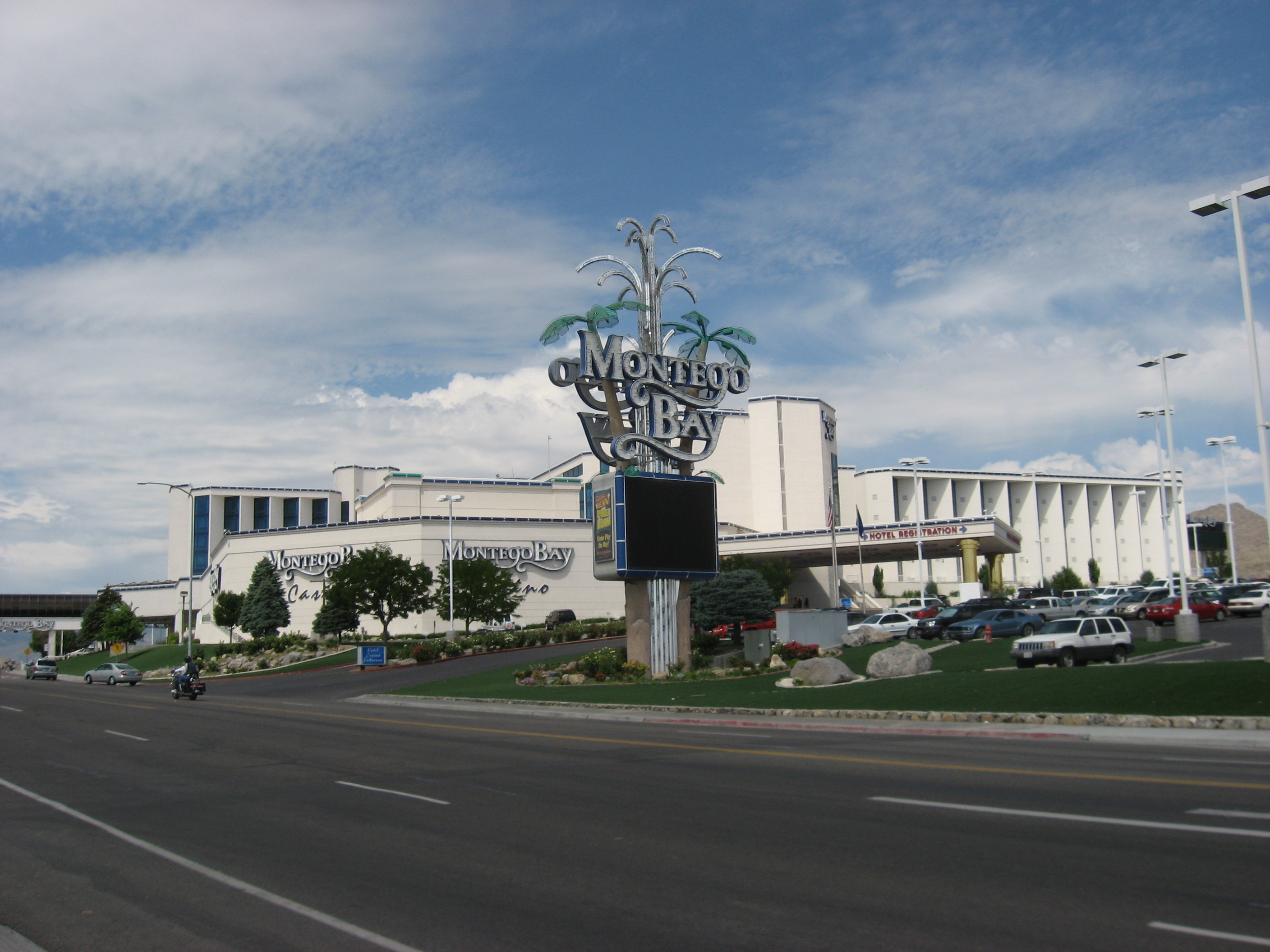
- Interactive map of Montego Bay Resort
- Location: West Wendover; 100 Wendover Blvd West Wendover, NV 89883
- Opened: 2002; 24 years ago
- No. of rooms: 552
- Gaming space: 40,000
- Casino type: Land-based
- Owner: Peppermill Casinos, Inc.
- Website: wendoverfun.com

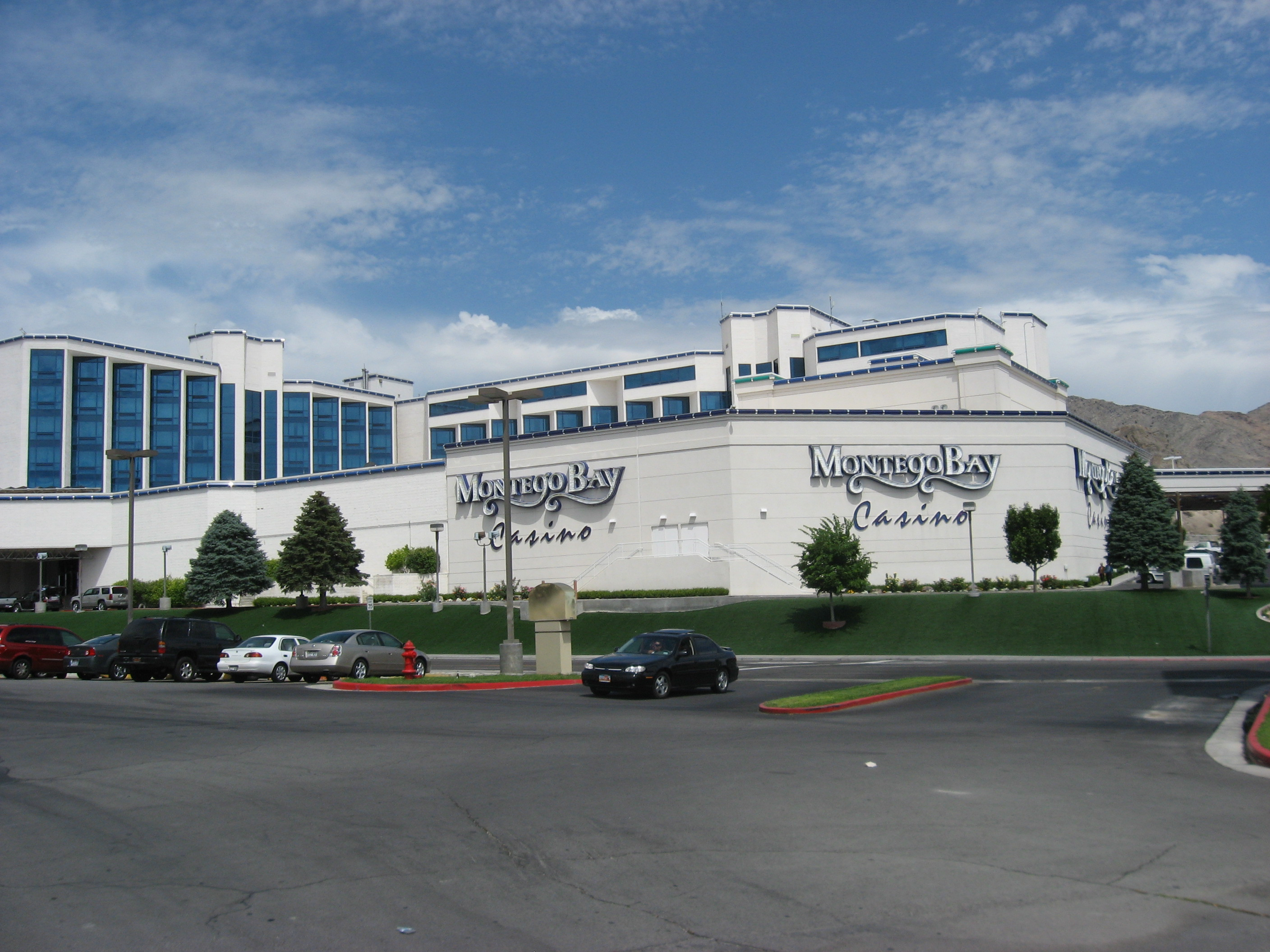
View of Montego Bay Casino from the South

Montego Bay Resort is a hotel and casino located in West Wendover, Nevada. In addition to the Wendover Nugget, it is located right on the border line between Nevada and Utah just south of Interstate 80. This casino as well as Rainbow and the Peppermill are owned and operated by Peppermill Casinos, Inc.

== History ==
From 1948 to 2002, the building before becoming the Montego Bay was previously called the A-1 Club, the Jim's Casino and the Silver Smith Casino.

== See also ==
- Peppermill Casinos
