= Wendover Will =

Casino sign in Nevada

Coordinates: 40.740196°N 114.072911°W

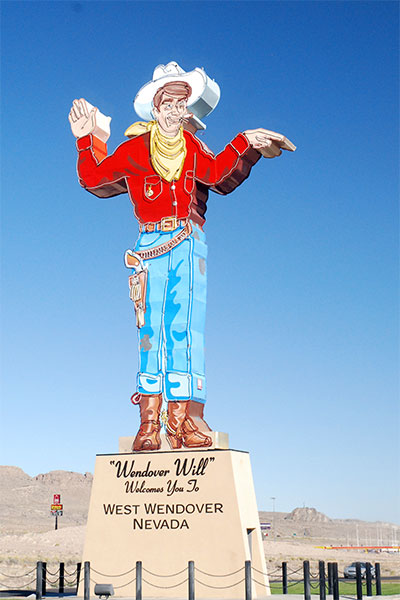
Wendover Will at current location on Wendover Boulevard

Wendover Will is a sign created for the Stateline Casino in West Wendover, Nevada in 1952. It is now a landmark for the town of West Wendover.

== History ==
Pat Denner was commissioned to design the sign for the Stateline Casino in 1952. Denner had just completed the Vegas Vic sign that was erected in 1951. The sign was constructed by The Young Electric Sign Company.

Wendover Will was named after the town of Wendover and William Smith, who founded the Stateline Casino. The 63-foot-tall (19 m) sign was intended to draw travelers in from US Highways 40 and 50, later known as Interstate 80. The sign includes 1,184 feet (361 m) of neon tubing. When driving east on Interstate 80 a caption under the sign reads, "This is the place," apparently in homage to Brigham Young. When driving west the caption reads, "Where the West begins".

When the Stateline Casino changed ownership, the sign was donated to Wendover. The town spent approximately $200,000 to restore the sign; the restoration was done by The Young Electric Sign Company. Wendover Will was moved to Wendover Boulevard in the town's center and a ribbon-cutting ceremony was held on June 9, 2005.

Wendover Will is a Registered Trademark of the City of West Wendover. Many locals refer to him simply as “the cowboy”.

== Recognition ==
When the town of West Wendover was incorporated in 1991, the sign was included on the city's seal. Wendover Will was included in the Guinness Book of Records as the "World's Largest Mechanical Cowboy".

== See also ==
- Stardust sign
- Vegas Vic
