= Adelstein–Lew controversy =

2022 poker controversy

- Date: September 29, 2022
- Venue: Hustler Casino
- Location: Gardena, California, United States; 33.8873°N 118.2207°W
- Type: Poker cheating controversy
- Cause: Allegation of cheating in a poker hand
- Filmed by: Hustler Casino Live Stream
- Participants: Garrett Adelstein; Robbi Jade Lew; other poker players
- Outcome: Casino investigation led to no evidence of wrongdoing

Τhe Adelstein–Lew controversy arose after a hand of poker played on September 29, 2022, during a live stream from the Hustler Casino, in Gardena, California. A significant number of poker players, pundits, and analysts have described it as highly controversial, and one analyst called it "easily the most controversial poker hand of all time".

The controversy began when amateur player Robbi Jade Lew called an all-in raise by professional Garrett Adelstein, despite holding quite a weak hand—J♣ 4♥—with a pair of tens from the community cards. Adelstein accused Lew of cheating, persuaded her to refund his bets, and left the casino; he later made these accusations public. An investigation by the casino found no evidence of wrongdoing on Lew's part, but found that a casino employee had stolen $15,000 worth of chips from her stack. Public and expert opinion was sharply split between those who supported Lew and those who believed that she cheated.

== The hand ==
On September 29, 2022, the Hustler Casino, in Gardena, California, broadcast the live stream of a high-stakes hold 'em cash game. The betting format called for three blinds of $100, $200, and $400 respectively, with a $400 big blind ante and an $800 straddle in play. (Note: Game terminology can be found in Texas hold 'em.) The players seated at the table were a mix of professionals and amateurs:

- Garrett Adelstein, a poker professional and former Survivor contestant
- Robbi Jade Lew, a Saudi Arabia–born Los Angeles resident who started playing online poker during the COVID-19 pandemic
- Jacob "Rip" Chavez, a former boxing trainer
- An Asian regular playing under the pseudonym Ryusuke Daifuku
- Michael "Mike X" Farid, an Iranian-American fashion designer
- Phil Ivey, a professional poker player considered among the best in the world
- Eric Persson, owner of Maverick Gaming
- Andy "Stacks" Tsai of GGPoker China

In the specific hand, Adelstein was dealt 7♣ 8♣ in the third blind and raised to $3,000 before the flop. Lew was on the straddle, having position. She called while the rest of the table folded. The flop came 10♣ 10♥ 9♣, giving Adelstein a flush draw, an open-ended straight draw and an open-ended straight flush draw, and making him a 65%/35% favorite. Adelstein, first to act, bet $2,500 and Lew, with the pot at $9,200, immediately called.

The turn was the 3♥, improving neither player's hand. Adelstein bet $10,000, making the pot $21,700. Lew raised to $20,000 and Adelstein re-raised all-in covering Lew's remaining $109,000 stack. After taking some time to think and talk to Adelstein, Lew called, and they ran the river twice. With the two distinct river cards coming up 9♦ and A♠, neither player improved, and Lew won the $270,000 pot with Jack high.

=== Reaction at the table ===
The stream commentator exclaimed, "I'm speechless!" and "My God! What is going on?" and suggested that Lew had probably misread her hand. Adelstein remained silent, eventually walking away from the table. The commentator said he had never seen Adelstein so disturbed, adding that there was nothing suspicious in Lew's previous plays.

The players at the table made various comments, such as "That was not poker" but did not claim anything untoward had occurred, although Andy Stacks stated that the hand was "odd" and requested explanation. Ryusuke complimented Lew for "a great call".

Lew got up from the table and spoke with Adelstein, who claimed that he and stream producer Ryan Feldman requested a conversation with Lew off camera. For her part, Lew claimed she was "cornered & threatened" and consequently offered to return Adelstein the money he had lost in the hand. Both parties agree that Adelstein accepted the offer and that she paid him off with chips from her stack. He then left the casino premises.

== Cheating claim ==
The next day, Adelstein, in a series of tweets, claimed he was cheated in the hand. On October 7, 2022, he presented his case in detail on the poker website TwoPlusTwo.com, opening with the proclamation

I can again say with great confidence that Robbi [Jade Lew] was very likely part of a cheating ring of at least three members, including her, RIP [Jacob "Rip" Chavez], Bryan [Sagbigsal] and potentially others.

Lew, after initially giving vague and often contradicting explanations for her decisions in the hand, strongly rejected all accusations of cheating, which included claims that she wore a vibrating ring designed to send her information. She agreed to undergo a lie detector test, which she passed.

== Casino investigation ==
On October 1, 2022, High Stakes Poker Productions, which owns and operates the Hustler Casino streaming service through the YouTube channel, announced the undertaking of a "comprehensive investigation" that would include forensic examination by a "third-party cybersecurity company". The company also announced it would employ the services of a Los Angeles–based legal and private investigations firm that would conduct interviews and provide research.

After two and a half months, on December 14, 2022, Hustler Casino issued a press release, announcing that the investigation found "no conclusive evidence of wrongdoing" in the controversial hand, or in any other hand played that night.

Hustler stated that the investigation, which ostensibly cost "more than $100,000", went to "great lengths" to determine if any evidence of wrongdoing could be found. The conclusion of the investigation, they stated, was based on the findings and assessments of the cybersecurity experts, on the testimony of players both at the table and unrelated to the incident, on interviews of employees and third parties, on the thorough review of the videos of all the hands played on the show, and on the examination of the surveillance video covering both the whole casino area and the parking lot. However, the statement included the admission that, although there was no credible evidence of wrongdoing, the related, extensive review of the casino's technology, equipment and protocols uncovered "improvements that could be implemented to improve the security" of the stream.

=== Chip theft ===
During the casino's investigation, examination of the surveillance videos revealed that after the streaming broadcast had concluded, an employee of High Stakes Poker Productions, Bryan Sagbigsal, stole chips worth $15,000 from Lew's stack. Hustler Casino Live owners Nick Vertucci and Ryan Feldman announced that the employee had a criminal record, something that was not noticed during his hiring process. Sagbigsal admitted to taking the chips and was "immediately" fired.

When the announcement was made, Lew stated that she did not wish to pursue criminal charges against Sagbigsal. Her position caused widespread speculation in the poker community, with players and commentators arguing that her decision could be a sign that she and the fired employee had been "illicitly working together." Some poker players who, until the chip stealing was discovered, had been on Lew's side, announced on social media that they had changed their minds. Adelstein tweeted that he "harbor[s] no ill will towards...those who have reconsidered their position". The next afternoon, Lew tweeted she had received new information that has caused her to reconsider, and said that she would press charges against the fired employee.

On November 22, Sagbigsal was charged with two counts of felony grand theft. He pleaded not guilty to the charges. In July 2025, he was convicted and sentenced to 16 months in county jail, less 84 days' credit for time served.

== Reactions ==
The poker community stood mostly divided in two camps, each holding a strong opinion either supporting or rejecting the cheating allegations.

The scandal hit major media and online news websites, both in the US and abroad.

=== Assessment by experts ===
Phil Ivey, regarded by many as among the best poker players of all time, who was at the table that night, said that, in his opinion, there was no cheating in the hand, assigning Lew's play and her subsequent statement to a combination of bad play, confusion, and embarrassment. Ivey stated "the best, most reasonable explanation" is that "[Lew] thought she had Jack-three, (Note: A three in her hand would have given her a pair at the turn.) misread her hand and [then] she didn't want to say she misread her hand because she's at a poker table." Eric Persson, co-founder and CEO of Maverick Gaming, agreed with Ivey's take. In video of the hand, before her call, Lew is seen asking: "Three is no good?"

Poker professional and coach Daniel Negreanu, in statements and tweets, came "strongly" on the side of Lew not cheating. Negreanu stated that, in his view, the "most rational explanation" for the hand's denouement was that Lew was "simply overwhelmed in a big spot" and "made a panicked decision". He added that he did not accept Lew's decision to refund the money as an admission of guilt and also considered the bulge in Lew's right pocket not suspicious. Poker pro Xuan Liu opined that Negreanu was correct in his assessment, adding that Lew should not have returned the money she won to Adelstein.

Poker professional Douglas K. Polk posted the image of Lew's pants online and claimed that "it's overwhelmingly likely that she's cheating." In the same statement, however, he said that "it's not known for sure [whether she cheated]." Poker professional Tom Dwan came down in favor of the cheating explanation, while poker pro Phil Galfond bemoaned the appearance of two opposite, strongly founded camps in the debate and argued that the issue should be examined by "open-minded people rather than each side cherry-picking evidence to support their take". Galfond stated he did not believe any cheating occurred but would be "happy" to change his mind if new evidence were to come to light.

Brian Koppelman, co-author of the poker-themed movie Rounders, posted a message to Adelstein, asking him why he was so sure that the hand in question was cheating. Koppelman, who says he "stud[ies] cheating," argued that Lew "seemed embarrassed to have made a bad play" and tries to "cover" it, unlike a cheater.

Michael Shackleford, mathematician and actuary, as well as the owner of the Wizard of Odds website of statistical and other insights to gambling, published an analysis by a friend with the pen name "Rigondeaux". Rigondeaux used the Occam's razor principle in his assessment, claiming that the "simplest explanation" is that Lew misread her hand or just made a crazy call. The scenarios in which she is guilty, Rigondeaux pointed out, are all "complex", rivaling "outlandish conspiracy theories". He concluded that there was little compelling evidence that Lew cheated, adding that Lew had provided significant evidence of innocence.

=== Accusations of misogyny ===
Accusations of misogyny against Adelstein and those who supported his claim of having been cheated appeared in social media. Lew, in an interview to the NextIO channel, said she did find misogyny to be part of the reaction against her and how she played the hand, as well as in the accusations of cheating. She explained her decisions in the hand as "just a crazy play".

The claims of misogyny were met with a strong reaction by the poker community. Poker pro Melissa Bryne found the claims "ridiculous". She commented that Lew's "play was terrible" and "sometimes terrible plays win," without accepting the claims of cheating. "Not everything is man vs woman," she pointed out. Canadian poker pro and self-proclaimed feminist Vanessa Kade tweeted that, "in a vacuum", the hand indeed "merits an investigation", yet agreed that "some (not all) of the coverage has some underlying sexism and voluntary exclusion of evidence that suggests [Lew's] innocence."

Another poker pro, Bart Hanson, opined that Adelstein had been honest in his belief that he was cheated but that his belief was not based in any kind of sexist sentiment. Former poker pro Melissa Burr praised those poker players who analyzed the hand "through a critical lens regardless of gender". Liv Boeree, another former poker pro, strongly disputed all claims of misogyny, tweeting that "there is a *real chance* [Lew] was cheating in this case, & misogyny has [very] little to do with it."

== Aftermath ==
Adelstein was back at the televised poker tables by the end of 2023, taking part in World Poker Tour high-stakes cash games at the Wynn Las Vegas. He maintains that he is "extremely confident" he was cheated in the hand.

Lew has since been interviewed by numerous publications and continued to proclaim her innocence. She has said that she would not have given the money back if she knew that it would be used against her as proof of guilt, and that she has nothing to hide, but feels "mystified" by the amount of attention she is still getting, with fans messaging her "from every friggin’ country". In 2024, she participated in The Anonymous reality show and competed in the year's World Series of Poker.

Poker industry insiders remarked that the Adelstein–Lew controversy "reached so far outside of the poker world and got [so many] more people interested in poker" that it became "one of those things where [poker] actually grew from the experience". Hustler Casino representatives stated the institution is now focused on "looking ahead and learning from the ordeal".

== See also ==
- Cheating in chess
- Cheating in casinos
- Stones Gambling Hall cheating scandal
