= The Anonymous =

Season of reality television series

- Promotional poster
- Genre: Reality competition
- Narrated by: Dani Fernandez
- Country of origin: United States
- Original language: English
- No. of seasons: 1
- No. of episodes: 12

Production
- Executive producers: Jack Burgess; Andy Cadman; Tim Harcourt; Toni Ireland; Stephen Lambert; Stephen Yemoh
- Running time: 45–60 minutes
- Production company: Studio Lambert

Original release
- Network: USA Network
- Release: August 19 – October 21, 2024

The Anonymous is an American reality game show produced by Studio Lambert originally broadcast on USA Network. The series premiered on USA Network on August 19, 2024. The first season concluded on October 21, 2024. It was cancelled after its first season in 2025.

== Format ==
The game is played with 15 contestants who live together while simultaneously playing a hidden anonymous online game. During the day, players interacted face-to-face to build alliances, gather information, and figure out who they could trust. Separately, each contestant enter a private "Hideout" to communicate in "Anonymous Mode" through secret online handles controlled by an AI system called DANI. Throughout the season, contestants competed in challenges to increase a prize pot worth up to $100,000, while also trying to correctly identify which anonymous profiles belonged to which players. The contestant who best maintained their anonymity and successfully identified others gained power in the game, including the ability to eliminate another player.

== Contestants ==
The cast of The Anonymous features fifteen contestants from diverse professional and personal backgrounds, ranging in age from their 20s to their 60s. Among the contestants are some former reality TV personalities, two time Australian Survivor contestant Nina Twine, Big Brother 23 winner Xavier Prather and Fyre Festival producer Andy King.

Name	Age	Occupation	Hometown	Initial Handle	First Refresh	Second Refresh	Result
Nina Twine	26	Account Specialist	Fayetteville, North Carolina	Popcorn	Fire	Wolf	Winner (Episode 12)
Marcel Cunningham	33	Video Game Streamer	Seattle, Washington	Dollar sign	Snake	Crown	Runners-up (Episode 12)
Andy King	62	Event planner	Charleston, South Carolina	Butterfly	Lightning	Banana	Runners-up (Episode 12)
Christopher Shulstad	28	Chef	Charlotte, North Carolina	Donut	Lipsick	Tea	Runners-up (Episode 12)
Victoria Vesce	31	Travel Blogger	Nashville, North Carolina		Cactus	Ghost	Eliminated (Episode 12)
Lilly Jenkins	26	Project Manager	Detroit, Michigan	Pizza	Robot	Rainbow	Eliminated (Episode 12)
Dillian Frelow	27	Employee Experience Manager	Los Angeles, California	Alien	Popsicle	Sushi	Eliminated (Episode 11)
Bismah Ahmed	33	Political Lobbyist	Richmond, Virginia		Eagle		Eliminated (Episode 10)
Jack Usher	31	National Board Game Champion	Brooklyn, New York	Football	Flamingo		Eliminated (Episode 9)
Xavier Prather	29	Lawyer	Milwaukee, Wisconsin	Fish	Scissors		Eliminated (Episode 7)
Wayne Nichols	46	Former Police Detective	Henderson, Nevada		Lightbulb		Eliminated (Episode 6)
Robbi Jade Lew	40	Professional Poker Player	Los Angeles, California	Dice	Rocket		Eliminated (Episode 5)
Tyrenna Tolbert	54	Military Operations Advisor	Charles County, Maryland	Truck			Eliminated (Episode 4)
Kacie B. Mize	32	Podcast Informant Consultant	Knoxville, Tennessee	Shark			Eliminated (Episode 3)
Sydney Dorsey	22	Hair Salon Owner	Emanuel County, Georgia	Wizard			Eliminated (Episode 2)

== Voting history ==
Color key:

Winner
Runner-up
The Anonymous
Safety
Won safety via face-off
Nominated
Eliminated

Voting history
Round	1	2	3	4	5	6	7	8	9	10	11	12	Finale
Safety winner(s)	Robbi	Xavier	Marcel	Jack	Dillian	(None)	Jack; Lilly; Marcel	Nina	Andy; Lilly; Nina; Victoria	Nina	Nina	Christopher	(None)
Nominated	Andy; Christopher; Dillian; ~~Jack~~ (Note: This Player became the Anonymous and therefore was safe from elimination.); Lilly; Marcel; Sydney	Andy; Kacie; Lilly; Marcel; Robbi	Andy; Christopher; Lilly; Tyrenna	Andy; Christopher; Nina; Robbi; Xavier	Christopher; ~~Jack~~; Marcel; Nina; Wayne; Xavier	Bismah; Dillian; ~~Lilly~~; Nina; Xavier	Bismah; Christopher; Dillian; Jack; Lilly; Marcel; ~~Nina~~	Andy; Bismah; Christopher; Jack; Lilly; Marcel; ~~Victoria~~	Bismah; Christopher; Dillian; Marcel	Andy; ~~Christopher~~; Dillian; Lilly	Andy; Lilly; Victoria	Andy; Marcel; Nina; Victoria	(None)
The Anonymous	Jack	Jack	Xavier	Victoria	Jack	Lilly	Nina	Victoria	Nina	Christopher	Marcel	Marcel	(None)
Nina	Sydney	Robbi	Tyrenna	Andy	Xavier	Xavier	Lilly; ~~Marcel~~ (Note: As Marcel was safe, Nina's vote did not count and no player was eliminated.)	Lilly (Note: This player won safety at the challenge.)	Christopher; Bismah	Lilly	Victoria	Nominated	Winner (Episode 12)
Andy	Lilly	Marcel	Marcel	Christopher	Dillian	Lilly	Dillian	Andy	Dillian (Note: This player won safety at the face-off.)	Dillian	Victoria	Nominated	Runners-up (Episode 12)
Christopher	Marcel	Lilly	Tyrenna	Nina	Wayne	Bismah	Lilly	Lilly	Dillian	Andy; Dillian	Andy	Safety	Runners-up (Episode 12)
Marcel	Dillian	Kacie	Lilly	Andy	Dillian	Dillian	Dillian	Bismah	Lilly	Christopher	Lilly; Lilly	Victoria	Runners-up (Episode 12)
Victoria	Not in House			Christopher (Note: As they joined the game late, this player was reward with safety.); Robbi	Christopher	Xavier	Bismah	Marcel; Jack	Christopher	Lilly	Lilly	Nominated	Eliminated (Episode 12)
Lilly	Christopher	Marcel	Christopher	Nina	Nina	Nina; Xavier	Nina	Bismah	Christopher	Lilly	Andy	Eliminated (Episode 12)	
Dillian	Sydney	Marcel	Marcel	Robbi	Wayne; Jack (Note: This player had to nominate a player outside of Anonymous Mode.)	Xavier	Jack	Jack	Dillian	Andy	Eliminated (Episode 11)		
Bismah	Not in House			Xavier	Marcel	Xavier	Marcel	Christopher	Dillian	Eliminated (Episode 10)			
Jack	Andy; Sydney	Andy; Kacie	Tyrenna	Christopher	Xavier; Wayne	Dillian	Christopher	Victoria	Eliminated (Episode 9)				
Xavier	Sydney	Marcel	Tyrenna; Tyrenna	Andy	Wayne	Xavier	Eliminated (Episode 7)						
Wayne	Not in House			Christopher	Dillian	Eliminated (Episode 6)							
Robbi	Lilly	Lilly	Lilly	Xavier	Eliminated (Episode 5)								
Tyrenna	Sydney	Robbi	Andy	Eliminated (Episode 4)									
Kacie	Sydney	Andy	Eliminated (Episode 3)										
Sydney	Jack	Eliminated (Episode 2)											
Eliminated	Sydney; Jack's choice to eliminate	Kacie; Jack's choice to eliminate	Tyrenna; Xavier's choice to eliminate	Robbi; Victoria's choice to eliminate	Wayne; Jack's choice to eliminate	Xavier; Lilly's choice to eliminate	(None)	Jack; Victoria's choice to eliminate	Bismah; Nina's choice to eliminate	Dillian; Christopher's choice to eliminate	Lilly; Marcel's choice to eliminate	Victoria; Marcel's choice to eliminate	Nina; Winner
Eliminated	Sydney; Jack's choice to eliminate	Kacie; Jack's choice to eliminate	Tyrenna; Xavier's choice to eliminate	Robbi; Victoria's choice to eliminate	Wayne; Jack's choice to eliminate	Xavier; Lilly's choice to eliminate	(None)	Jack; Victoria's choice to eliminate	Bismah; Nina's choice to eliminate	Dillian; Christopher's choice to eliminate	Lilly; Marcel's choice to eliminate	Victoria; Marcel's choice to eliminate	Andy; Christopher; Marcel; Runners-up

== Challenges ==
Episode	Title	Money earned	Total pot	Safety
1	"Welcome to The Anonymous"	$9,500	$9,500	Robbi
2	"Can You Handle It?"	$22,650	$32,150	Xavier
4	"New Handle, New Me"	$9,000	$41,150	Jack
6	"The Price of Safety"	$190	$41,340	Marcel
8	"Divide & Conquer"	$8,000	$49,340	Nina
10	"Refresh. Revamp. Restrategize."	$10,000	$59,340	Nina
11	"Buzzed Off"	$10,000	$69,340	Nina
12	"Welcome to the Finale"	$10,660	$80,000	Christopher

== Episodes ==
The Anonymous season 1 episodes
No. overall	No. in season	Title	Original release date
1	1	"Welcome to the Anonymous"	August 19, 2024
2	2	"Can You Handle It?"	August 20, 2024
3	3	"The Face-Off"	August 20, 2024
4	4	"New Handle, New Me"	August 26, 2024
5	5	"Build. Bluff. Betray."	September 2, 2024
6	6	"The Price of Safety"	September 9, 2024
7	7	"Plot Twist!"	September 16, 2024
8	8	"Divide & Conquer"	September 23, 2024
9	9	"Silent Mode"	September 30, 2024
10	10	"Refresh. Revamp. Restrategize."	October 7, 2024
11	11	"Buzzed Off"	October 14, 2024
12	12	"Welcome to the Finale"	October 21, 2024
