= A-1 Club =

Defunct casino in Las Vegas, Nevada

Coordinates: 40.7404°N 114.0753°W

- Interactive map of A-1 Club
- Location: West Wendover
- Opened: 1948
- Closed: 1967; 59 years ago
- Casino type: Land

A-1 Club was a gas station and coffee shop originally and then in 1948 expanded to include a casino. This was located in West Wendover, Nevada.

== History ==
The A-1 Club (casino operations) opened in 1948 and closed in 1967.

In the earlier years of the A-1, it basically functioned as the mess hall for Wendover Army Air Field when the air field was not in full training mode and the on-base mess hall was not available.

According to one reference, it was owned by a man named Twain West. However, in another article about casinos of West Wendover, the man's name is Fred West. The casino was bought out by the wife of Casino owner William "Bill" Smith who owned the Stateline Casino. The wife's name was Anna Smith, and she then renamed the A-1 Club to Jim's Casino and continued to run the business. In 1972 - Jim’s Casino took the place of the A-1 Casino.
