= Wendover Nugget =

Casino hotel in West Wendover, Nevada, United States

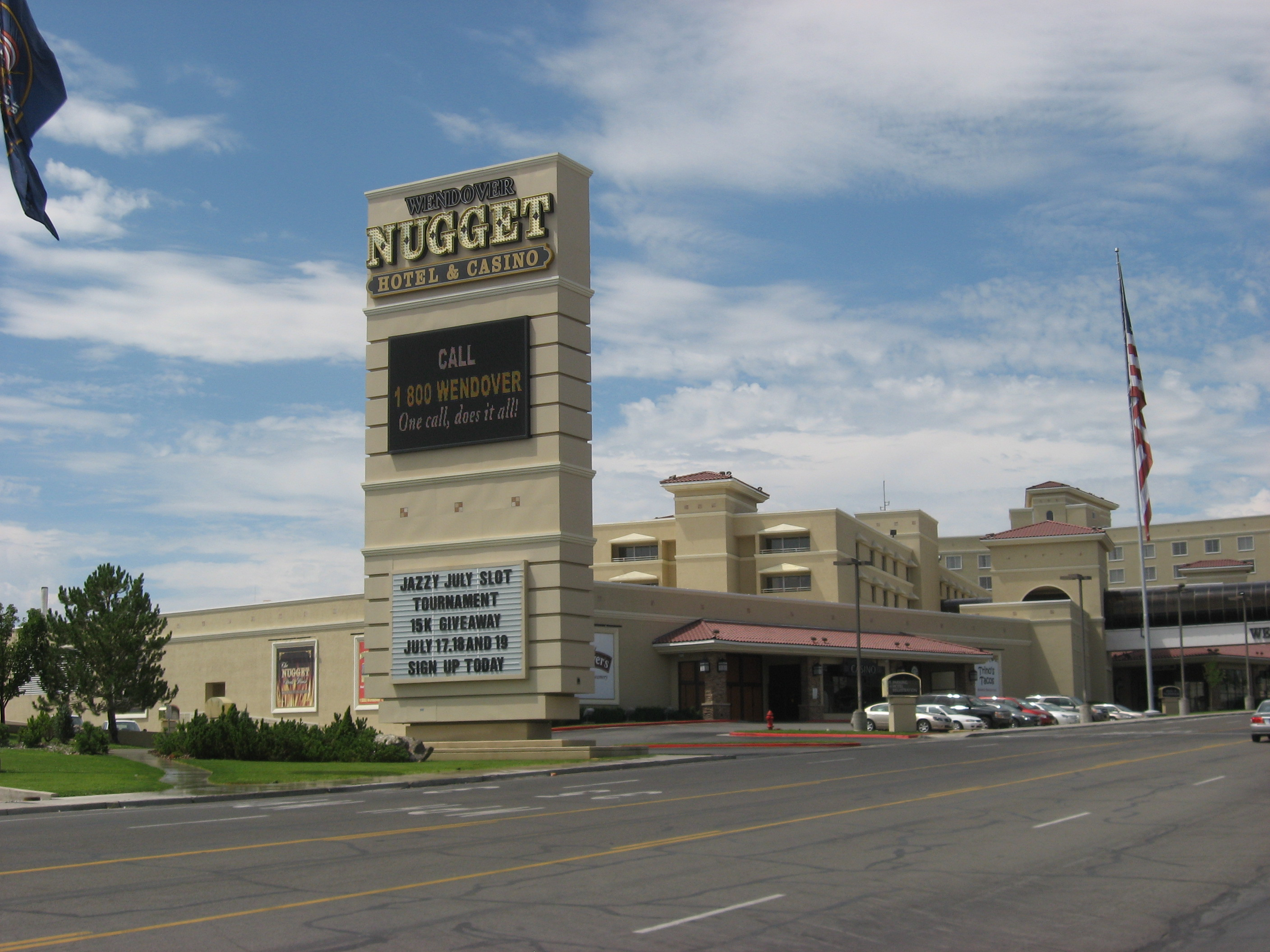
- Interactive map of Wendover Nugget
- Location: West Wendover; 101 Wendover Blvd West Wendover, NV 89883; 40.735515°N 114.043542°W
- Opened: 2004; 22 years ago
- No. of rooms: 426 standard, 64 Suites
- Gaming space: 47,500 sq ft (4,410 m^{2})
- Casino type: Land-based
- Owner: Maverick Gaming
- Website: wendoverresorts.com

Wendover Nugget is a hotel and casino located in West Wendover, Nevada, located right on the border line between Utah and Nevada. Colloquially known as "The Nugget", there is a connecting skyway between The Nugget and Montego Bay. Both establishments’ buildings are located almost directly on the state line, while their parking lots are in Utah.

== History ==
The origins of the first building at this location dates back to 1926 when William "Bill" Smith opened up a service station and then in 1931 expanded it when gambling became legal. He then named it the Stateline Casino. From 2002 to 2004 it was named the Stateline Nugget. Then after changing ownership in 2004, the casino was renamed to what is now called the Wendover Nugget.

In 2010, the casino was acquired by David Ensign, half brother of former U.S. Senator John Ensign. As of 2023, the casino is operated by Maverick Gaming, who also operate the nearby Red Garter.

== Incidents ==
On August 1, 2007, two people were involved in an attempt to rob the casino, one of which was a casino employee. Both suspects were arrested shortly after the attempt.

On October 14, 2007, Carlos Garcia-Castillijos was murdered. During a fight between him and his wife, two brothers intervened, and were suspected of killing Carlos. The two suspects in the case were apprehended by police in Utah.

== See also ==
- List of casinos in Nevada
