= Thomas Young (entrepreneur) =

British entrepreneur (1895–1971)

- Born: May 26, 1895; Sunderland, England, United Kingdom
- Died: September 11, 1971 (aged 76); Salt Lake City, Utah, United States
- Occupation: Founder of the Young Electric Sign Company
- Years active: 1920–1971
- Spouse: Elmina Carlisle
- Parent(s): George W. Young; Emily Tate Young
- Website: YESCO.com

Thomas Young (May 26, 1895 – September 11, 1971) was a British entrepreneur from Sunderland, England, who founded the Young Electric Sign Company.

== Biography ==
He was born on May 26, 1895, in Sunderland, England.

Young's family converted to the Church of Jesus Christ of Latter-day Saints in his infancy. At age 15, Young and his family sailed from Liverpool, England, to Montreal, Quebec, Canada, and continued on to Ogden, Utah, United States, by train.

Young founded the Thomas Young Sign Company on March 20, 1920, in Ogden, Utah. Soon thereafter, Young changed the company name to Young Electric Sign Company. In 1931 he realized that with the start of the construction of Boulder Dam there would be enough electricity for Las Vegas, where gambling was now legal.

Young and his company specialized in neon signs built for businesses throughout the intermountain west and Las Vegas. He and his company created many of the famous signs in Las Vegas, Nevada, such as the Circus Circus clown sign and the Welcome to Fabulous Las Vegas sign (created by Western Neon later acquired by YESCO.

He died on September 11, 1971, in Salt Lake City, Utah.
