= Rainbow Casino (West Wendover) =

Casino hotel in Nevada, United States

Coordinates: 40.737346°N 114.064023°W

Rainbow Wendover
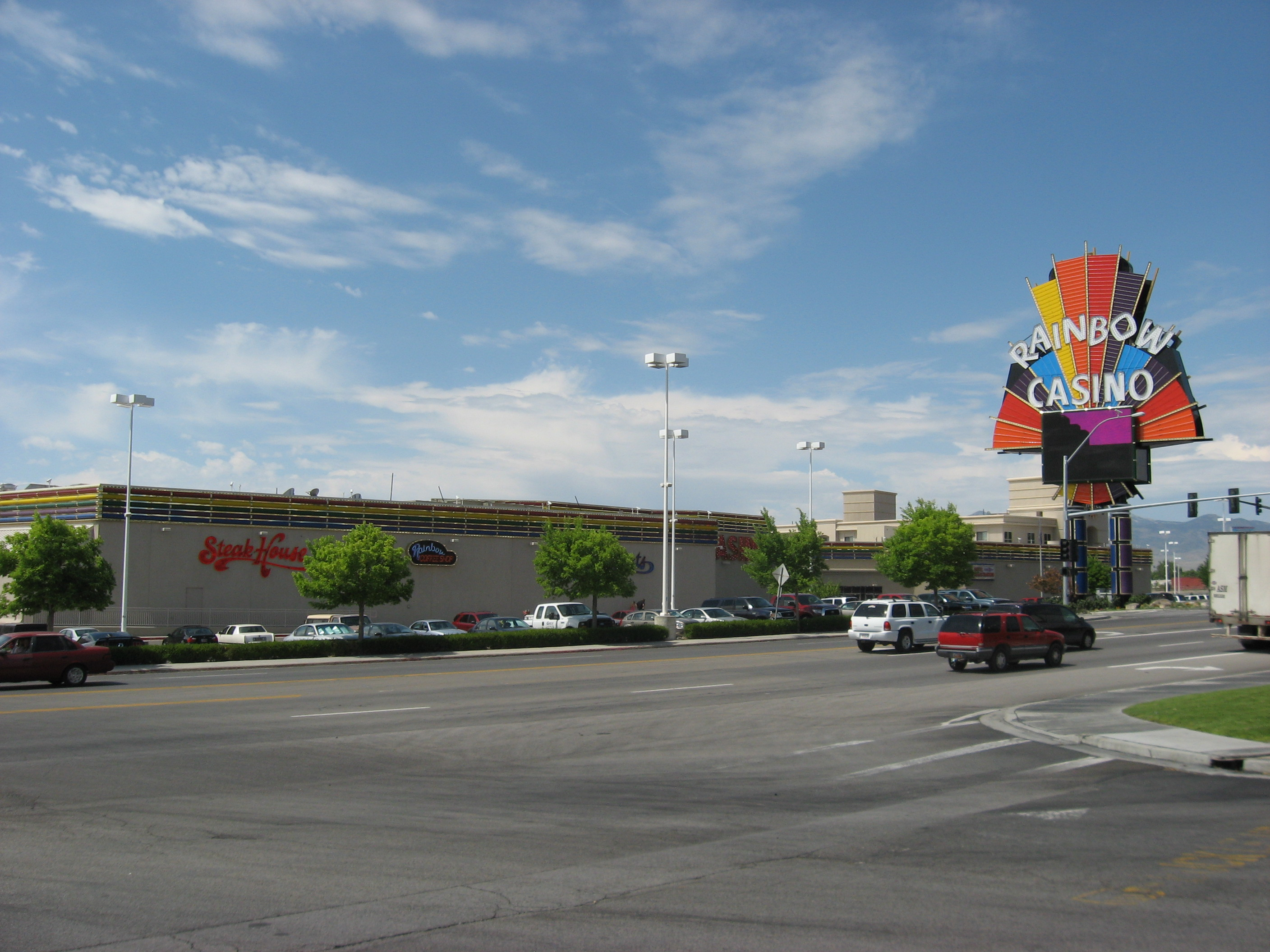
- Interactive map of Rainbow Wendover
- Location: West Wendover; 1045 Wendover Boulevard, West Wendover, NV 89883
- Opened: 1996; 30 years ago
- No. of rooms: 429
- Gaming space: 45,624
- Casino type: Land-based
- Owner: Peppermill Casinos, Inc.
- Website: wendoverfun.com

Rainbow Wendover is a hotel and casino located in West Wendover, Nevada. This casino as well as the Peppermill and the Montego Bay are owned and operated by Peppermill Casinos, Inc.

== History ==
The casino at this location was formerly known as the Nevada Crossing Casino. It was purchased by Peppermill Casinos in 1996, was expanded and remodeled and re-opened.
