= YESCO =

American manufacturer of electric signs

Young Electric Sign Company
- Formerly: Thomas Young Sign Company
- Type: Private
- Industry: Signage; Lighting
- Founded: March 20, 1920
- Founder: Thomas Young Sr.
- Headquarters: Salt Lake City, Utah, U.S.
- Number of locations: ~85 offices
- Area served: North America
- Number of employees: ~1,000
- Website: www.yesco.com

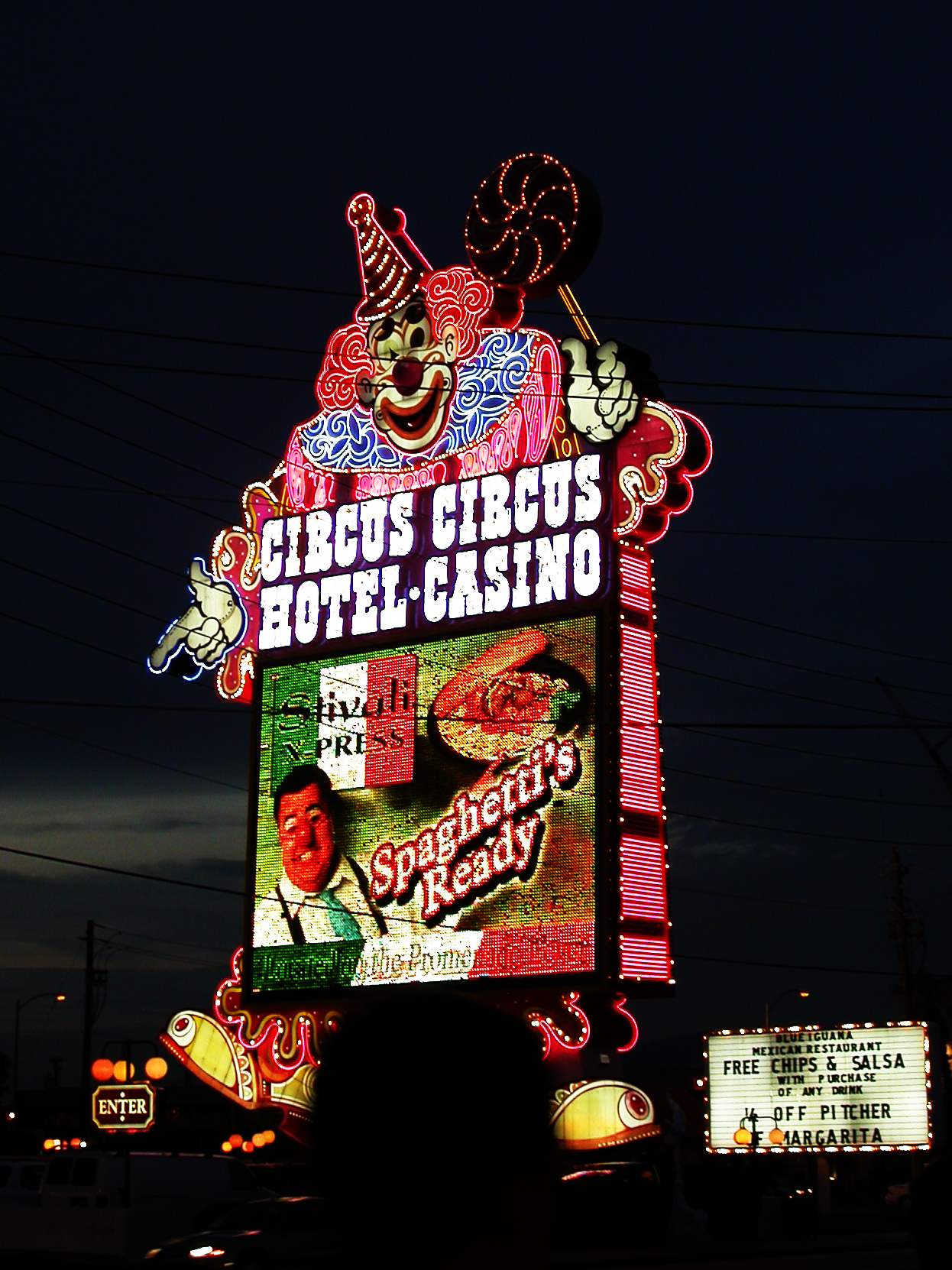
The Circus Circus Las Vegas sign by YESCO

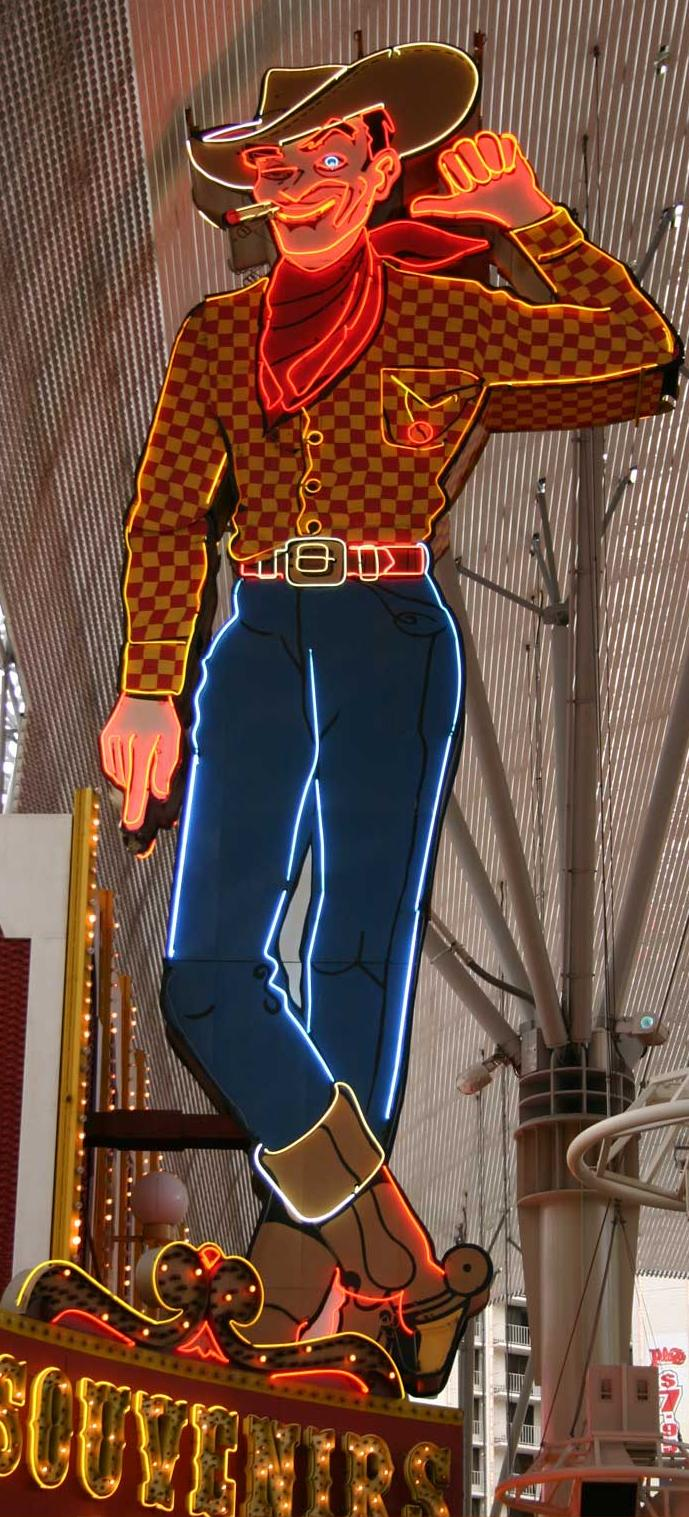
Vegas Vic sign by YESCO

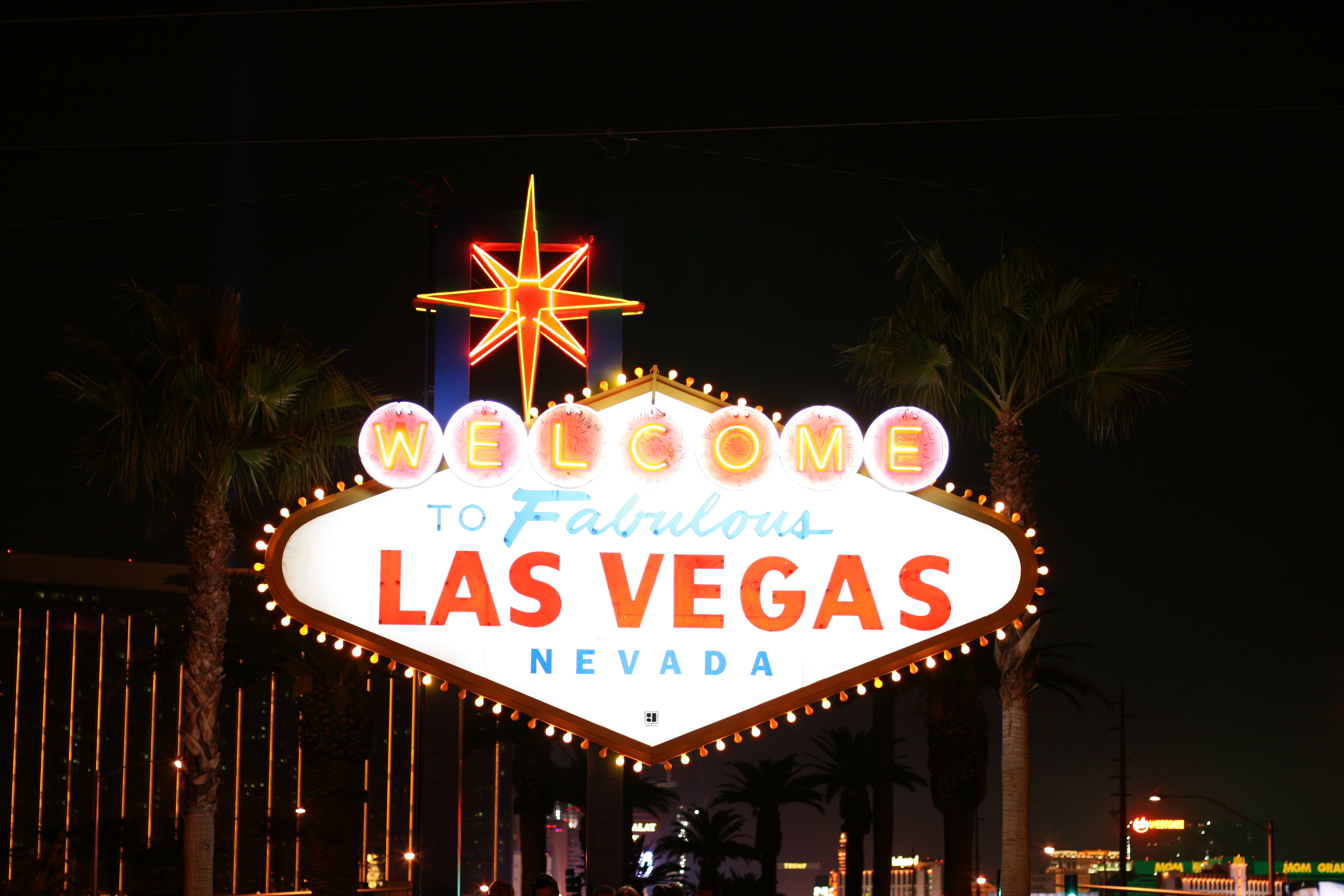
Welcome to Fabulous Las Vegas sign, owned by YESCO

YESCO is an American manufacturer of electric signs based in Salt Lake City, founded by Thomas Young in 1920. The company provides design, fabrication, installation and maintenance of signs.

Many notable sign projects have been produced by YESCO, including the NBC Experience globe in New York City, the historic El Capitan Theatre and Wax Museum marquees in Hollywood, the Reno Arch, and in Las Vegas, Vegas Vic, the Fremont Street Experience, the Astrolabe in The Venetian, the Wynn Las Vegas resort sign, the Welcome to Fabulous Las Vegas sign, and the Aria Resort & Casino.

== History ==
The company was created by Thomas Young on March 20, 1920. The young sign painter had left the United Kingdom just a decade earlier to immigrate with his family to Ogden, Utah. In the beginning, his shop specialized in coffin plates, gold leaf window lettering, lighted signs and painted advertisements.

In 1933, YESCO opened a branch office in the Apache Hotel in Las Vegas. The company erected its first neon sign in Las Vegas for the Boulder Club.

It erected the first neon sign in Las Vegas for the Boulder Club in the late 1930s, and in 1995, it completed the four-block-long Fremont Street Experience canopy in Las Vegas.

In recent years, YESCO has built an outdoor digital media (billboard) division of its business.

YESCO has approximately 1,000 employees, more than 40 offices, and operates three manufacturing plants featuring automated and custom equipment. Additional smaller manufacturing and service facilities are located in the United States and Canada.

YESCO offers sign and lighting service franchises in states east of Colorado and throughout Canada.

In 2015, Young Electric Sign Company sold YESCO Electronics, a subsidiary company, to Samsung Electronics of America, Inc., which rebranded the division as Prismview.

== Landmark Signs ==
=== The NBC Experience Store Globe ===
NBC created a new YESCO “message globe” in its NBC Experience store, located at Rockefeller Center, New York City.

From the outside of the building, it looks like an illuminated globe. The 35’-diameter hemisphere is covered with LEDs. The animations were provided by YESCO's media services group. When it was first turned on, it stopped traffic on West 49th Street.

=== Vegas Vic ===
As a well-known electronic sign, Vegas Vic was designed by and built by YESCO. Upon its installation in 1951 over the Pioneer Club on historical Fremont Street, the 40'-tall electronic neon sign became Las Vegas's unofficial greeter.

=== Wynn Las Vegas ===
The 135-foot (41 m) tall marquee features a 100-foot (30 m) high, 50-foot (15 m) wide, concave, double-faced LED message center with a first-of-its-kind “moving eraser.” Conceived by Steve Wynn, the massive eraser glides up and down over the LED message center, appearing to change the graphics as it goes. The eraser weighs 62,000 pounds, and is counterbalanced by a 62,000-pound weight inside the sign.

The sign uses 4,377,600 LEDs and the eraser is powered by a 300 horsepower (220 kW) motor at its base that runs a gear and cable system. The firm of FTSI engineered the 62,000-pound eraser's movement, which is capable of speeds up to 10 feet per second (3.0 m/s).

=== The Fremont Street Experience ===
In 1995 YESCO engineered and installed the original Fremont Street Experience. With more than 1.9 million lamps, it was the largest and most unique video display in the world.

=== Welcome to Fabulous Las Vegas ===
YESCO owns the Welcome to Fabulous Las Vegas sign.

== Other projects ==
YESCO designed and installed the signs and light-up strips at Allegiant Stadium, the home of the Las Vegas Raiders and UNLV Rebels Football. The company also designed and installed the signage at the Raiders' headquarters and practice facility in Henderson, Nevada.

The company has provided support to the Neon Museum, which is dedicated to preserving the neon signs and associated artifacts of Las Vegas. Some of the retired signs include the sign for the Silver Slipper casino and Aladdin's lamp from the first version of the Aladdin Casino.

== Key individuals ==
=== Founder ===
Born in Sunderland, United Kingdom, in 1895, Thomas Young was 15 years old when his family emigrated to Ogden, Utah. The boy applied his passion to making signs. He began by creating wall-lettering and gold-leaf window signs, working for the Electric Service Company and the Redfield-King Sign Company in Ogden.

Young married Elmina Carlisle in 1916. In 1920, he founded his own sign company: Thomas Young Sign Company, which specialized in coffin plates, gold window lettering, lighted signs and painted advertisements.

In 1932, Young expanded his business to Las Vegas, and within two years, he purchased the Ogden Armory for $12,000 to expand the production capacity. He also opened a branch in Salt Lake City that year.

Young was elected president of the National Sign Association in 1936, serving for two terms. A year later, in 1937, he moved his family and YESCO headquarters to Salt Lake City, Utah, and continued the business.

Today, the company is led by members of the third and fourth generations of the Young family and designs, services, and maintains displays for a range of commercial clients.

=== Designers ===
Some of YESCO's most prominent signage designers have included:

- Charles Barnard – designer of Vegas Vickie
- Rudy Crisostomo – designer of the Rio's column
- Pat Denner – designer of the Vegas Vic and Wendover Will
- Dan Edwards – designer of Lucky the Clown of Circus Circus
- Jim Geitzen – designer of the Aria Resort and Casino and The Linq
- Jack Larsen Sr – designer of the Silver Slipper
- Kermit Wayne – designer of the Stardust
- Betty Willis - designer of the Welcome to Fabulous Las Vegas sign
