= Peppermill Wendover =

Casino hotel in Nevada, United States

Coordinates: 40.737242°N 114.055595°W

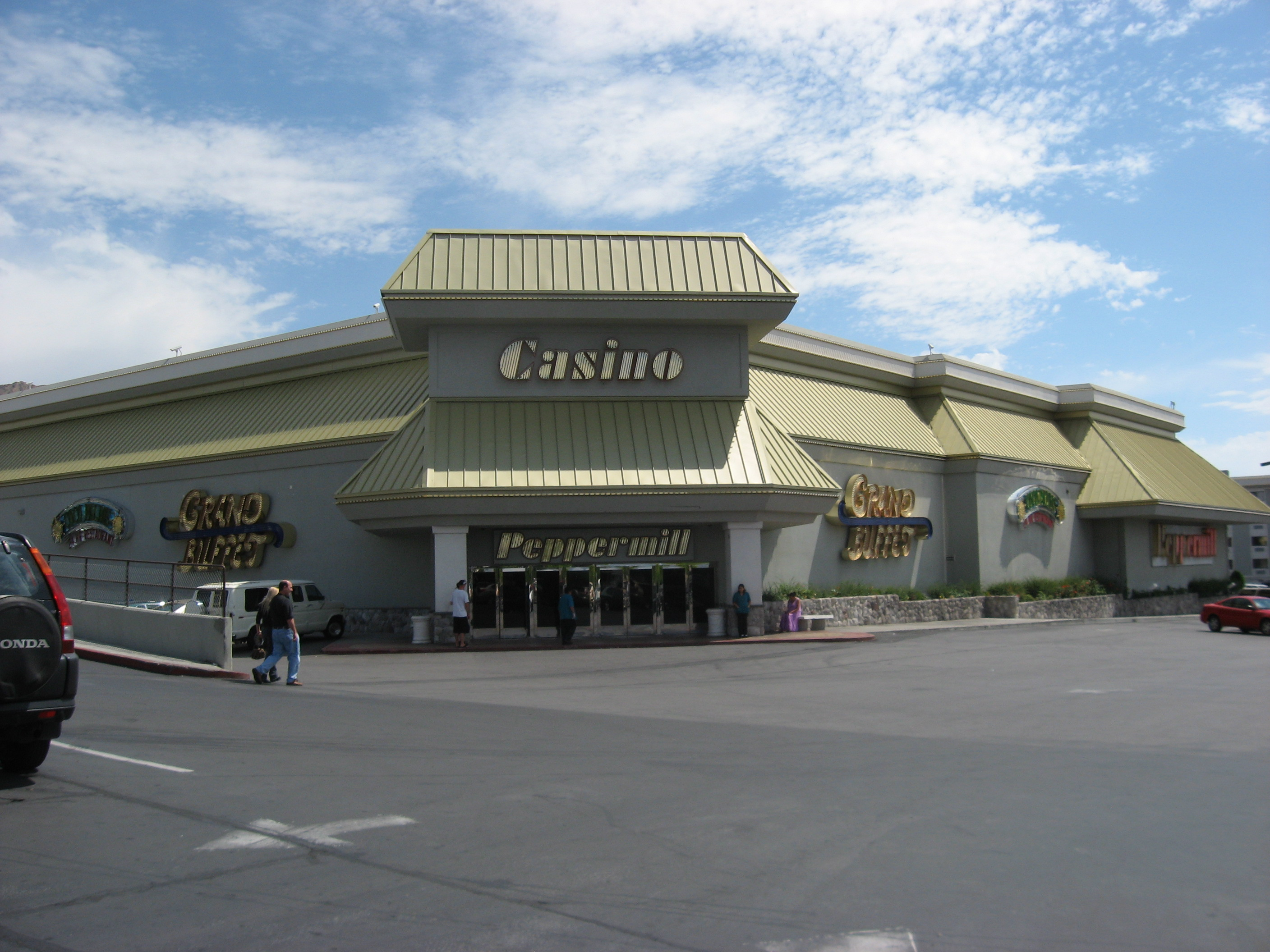
- Interactive map of Peppermill Wendover
- Location: West Wendover; 680 Wendover Boulevard West Wendover, NV 89883
- Opened: July 1985; 41 years ago
- No. of rooms: 382
- Gaming space: 35,880
- Casino type: Land-based
- Owner: Peppermill Casinos, Inc.
- Website: www.wendoverfun.com

Peppermill Wendover is a hotel and casino located in West Wendover, Nevada. This casino as well as Rainbow and the Montego Bay are owned and operated by Peppermill Casinos, Inc.

== History ==
The casino at this location was formerly known as the Hideaway Casino from 1976 to 1980 and the Gold Rush Casino from 1981 to 1984 and then in 1985 it was purchased by Peppermill Casinos, remodeled and reopened in July 1985.

== See also ==
- Peppermill Casinos
