= NextIO =

NextIO, Inc.
- Company type: Private
- Industry: Information Technology, Networking
- Founded: 2003
- Headquarters: Austin, Texas
- Website: none

NextIO, Inc was an information technology company based in Austin, Texas, providing solutions for PCIe expansion and I/O virtualization for traditional data centers and HPC environments. NextIO was considered one of the original founding contributors to the creation of the IOV space.

== History ==
NextIO was founded in 2003 by Brooks Ivey, K.C. Murphy, Gordon Burk, Jim Everett and Chris Pettey, however only Murphy, Ivey and Everett remained. The privately held company's initial funding was by Adams Capital Management, JK&B Capital, VentureTech Alliance, and Dell, Inc. Subsequent investment round participants included Crescendo Ventures. K. C. Murphy served as the company's president and chief executive officer, as well as its chairman of the board. According to their website, NextIO ceased operations on August 19, 2013.
