= Stateline Casino =

Historic casino in West Wendover, Nevada

Coordinates: 40.73486°N 114.04434°W

- Interactive map of Stateline Casino
- Location: West Wendover, Nevada
- Opened: 1931
- Closed: 2002
- Casino type: Land
- Owner: Wendover Nugget Casino

Stateline Hotel and Casino was located in West Wendover straddling the Nevada/Utah border.

== History ==
The owner of Stateline Casino was William "Bill" Smith, who started his business in 1926 as a service station. In 1931 when gambling was legalized in Nevada, Smith expanded his service station adding a hotel and casino. The hotel and casino straddled the official border between Nevada and Utah. For a long time there was a white line across the floor. A patron could eat on the Utah side then step over the line and gamble in Nevada. It began business in 1931 when gambling became legal again in Nevada after being outlawed on October 1, 1910 at midnight.

It closed in 1982 and reopened in 1985. In 2002 it was sold and renamed the Stateline Nugget. In 2004 it was sold again and renamed Wendover Nugget Hotel and Casino. The Wendover Nugget Hotel and Casino then donated Wendover Will, the 63 foot neon cowboy sign that had stood in front of the hotel since 1952 to the city of West Wendover. The city restored it and erected it in the city center.
