= Western Village =

Casino hotel in Nevada, United States

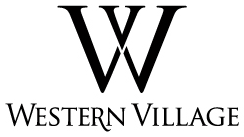

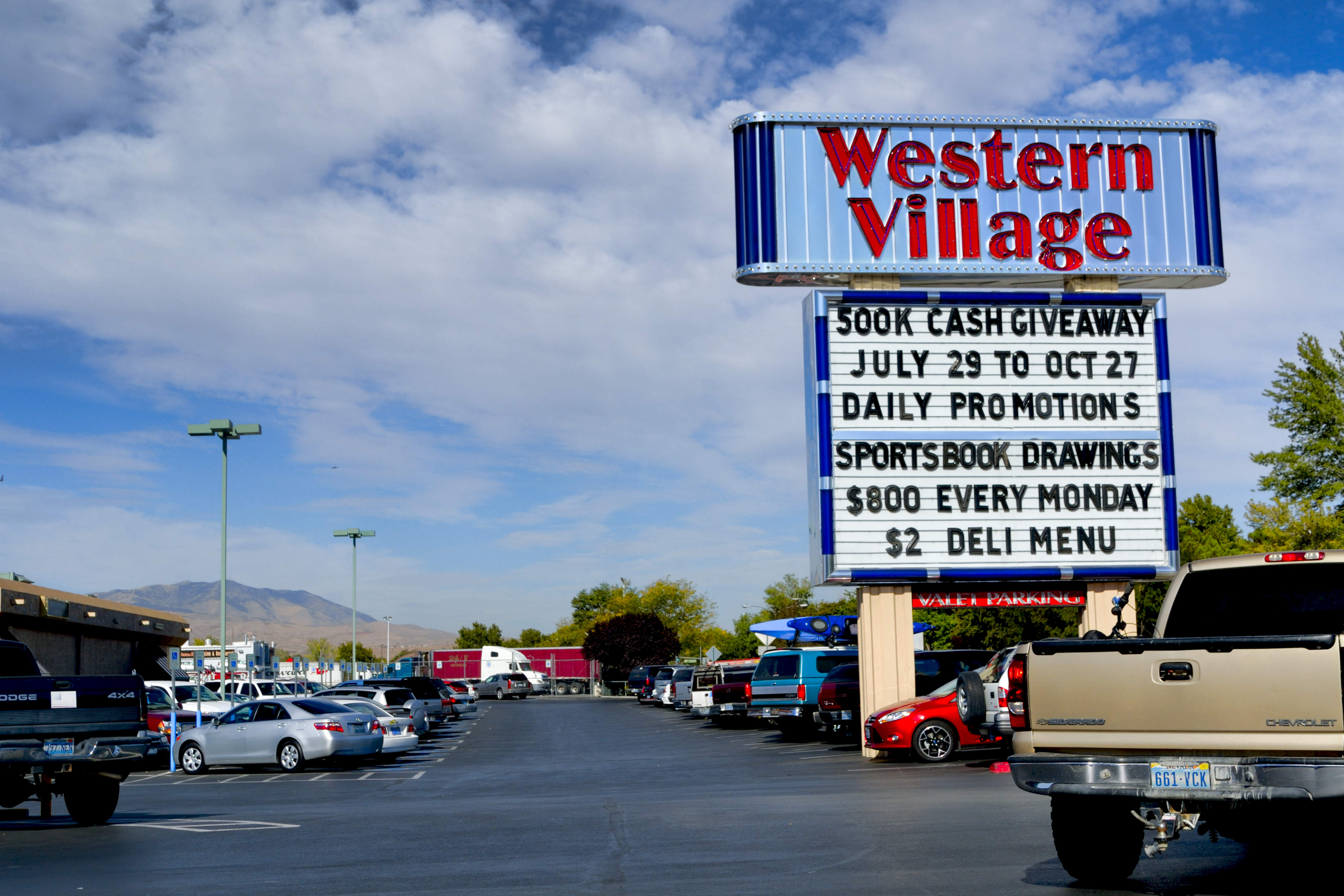
- Interactive map of Western Village
- Location: Sparks, Nevada, U.S.; 815 Nichols Boulevard; 39.5344°N 119.7343°W
- Opened: 1983; 43 years ago
- Theme: Tuscany
- No. of rooms: 147
- Gaming space: 26,452 sq ft (2,457.5 m^{2})
- Notable restaurants: Bars and Lounges; Café Bellini; Dining Specials; Pancho & Willie's; Primo; The Steak House
- Owner: Peppermill Casinos, Inc.
- Architect: Worth Group
- Renovated in: 1994
- Website: westernvillagesparks.com

Western Village is a hotel and casino located in Sparks, Nevada. It is owned and operated by Peppermill Casinos, Inc.
