= Peppermill (restaurant) =

American restaurant in Winchester, Nevada

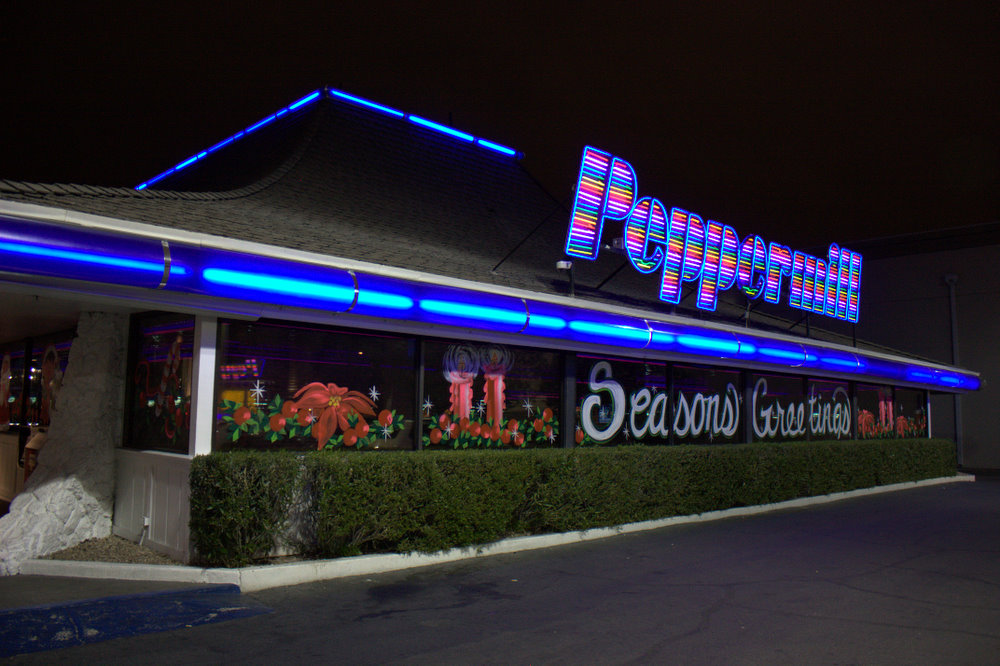
- The Peppermill in 2011
- Interactive map of Peppermill

Restaurant information
- Established: December 26, 1972
- Owner: Peppermill Casinos, Inc.
- Food type: American
- Location: 2985 South Las Vegas Boulevard, Winchester, Clark County, Nevada, 89109, United States
- Coordinates: 36.133665°N 115.163541°W
- Website: www.peppermilllasvegas.com

The Peppermill (Note: Sometimes known as the Peppermill Restaurant or Peppermill Inn.) is a restaurant located on the northern Las Vegas Strip in Winchester, Nevada. It opened on December 26, 1972, and features mostly American cuisine. The Peppermill is popular for its large portions, its interior design, and its Fireside Lounge. The restaurant and lounge are also well known among celebrities and have made various appearances in popular culture.

In 2024, the restaurant was named one of America's Classics by the James Beard Foundation.

== History ==
The restaurant originated with a Reno location, the Peppermill Coffee Shop and Lounge, in 1971. It was opened by Nat Carasali and Bill Paganetti, who later converted the restaurant into the Peppermill Reno resort.

The Peppermill restaurant in the Las Vegas Valley opened on December 26, 1972. It was built along the northern Las Vegas Strip. Despite the location, it is a standalone restaurant, not located within any resort. It has outlasted several nearby resorts, including the Desert Inn, the Stardust, and the Riviera.

Other Peppermill locations eventually opened in California, starting with Daly City in 1973. A Sacramento location opened three years later, followed by a Fresno restaurant around 1978. Other California locations included Concord and Cupertino. A restaurant in Corte Madera closed in 1996, followed by Sacramento and Fresno in 2001, leaving the chain with five restaurants in California. Another Peppermill, in Citrus Heights, closed in 2002. The chain also had two restaurants in Denver at some point. Like the Las Vegas restaurant, each location was leased on a long-term basis and then re-evaluated for possible renewal. According to Carasali, "The dynamics of your location change over 20 or 30 years. It has not (made) good business sense to sign up for another long-term lease (in some areas)."

As of 2002, the Las Vegas Peppermill had 120 employees. It is owned by Peppermill Casinos, Inc., and occupies 1.1 acre. The local Doumani family owned a 40-percent interest in the land until 2015, when they purchased the remainder. The restaurant's lease agreement was extended to 2027.

== Design ==
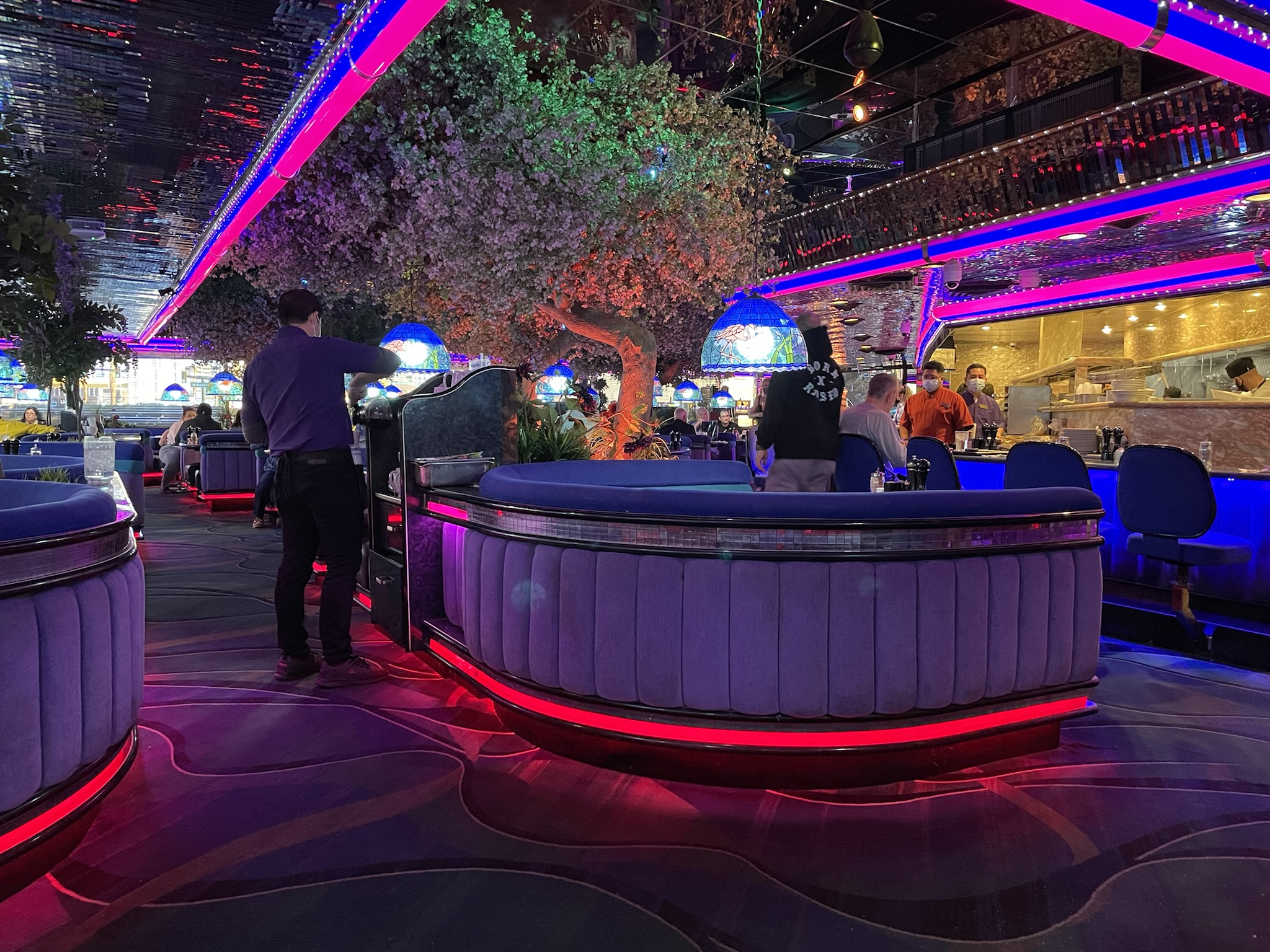
Restaurant interior, 2022

The Peppermill is noted for its retro 1970s appearance. The interior features a blue and purple color scheme, as well as neon lights, fake vegetation, and mirrored ceilings. Tiffany lamps are hung above the tables and feature a flamingo design.

The interior originally featured orange and brown colors, and wagon-wheel lamps above the tables. The color scheme would later become maroon and mauve, before settling on the current design. The restaurant's artificial cherry blossoms, added in the 1990s, came from the former Peppermill resort in Mesquite, Nevada. Kitchen upgrades and new carpeting, with the same design, were added in 2014. A new roadside sign was also added four years later, but the property's design has otherwise remained the same. The restaurant's rooftop sign was destroyed in a 2023 windstorm, and was replaced by an LED version as part of a year-long renovation and maintenance project, which mostly retained the interior design.

== Features and reception ==
Because of its 24-hour schedule, the Peppermill is popular as a late-night and early morning restaurant. It offers a typical coffee shop menu with more than 150 items, mostly consisting of American cuisine. The restaurant is known for its large portions, including its salads and 10-egg omelets.

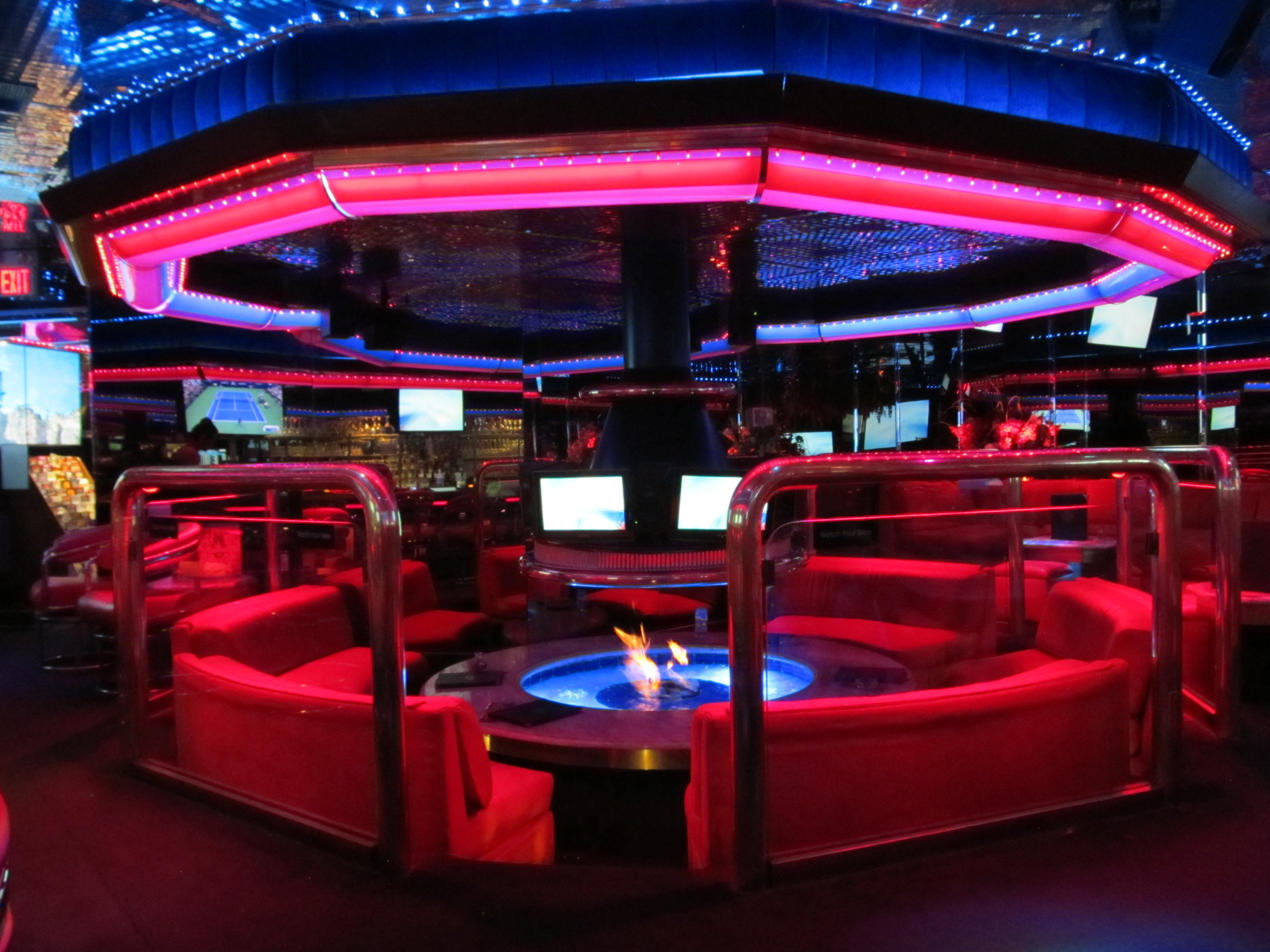
Fireside Lounge in 2019

The Peppermill includes the Fireside Lounge, which features a small body of water accompanied by flames that shoot from the center. The lounge is popular for its alcoholic beverages, including its 64-ounce Scorpion cocktail, and was also known for its red upholstery, replaced with gray during the 2023-24 renovation.

The property is popular among local residents, as well as tourists. In 2018, Al Mancini of the Las Vegas Review-Journal wrote that the Peppermill, with its distinctive interior, could "easily be dismissed as a tourist trap. But its quality 24-hour diner-style grub has made it a perennial post-work favorite of Strip graveyard shift workers."

The restaurant and lounge have also been frequented by celebrities, including singers Frank Sinatra and Elvis Presley, comedian Jerry Lewis, actress Debbie Reynolds, filmmaker Quentin Tarantino, boxer Floyd Mayweather, magician Criss Angel, mobster Frank Cullotta, and television personality Holly Madison. Comedian Penn Jillette is also a fan of the Peppermill, and while designing his Las Vegas home in the mid-1990s, he included a booth modeled after those at the restaurant.

The Peppermill is regularly featured on lists of the best restaurants in Las Vegas. It was included in KNPR's 2022 Restaurant Awards, tied in the "Hall of Fame" category with a local Italian restaurant. It has also won numerous accolades in the "Best of Las Vegas" awards, conducted annually by the Las Vegas Review-Journal. In 2024, the Peppermill received an America's Classics award from the James Beard Foundation.

== Popular culture ==
The Peppermill's restaurant and lounge have made various appearances in popular culture, including the 1984 film The Cotton Club, financed by the Doumanis. The property also appeared in the 1995 films Showgirls and Casino, and the 2016 film The Trust.

It has also been featured on television programs, including CSI: Crime Scene Investigation, Anthony Bourdain: No Reservations, and Comedians in Cars Getting Coffee. In addition, the lounge appears in the music videos for "Feel It Coming Back" (2014) by Santana and Diego Torres, and "Another Lonely Night" (2015) by Adam Lambert.

Jillette and fellow comedian Paul Provenza met at the Peppermill to discuss their film project The Aristocrats, eventually released in 2005. According to Jillette, the entire film "was thought out, laid out, planned, budgeted and scheduled" during their hours-long meeting.
