= Peppermill Reno =

Casino hotel in Nevada, United States

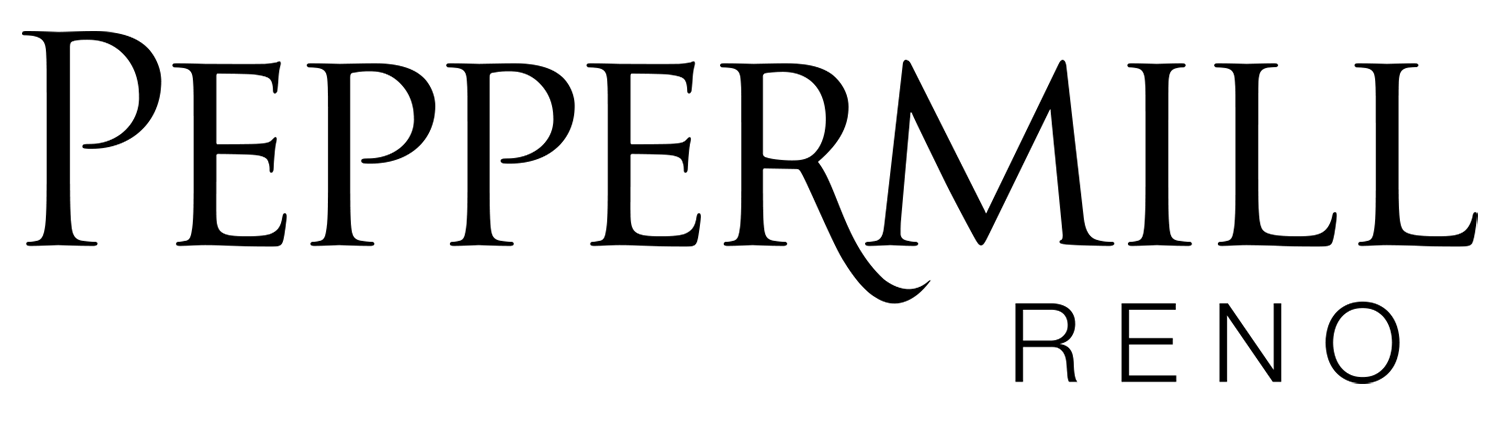

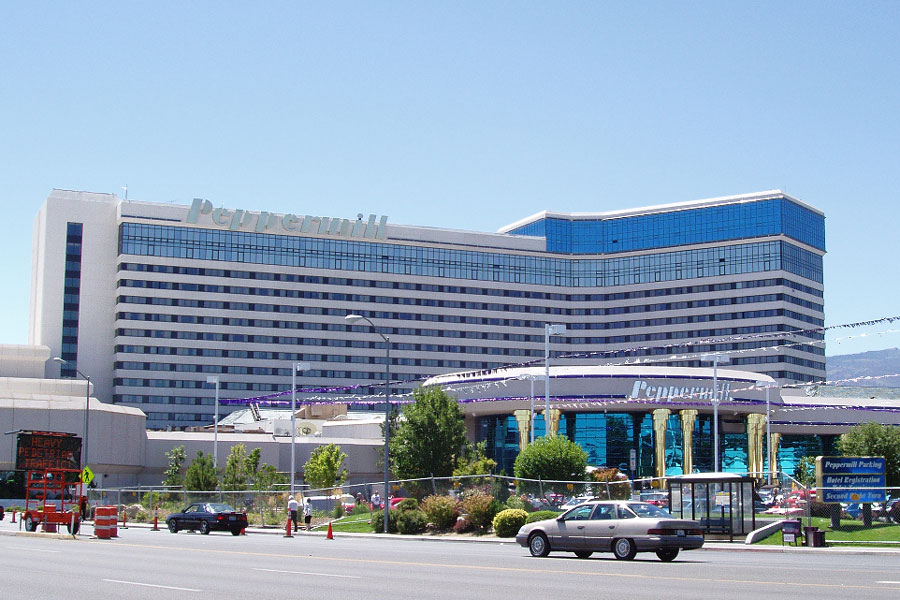
- Interactive map of Peppermill Reno
- Location: Reno, Nevada, United States; 2707 South Virginia Street; 39.497745°N 119.80145°W
- Opened: April 23, 1971; 55 years ago
- Theme: Tuscany
- No. of rooms: 1,621
- Gaming space: 107,272 sq ft (9,965.9 m^{2})
- Permanent shows: None
- Signature attractions: Game Lab Arcade; EDGE Nightspot; Spa Toscana
- Notable restaurants: Banyan Bar; Bimini Steakhouse; Biscotti's; Biscotti's Café; Café Espresso; Café Milano; Casino Bar; Chi; Chi Bar; Fireside Lounge; High Limit Slot Lounge; In Room Dining; Island Buffet (until 2020); Lobby Lounge; Oceano; Oceano Bar; Poker Bar; Romanza; Romanza Bar; Sole Poolside; Sports Bar; Sports Deli; The Pub; The Terrace; Video Cube Bar; Sabroso
- Owner: Peppermill Casinos, Inc.
- Architect: Marnell Corrao Associates; Peter B. Wilday Architects; Worth Group
- Previous names: The Peppermill Coffee Shop & Lounge
- Renovated in: 1979: Main Tower; 1996: Unknown; 2007: Tuscany Tower; 2009: Unknown; 2010: Unknown; 2011: Unknown; 2016: Oceano and EDGE Nightclub
- Website: peppermillreno.com

Peppermill Reno is a hotel and casino located in Reno, Nevada, United States. It is owned and operated by Peppermill Casinos, Inc.

== Background ==
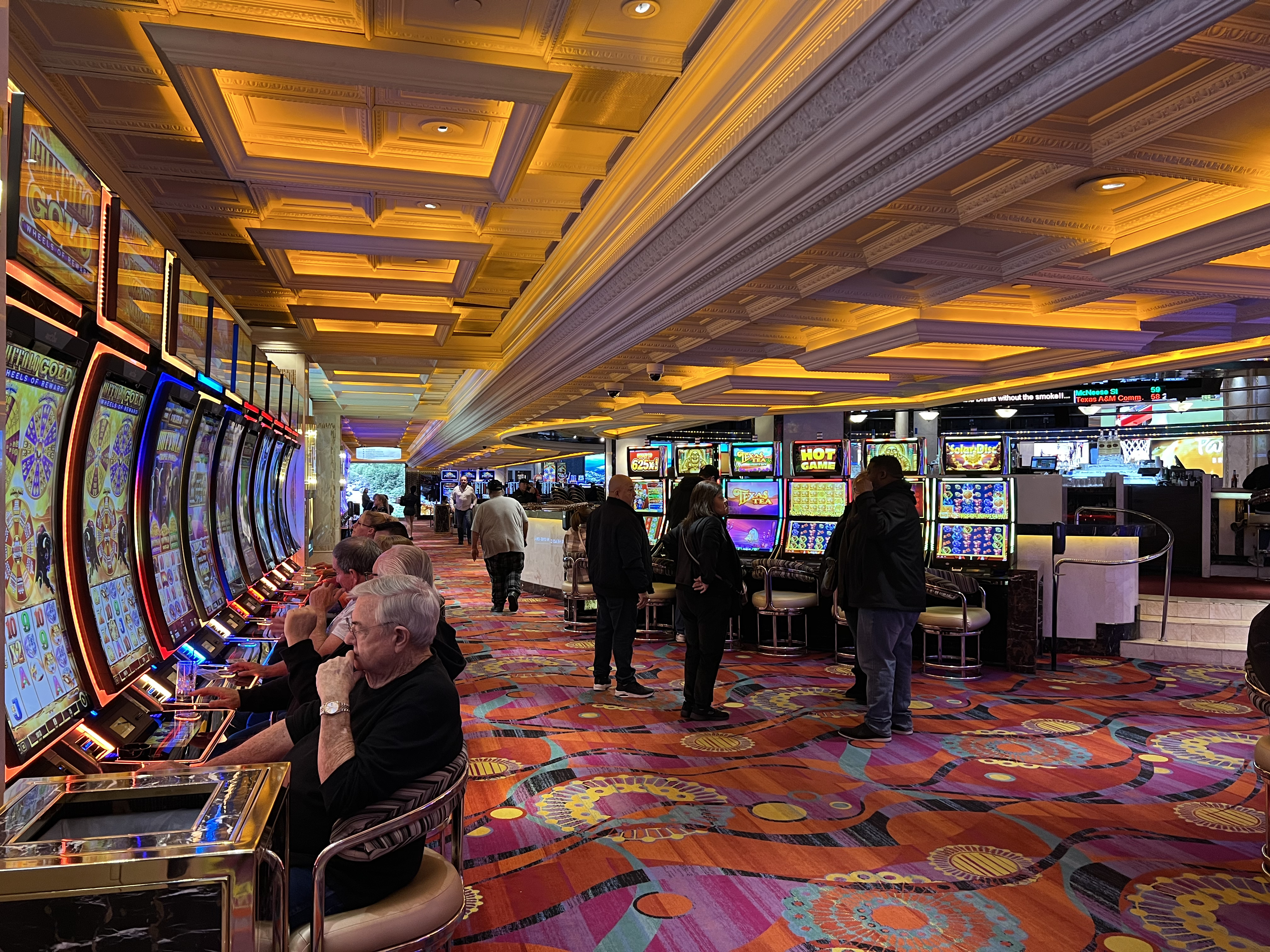
Casino floor at Peppermill

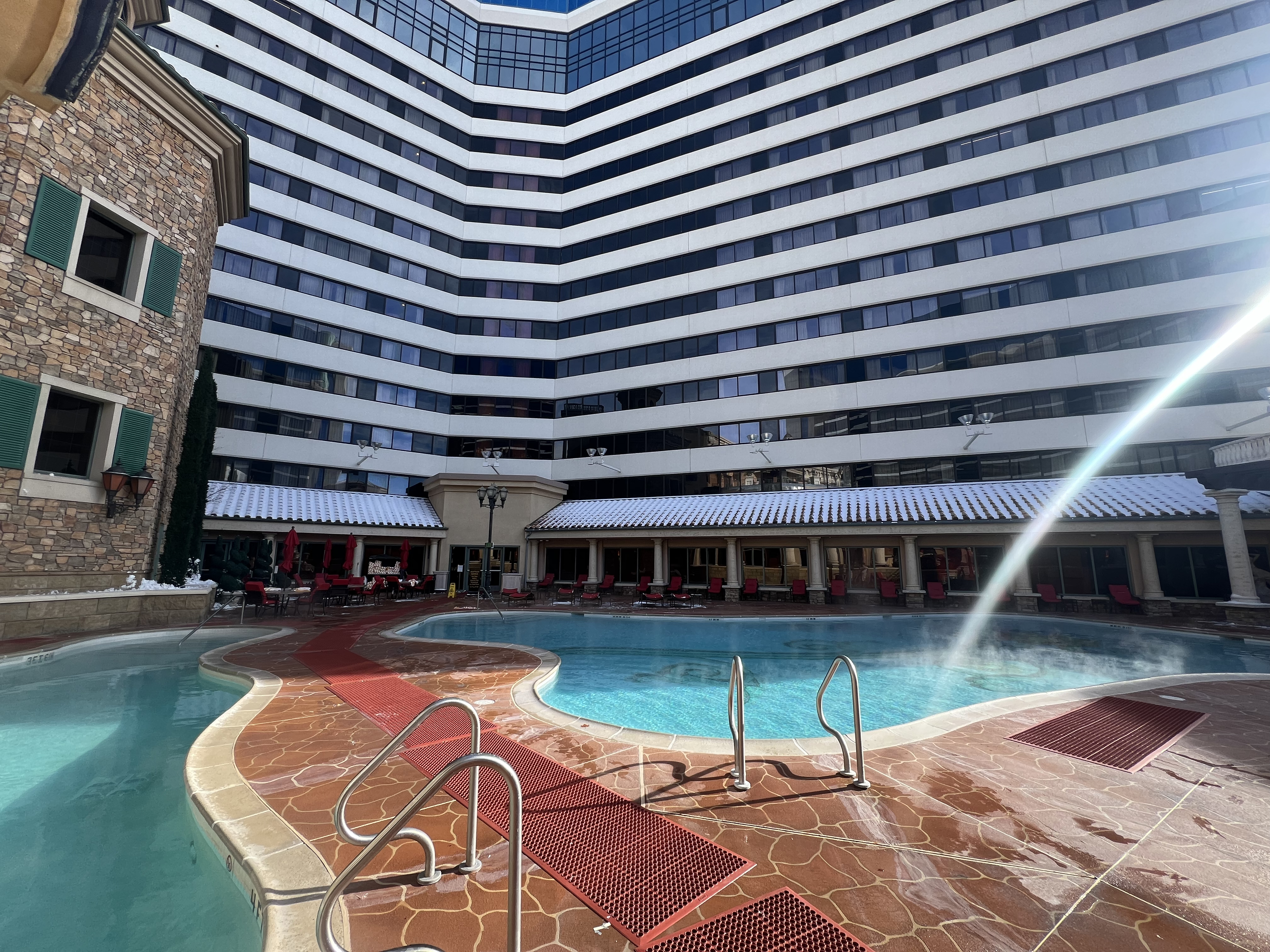
The pool at Peppermill

Peppermill Reno opened as Peppermill Coffee Shop and Lounge. Today, it has expanded to include a Tuscan themed pool deck, 1,623 hotel rooms, 785 suites, 10 restaurants, and 107,272 sq. ft. of convention space.

Restaurants include a 24-hour café; nightlife and entertainment options include 15 themed bars and lounges, and the Game Lab featuring both modern and retro arcade games, including a dedicated 1980s-themed "Retro Room".

Peppermill's Spa and Salon Toscana is a 33,000 square foot spa retreat with a caldarium including indoor pool, sun deck, and garden. 24 treatment rooms and a salon are available. The spa also includes a 9,500 square foot health club, two geothermally-heated, resort-style pools with private cabanas, and an outside bar.

The property has an overwhelmingly Tuscan theme, including the largest poker room in Reno with 19 tables and a VIP room, renovations to restaurants and a remodel of the casino floor. The privately held company consisting of five investors has also invested in the remodel of its Western Village in Sparks, Nevada also to a Tuscan motif.

=== History ===
Before Peppermill Reno grew into the resort, spa, and casino that it is today, the Peppermill Coffee Shop and Lounge was opened on April 23, 1971 by lifelong friends Nat Carasali and Bill Paganetti. The Peppermill expanded into gambling in 1979, and a small casino and motor lodge was opened in 1980. In 1986, the casino underwent a major expansion adding a convention center and hotel tower.

Planning for an expansion project began in 1999, with construction eventually starting in 2005. The $400 million expansion included the 600-room Tuscany Tower, which opened in December 2007.

The Peppermill expanded to Las Vegas, Nevada on December 26, 1972 with the opening of the Peppermill restaurant. To date, Peppermill Resort Spa Casino has not opened a hotel or resort in Las Vegas. Peppermill Resort Spa Casino further expanded by opening Western Village in Sparks, Nevada in 1983, the Rainbow Club in Henderson, Nevada, also in 1983, and a Peppermill Wendover in Wendover, Nevada in 1984.

In December 2023, founder Bill Paganetti died at 85 years old in Reno.

=== Entertainment ===
The Tuscany Center has had major acts perform including Donna Summer, Foreigner, and Tiësto.

=== Dining ===
The Peppermill Resort Spa Casino offers a variety of restaurant dining options from casual to fine dining.

=== Geothermal energy ===
In 2009, the Peppermill began a project to heat its property with geothermal energy. A geothermal well was drilled just north of its Tuscany Tower. In September, drilling was completed, with the well tapping into a reservoir of hot water 4,421 ft (1,348 m) deep, averaging approximately 170 °F (77 °C). A temperature of at least 165 °F (74 °C) is required to be efficient enough to replace four boilers which had previously supplied all of the property's heating. In addition to providing all of the domestic heating needs of the facility (with the exception of the laundry facility, as well as a few dishwashers which still require natural gas), the wells provide some of the cooling for the facility. Completion of the project was in early 2010. A reinjection well had already been constructed on the property just west of the marquee during a prior expansion. An additional reinjection well was also constructed to the south of the existing reinjection site, at the far southeastern corner of the resort's property (the most recent well is at the northwest corner of the property), allowing for the maximum possible distance between the extraction and reinjection sites. The Peppermill was planned to be the only hotel in the United States for which the heating is provided solely by geothermal energy derived on their immediate property. In October 2009, the Peppermill hosted the Geothermal Resources Council (GRC) and GEA Trade Show.

While the temperature of the well is not high enough to generate steam, an experiment was conducted which proved that electricity could be generated with the well. At 160 °F (71 °C), the well was only able to produce 270 KW of electricity, well below the 9 to 10 MW required to power a facility of its size. A similar system is used several miles to the south at the Steamboat Springs. Using such a system, the Peppermill could generate 3 to 4 MW of power, to be used during peak energy periods.

== 2023 Wrongful Detention Incident ==
In 2023, Peppermill Resort Spa Casino was the subject of public criticism after an artificial-intelligence facial recognition software casino security was using falsely identified patron Jason Killinger as a previously trespassed guest.

Despite providing valid government-issued identification, as well as UPS pay stubs to prove his identity, Killinger was detained by casino security and later arrested by Reno Police Department officers, who relied on a "99.9% confidence score" that Killinger was Michael Ellis, a patron previously disbarred for sleeping on the premises. Killinger was held by Reno Police for several hours, until fingerprint evidence proved Killinger was not the patron they had initially thought. The charges were ultimately dropped for being unfounded, but Killinger retains a criminal record as a result.

Following the incident, Killinger filed lawsuits against the Peppermill Resort Spa Casino, settling in 2024 for an undisclosed amount. Killinger also sued Reno Police Department responding officer Richard Jager for wrongful detention and violation of his 14th Amendment rights, alleging that Jager rejected his identity documents, despite Killinger being 4 inches taller than Michael Ellis, and accused him of "probably having a DMV hook-up" which enabled him to possess fake identification.

After body-cam footage of the ordeal became public in 2025, the incident drew public scrutiny around the use of artificial intelligence and facial recognition, as well as both the casino and police rejecting physical evidence in favor of claims made by AI security software. Civil rights advocates and technology professionals raised concern about the risks associated with overreliance on automated decision-making.

== Logo history gallery ==
Below is a collection of former logos used by the resort over the years. Dates of use for each logo is listed below each photo

1971–2008

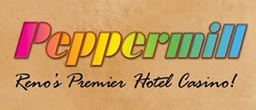
1971–2008

2008–2009

2009–2013

2013–2017
