= Maverick Gaming v. United States of America =

2022 lawsuit over tribal sports betting

Maverick Gaming v. United States of America is a lawsuit filed by Maverick Gaming that contests an agreement granting exclusive rights to sports betting for Native American tribes within the U.S. state of Washington.

== Background ==
In 2018, following the U.S. Supreme Court's decision to nullify a federal prohibition on sports betting, states gained the autonomy to establish their individual regulations. Subsequently, in 2020, the Washington legislature opted to permit sports wagering exclusively on Native American territories. Advocates asserted that tribal governments possessed the necessary competence for supervising responsible gaming, while concurrently circumventing extensive proliferation. Tribal entities assert that Maverick Gaming's lawsuit transcends sports betting, claiming that weakening Washington's gaming compacts could endanger their sovereignty. This controversy coincides with a Supreme Court review of a challenge against the Indian Child Welfare Act, with both legal disputes being represented by the same law firm.

=== Maverick Gaming ===
Maverick Gaming LLC is an American casino company based in Kirkland, Washington. It operates 22 card rooms, 1,200 hotel rooms, about 1,700 slot machines and 43 table games in Nevada and three casinos in Colorado. It is led by Eric Persson, a citizen of the Shoalwater Bay Tribe. Maverick filed for Chapter 11 bankruptcy, on July 14, 2025, then announced the closure of four of its card rooms in the Seattle area.

=== Gibson Dunn ===
Matthew McGill, a lawyer from the law firm Gibson Dunn, who represented Citizens United in the 2010 Supreme Court case, took on the Brackeens' case pro bono. He advocated for them before the U.S. Supreme Court in November. The law firm is also known for representing Chevron in the enduring lawsuit initiated by Indigenous communities in Ecuador, and Energy Transfer Partners, the entity responsible for the Dakota Access Pipeline.

In January 2022, McGill filed the Maverick lawsuit.

== History ==
In January 2022, Maverick Gaming filed a lawsuit accusing state and federal officials of favoring a "discriminatory tribal gaming monopoly." Maverick sought to invalidate Washington's 2020 sports gambling law, which took effect in September 2021, and to halt wagering until legislation expanded gambling rights beyond tribal entities. However, tribal entities contend that Maverick's lawsuit transcends sports betting, asserting that any challenge to Washington's gaming compacts could jeopardize their recognition as sovereign nations. Supporters and legal specialists argue that the Maverick case, along with similar ones, risk reviving the Termination Era policies from the 1950s, during which the U.S. government attempted to permanently dissolve the political status of Indigenous tribes.

In August 2022, the Shoalwater Bay Indian Tribe initiated a legal motion against the company in the federal court in Tacoma, aiming to invalidate Maverick Gaming's federal sports betting and gambling expansion lawsuit. In the submitted document, the Shoalwater Bay Tribe's attorneys state that Persson, through his plea for relief in the current litigation, aims to dismantle the primary source of employment and discretionary revenue for his own Tribe. Consequently, the Tribe is obliged to pursue limited intervention in this case and put a stop to his attempts to undermine the Tribe's endeavors to attain economic self-sufficiency and deliver sufficient governmental services to its members.

US District Judge David Estudillo dismissed the lawsuit, siding with the Shoalwater Bay Tribe, whose motion to intervene argued that Washington tribes were the lawsuit's actual target. The court's decision thus reaffirms tribal gaming compacts and exclusivity in Washington State.

In September 2023, a coalition of 22 Native American tribes urged the Ninth Circuit in an amicus brief to reject an appeal from Maverick Gaming LLC. The tribes contend that Maverick Gaming is trying to bypass the tribes' sovereign immunity by suing state and federal officials.

On December 13, 2024, the Ninth Circuit affirmed the U.S. District Court's decision.

On May 9, 2025, Maverick Gaming filed a petition for a writ of certiorari with the Supreme Court of the United States, seeking review of the Ninth Circuit's decision. The federal respondents, the Shoalwater Bay Indian Tribe, and state respondents filed briefs in opposition on August 27, 2025, and the case was distributed for the Court's September 29, 2025 conference. On October 6, 2025, the Supreme Court denied the petition for certiorari, leaving the Ninth Circuit's ruling in place.
