= West Wendover, Nevada =

Place in Nevada, United States

West Wendover
- City
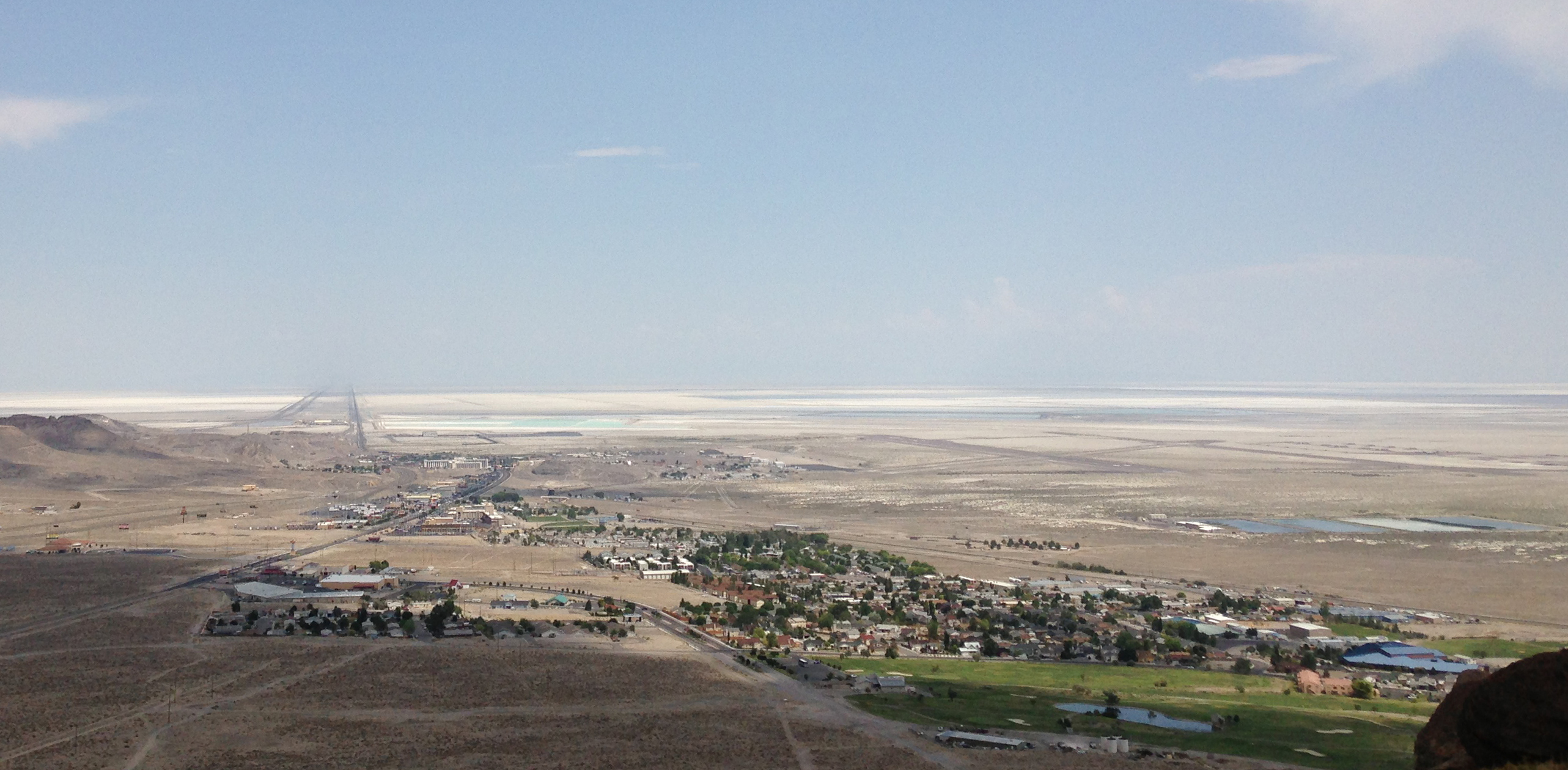
- West Wendover, Nevada viewed from a hill west of town

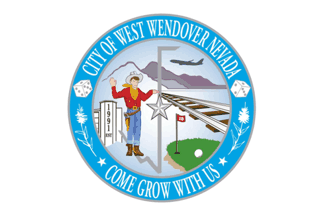
- Flag Seal
- Nickname: A Young City... An Old History, Where the West Begins
- Motto: Come Grow with Us
- Interactive map of West Wendover
- Location within Nevada Location within the United States
- Coordinates: 40°44′52″N 114°04′42″W
- Country: United States
- State: Nevada
- County: Elko

Area
  - Total: 7.48 sq mi (19.37 km^{2})
  - Land: 7.48 sq mi (19.37 km^{2})
  - Water: 0 sq mi (0.00 km^{2})
- Elevation: 4,524 ft (1,379 m)

Population (2020)
  - Total: 4,512
  - Density: 603.4/sq mi (232.97/km^{2})
- Time zone: UTC−7 (Mountain (MST))
  - Summer (DST): UTC−6 (MDT)
- ZIP code: 89883
- Area code: 775
- FIPS code: 32-83730
- GNIS feature ID: 2412232
- Website: Official website

West Wendover is a city in Elko County, Nevada, United States. The population was 4,512 at the 2020 census. It is part of the Elko micropolitan area. West Wendover is located on the eastern border of Nevada and the western edge of the Great Salt Lake Desert and is contiguous with Wendover, Utah, with which it is sometimes confused. It is home to five casinos and a cannabis dispensary which attract many visitors from neighboring Utah, where both casino gambling and non-medical cannabis are illegal. Interstate 80 runs just north of the cities, while Interstate 80 Business (Wendover Boulevard) runs through the two cities.

== History ==
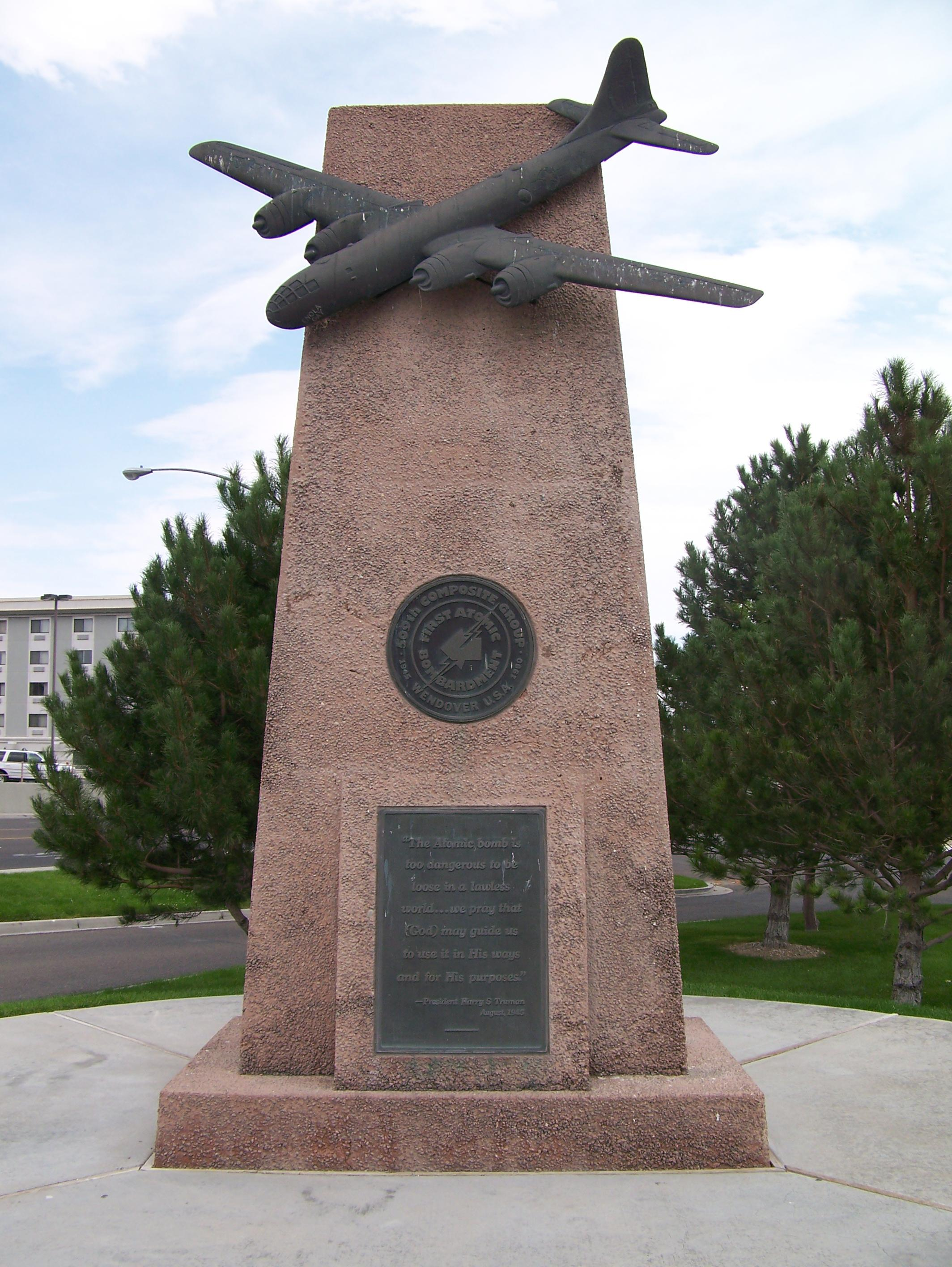
United States Army Air Force Monument in West Wendover

West Wendover began to develop in the 1930s and 1940s with the introduction of legalized gambling in the state of Nevada. William "Bill" Smith founded a small cobblestone service station for travelers crossing the desert terrain of western Utah and eastern Nevada. Today this facility is known as the Wendover Nugget. It held the record as the oldest continually operated gaming license for a casino in the state of Nevada for over 66 years, until December 2001, when the former State Line Casino and Hotel came under new ownership.

Through the 1970s and 1980s, West Wendover began to emerge as a destination resort. Additional business arrived constructing more casinos, hotels and other service establishments, as well as recreational venues, such as the Toana Vista Golf Course. As growth continued to spiral up, the citizens of West Wendover, Nevada, then a township of Elko County, elected to incorporate under self-rule. On July 1, 1991, the city of West Wendover, Nevada came into existence. Amber S Holt named the city seal of West Wendover encouraging people to "Come Grow With Us."

In October 1999, the U.S. Department of Transportation moved West Wendover out of the Pacific Time Zone due to the strong economic ties between West Wendover and neighboring Utah. This made the city of West Wendover the only portion of Nevada legally in the Mountain Time Zone. The communities of Jackpot, Jarbidge, Mountain City, and Owyhee in northern Elko County also observe Mountain Time, but only on an unofficial basis.

West Wendover extensively uses generated tax revenue from the gambling industry in Nevada to fund city services and improve schools.

Residents in both cities have voted to annex Wendover into Nevada, saying they are one community that has been divided for too long. Some politicians in both the State of Utah and the State of Nevada have endorsed the idea, but the U.S. House of Representatives resolution permitting Wendover to leave Utah and join Nevada was stalled in the U.S. Senate in 2002 and did not become law. However, the politicians in Wendover, Utah, placed a permanent halt to the annexation process through a vote on November 15, 2006. The motion made was to halt the annexation process. The vote was a tie, with two councilmembers voting to halt the process and two supporting the continuation of the process. The tie vote was broken up by a vote of Wendover, Utah mayor Brett Shelton who voted to discontinue the annexation process. Previously, West Wendover had decided to halt any further work after Wendover, Utah indicated they were going to discuss and make a decision as to whether or not they would proceed. Article IV, Section 3 of the U.S. Constitution requires that any change in state boundaries be approved by the U.S. Congress as well as by the two state legislatures.

In December 2019, West Wendover's first recreational cannabis dispensary opened. Because non-medical cannabis is illegal in bordering Utah, the dispensary mainly serves Utah residents visiting the town.

== Geography ==
According to the United States Census Bureau, the city has a total area of 7.5 sq mi (19 km^{2}), all land.

=== Climate ===
Wendover and West Wendover have a cool arid climate (Köppen BWk) with hot summers, freezing winters, and substantial diurnal temperature ranges. The cities’ location east of the Ruby Mountains makes them the driest in the Great Basin, averaging only 4.58 inches or 116 millimetres of precipitation per year, or about half that of nearby Ely or Elko. It affects snowfall even more dramatically: Wendover and West Wendover average only 5.5 inches or 0.14 metres of snow, one-eighth to one-tenth the snowfall of the two nearby county seats.

Climate data for Wendover Air Force Base (1991–2020 normals, extremes 1911–2017, 2025–present)
Month	Jan	Feb	Mar	Apr	May	Jun	Jul	Aug	Sep	Oct	Nov	Dec	Year
Record high °F (°C)	64 (18)	80 (27)	81 (27)	92 (33)	103 (39)	105 (41)	112 (44)	109 (43)	103 (39)	90 (32)	78 (26)	69 (21)	112 (44)
Mean daily maximum °F (°C)	35.1 (1.7)	42.5 (5.8)	54.0 (12.2)	61.5 (16.4)	71.8 (22.1)	83.1 (28.4)	92.5 (33.6)	90.3 (32.4)	78.2 (25.7)	62.4 (16.9)	46.5 (8.1)	35.5 (1.9)	62.8 (17.1)
Daily mean °F (°C)	27.3 (−2.6)	33.9 (1.1)	43.4 (6.3)	51.0 (10.6)	60.9 (16.1)	71.1 (21.7)	79.9 (26.6)	77.4 (25.2)	66.2 (19.0)	51.7 (10.9)	37.4 (3.0)	27.6 (−2.4)	52.3 (11.3)
Mean daily minimum °F (°C)	19.6 (−6.9)	25.3 (−3.7)	32.9 (0.5)	40.5 (4.7)	50.0 (10.0)	59.2 (15.1)	67.4 (19.7)	64.6 (18.1)	54.1 (12.3)	40.9 (4.9)	28.4 (−2.0)	19.8 (−6.8)	41.9 (5.5)
Record low °F (°C)	−16 (−27)	−12 (−24)	8 (−13)	18 (−8)	26 (−3)	31 (−1)	43 (6)	34 (1)	28 (−2)	18 (−8)	5 (−15)	−18 (−28)	−18 (−28)
Average precipitation inches (mm)	0.25 (6.4)	0.17 (4.3)	0.33 (8.4)	0.36 (9.1)	0.58 (15)	0.28 (7.1)	0.22 (5.6)	0.16 (4.1)	0.50 (13)	0.34 (8.6)	0.22 (5.6)	0.19 (4.8)	3.60 (91)
Average precipitation days (≥ 0.01 in)	3.5	3.0	2.7	4.1	4.1	3.1	2.3	2.2	3.3	2.9	2.5	2.3	36.0
Source: NOAA

== Demographics ==
Historical population
Census	Pop.	Note	%±
1990	2,007		—
2000	4,721		135.2%
2010	4,410		−6.6%
2020	4,512		2.3%
U.S. Decennial Census

=== 2020 census ===
As of the 2020 census, West Wendover had a population of 4,512. The median age was 29.1 years. 34.6% of residents were under the age of 18 and 7.7% of residents were 65 years of age or older. For every 100 females there were 102.0 males, and for every 100 females age 18 and over there were 101.5 males age 18 and over.

92.9% of residents lived in urban areas, while 7.1% lived in rural areas.

There were 1,480 households in West Wendover, of which 51.1% had children under the age of 18 living in them. Of all households, 47.8% were married-couple households, 19.7% were households with a male householder and no spouse or partner present, and 23.0% were households with a female householder and no spouse or partner present. About 21.1% of all households were made up of individuals and 6.3% had someone living alone who was 65 years of age or older.

There were 1,581 housing units, of which 6.4% were vacant. The homeowner vacancy rate was 2.0% and the rental vacancy rate was 6.2%.

Racial composition as of the 2020 census
Race	Number	Percent
White	1,750	38.8%
Black or African American	14	0.3%
American Indian and Alaska Native	109	2.4%
Asian	70	1.6%
Native Hawaiian and Other Pacific Islander	5	0.1%
Some other race	1,752	38.8%
Two or more races	812	18.0%
Hispanic or Latino (of any race)	3,054	67.7%

=== 2010 census ===
As of the 2010 United States census West Wendover had a population of 4,410. The racial and ethnic makeup of the population was 61.7% Hispanic or Latino, 33.8% non-Hispanic white, 0.3% non-Hispanic black, 1.2% non-Hispanic Native American, 1.3% non-Hispanic Asians, 0.7% non-Hispanic Pacific Islanders, 0.2% non-Hispanics reporting some other race and 4.1% reporting two or more races.

=== 2000 census ===
As of the 2000 census, there were 4,721 people, 1,363 households, and 1,046 families residing in the city. The population density was 629.8 inhabitants per square mile (243.2/km^{2}). There were 1,626 housing units at an average density of 216.9 units per square mile (83.7 units/km^{2}). The racial makeup of the city was 70.96% White, 0.68% African American, 2.27% Native American, 0.59% Asian, 0.04% Pacific Islander, 22.75% from other races, and 2.71% from two or more races. Hispanic or Latino of any race were 56.85% of the population.

There were 1,363 households, out of which 55.3% had children under the age of 18 living with them, 58.0% were married couples living together, 10.1% had a female householder with no husband present, and 23.2% were non-families. 17.5% of all households were made up of individuals, and 2.1% had someone living alone who was 65 years of age or older. The average household size was 3.46 and the average family size was 3.97.

In the city, the population was spread out, with 39.0% under the age of 18, 12.6% from 18 to 24, 30.3% from 25 to 44, 16.1% from 45 to 64, and 2.1% who were 65 years of age or older. The median age was 24 years. For every 100 females, there were 109.9 males. For every 100 females age 18 and over, there were 108.6 males.

The median income for a household in the city was $34,116, and the median income for a family was $34,297. Males had a median income of $23,281 versus $18,105 for females. The per capita income for the city was $12,013. About 17.4% of families and 16.9% of the population were below the poverty line, including 19.5% of those under age 18 and 3.9% of those age 65 or over.

== Economy ==
West Wendover has five main casino hotels:

- Red Garter
- Wendover Nugget
- Rainbow
- Peppermill
- Montego Bay

== Arts and culture ==
West Wendover has a public library, a branch of the Elko-Lander-Eureka County Library System.

== Education ==
Its school district is the Elko County School District.
