= Parqués =

Colombian strategy board game, variant of Pachisi

Parqués (Spanish pronunciation: [paɾ'kes]) is the Colombian version of a board game in the cross and circle family (the category that includes Pachisi). The game is described as a "random thinking" game: the moves depend on the roll of the dice but players must consider possible strategies before executing their move. The objective of the game is to advance all the pieces to the end. Once in the safety zone, players can use two dice until they are one space away from home, where they will then use just one die.

== Colombian culture ==
Parqués is the Colombian version of Parcheesi, which itself is a version of Pachisi (which originated in India). The meaning of the word may be a translation of "Pachisi", also influenced by similar games such as Parcheesi. Parqués as a word in another context has no meaning. Although it could be argued that the game's origin is Spanish (from Parchís) due to the similarity between both games, there is wide agreement in Colombia that the game is completely Colombian. Parqués stems directly from Pachisi in the same way as Parcheesi, Parchís or Ludo. There is no proof to the claim that it stems from a country other than India, up to date. Moreover, no Parqués game is played in any other Latin American countries. Parqués is a mixture of the original Indian game and the influences of local Colombian culture.

In Colombia, people from all parts of the country play the game and there are local variations of it. It is very popular; played by both children and adults. Adults usually play the game by betting money on the first piece, on capturing pieces, or on winning the game, to make gameplay more interesting. There are boards for 4, 6 and 8 players. The boards usually contain pictures of soccer teams, singers, actors, or other cultural figures on the jail boxes. Also, most boards are made by fans of the game, by drawing and framing them.

The board itself is usually placed on a box covered by glass. The use of glass is to allow dice to be thrown more easily. There are versions of the board that are made of paper to make it portable.

== Gameplay ==
Regular parqués board for four players

Parqués is played with two dice; two to eight players can compete in the same match, depending on what type of game board is used. Each player is given four pieces and uses a specific color. That color is useful to identify the pieces, the jails and the arrival squares of each player. The most common colors are red, blue, yellow and green, usually arranged in that order. The game can also be played with fewer than four pieces.

The jail box is where the pieces are placed at the beginning of the match and it is where they go whenever an opponent "captures" them. The player throws the dice three times and attempts to get a pair in order to "free" the pieces.

Once the pieces are freed, they are placed in a special box next to the jail. This box is called "home", or "salida" (literally, "exit" in Spanish. It means it is the place where the pieces exit or get out of the jail).

If a player does not roll any pairs during their turn, the dice are passed to the player on the right. Otherwise, the first player frees the pieces and wins an extra turn to move them. The player throws again and must move the points of the dice with either one or two pieces.

For example:

The player rolls 5-3

- The player can move 8 squares forward with one piece or
- The player can move 5 squares with one piece and 3 with another

If some points cannot be used, they are forfeited. After the player makes a move, the turn must be passed to the player on the right (anti-clockwise)

The pieces cannot advance backwards, and they cannot be in any of the four boxes before their home box.

== Throws and turns ==
Each player can throw the dice once. There are some exceptions to this rule:

- If the player has all their pieces in jail, they can throw up to three times until they free them with a pair. If doubles are not rolled during the three tries, they pass the turn.
- If the player throws a pair during any turn, they win an extra turn.
- If the player throws three consecutive doubles, they are rewarded by moving any piece of theirs to the goal. If the die hits a chest piece the person who rolled has to roll again

== Capturing pieces ==
The player can capture an opponent's piece by placing their own piece on the same box as the other player's piece. However, they cannot capture a piece that is on a safe or a home box. Capturing in Colombia is called "eating" ("comer" in Spanish). The captured piece is sent to the player's jail (nest).

However, the player can capture pieces on their home box. When they free any piece from jail, the pieces placed on their home are captured, that is, sent to their jail, losing all their advances.

When a player avoids capturing a piece, it usually happens by mistake. On that case, an opponent must point the mistake out to all the players. The piece that did not capture its opponent goes to jail. Capturing opponents is mandatory and therefore takes priority above any other possible plays including the chance to leave jail.

== Special boxes ==
There are three types of special boxes.

- Home: (Salida) where the pieces are placed when freed.
- Safe: (Seguro) the pieces cannot be captured on this box
- Arrival: (Llegada) a player must move their pieces through nine final boxes to win the game. These boxes are usually the same color as that player's pieces. The ninth box is the last box in the game for each person. If a piece reaches that box, it is removed from the game. When all of a player's pieces are out of the game, the player wins.

== Variations ==
- Vuelta obligada (mandatory restart): If the player has their piece near the end and they get the exact value to capture a piece in the four boxes before their home box, they must capture it and move that piece from there in subsequent moves, losing all the advance of the piece.
- Cielo robado (stolen heaven): if the player gets the exact value to capture a piece on alien arrival boxes, they can win the game from there, as if the boxes were their own arrival point.
- De piedra en piedra (from stone to stone): the player can only move their pieces on the safe and home boxes. Thus, they can only move when the dice values are exactly 7, 5, 10 or 12, depending on the position of their pieces. Capturing can only be done in safe boxes, never in a home box.
- Con Policía (with policeman): An additional piece is placed on each safe and players are able to capture pieces by moving this "policeman" to the position required. If a player fails to realize the move, their most advanced piece is sent to jail. Sometimes, to make things more interesting, the policeman is allowed to move backwards as well.

== Comparison to similar games ==
=== Parcheesi ===
- Parcheesi is also played with two dice and it has the same goal: be the first to advance all the pieces to the end.
- Parqués has 8 safe boxes and 96 in total; Parcheesi has 16 and 68, respectively.
- In Parcheesi, doublets (pairs) also have the same special purpose (getting an extra turn).
- Capturing is done the same way.
- In Parcheesi, 5 has a special meaning, allowing one to get pieces out of the nest. It is different from Parqués, where 5 is a regular value.
- It is not possible in Parcheesi to have more than two pawns in the same square; Parqués has no restriction of this type.
- Parcheesi has blockades, supporting different variations concerning the way to break them.
- If all the pawns are outside the jail, the values below the dice can also be used. For example, if the player gets 6-6, 1-1 can be moved as well. For example, with two pawns they could move 7 with one pawn and 7 with another one. With 3 pawns they could move 6-1-7, respectively. With 4 they could move 6-6-1-1. Therefore, with this type of play, the player would always move 14. If none of the 14 moves can be used, the turn is forfeited.
- If a player gets three consecutive doublets, they can get a pawn out of the game, as in Parqués.
- After eating a pawn, it is possible to advance the score left with the same pawn (this is forbidden in Parqués)
- When a player sends another player's pawn to jail, they gain 20 points that they may move with only one of their pawns.
- When a pawn gets the arrival square, the player gains 10 points they can use to move a single pawn. If they cannot do it, the points are lost.

Variations by country:

- Človeče nehnevaj sa: Slovakia
- Člověče nezlob se: Czech Republic
- Ludo: England
- Mens erger je niet: The Netherlands
- Mensch ärgere Dich nicht: Germany
- Non t'arrabiare: Italy
- Parcheesi, Sorry!, Trouble: United States
- Parchís: Spain
- Petits-Chevaux: France
