= Boule (gambling game) =

Gambling game similar to roulette

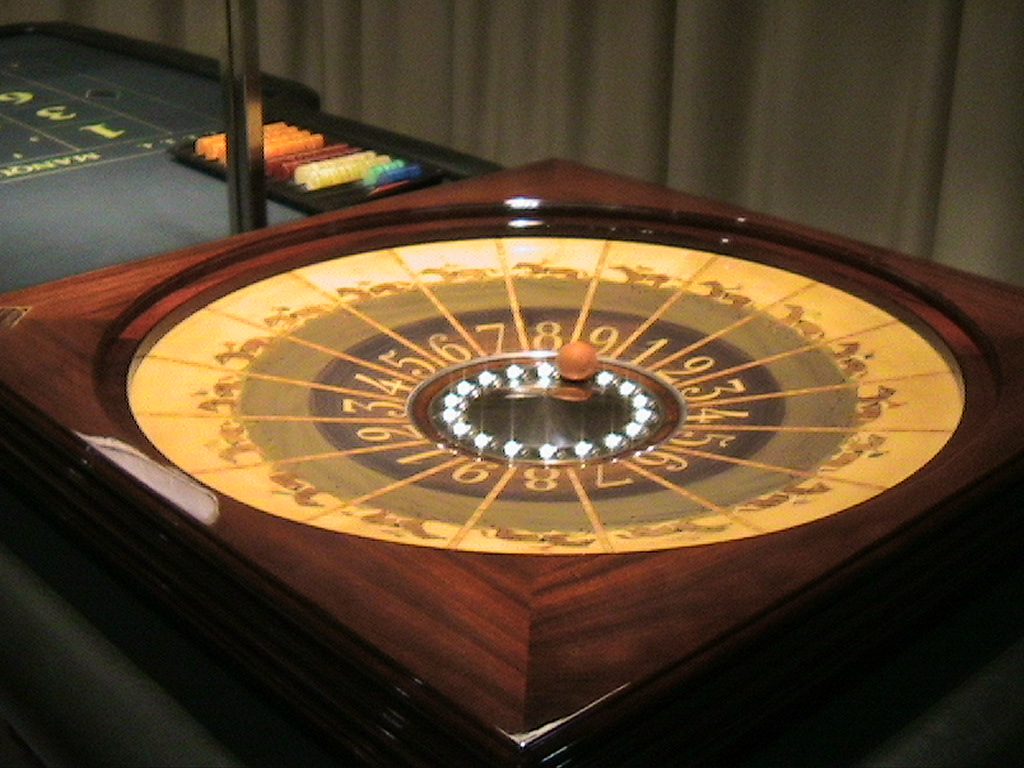
The pockets of many Boule wheels are decorated with horses recalling the Petits-Chevaux.

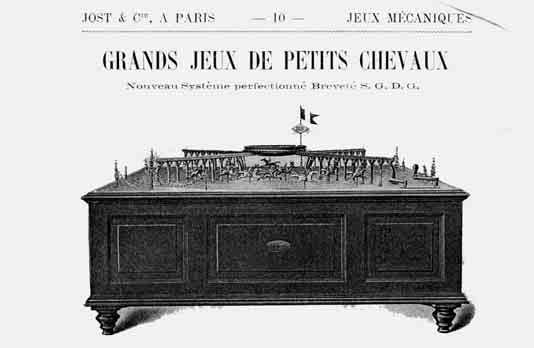
Picture from the catalogue of the firm of Jost, Paris, 1905 (at the Swiss Museum of Games)

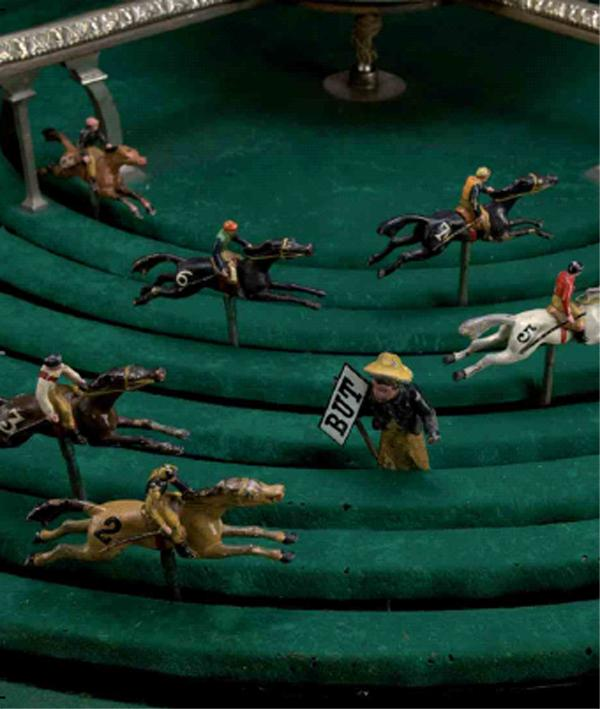
Detailed shot of the Petits-Chevaux table at the Swiss Games Museum.

Boule (French for 'ball') is a gambling game, similar to roulette, that dates back to the popular 19th-century game of Petits-Chevaux ('Little Horses').

== Playing ==
The wheel is divided into 18 pockets which are numbered from 1 to 9, each number occurring twice. The numbers 1, 3, 6 and 8 are black, while the numbers 2, 4, 7 and 9 are red, and 5 is yellow.

Instead of the ivory ball used in roulette, a rubber ball is used in Boule.

=== Betting options ===
==== Even odds ====
- Rouge (red: 2, 4, 7, 9) - Noir (black: 1, 3, 6, 8)
- Pair (even: 2, 4, 6, 8) - Impair (odd: 1, 3, 7, 9, except the 5)
- Manque (low: 1, 2, 3, 4) - Passe (high: 6, 7, 8, 9)

The number five corresponds to the zéro in roulette: if the boule falls on the five, all simple chance bets are lost.

==== Better than even odds ====
- Plein: a bet on a single number, paid at 7:1.
- Cheval: a bet on any two numbers, paid at 3:1.

=== House advantage ===
The overall house advantage for all forms of betting in Boule is $\frac{1}{9}$ = 11.11%.

Boule is thus rather disadvantageous for the punter; by comparison, in European roulette, the house advantage for simple chance play is 1.35%, and the house advantage for multiple chance play is 2.70%.

Boule is played for low stakes compared to roulette, especially in resorts where there is no concession for the Grand Jeu, i.e. a casino.

== Petits Chevaux ==
In Petits Chevaux, also called Jeu des Petits Chevaux or Rösslispiel, there are the same betting options as in Boule. The winning number is not chosen, however, by throwing a ball, but by a mechanical device that simulates a horse race en miniature.

Petits Chevaux was the predecessor of Boule. The pockets of many Boule wheels are decorated with pictures of horses in commemoration of Petits Chevaux. Around 1900 Petits Chevaux was a very popular casino game. A surviving gaming table by the firm of J. A. Jost (Paris c. 1905) is displayed in the Swiss Museum of Games in La Tour-de-Peilz. Until 2003, a similar game, the horse roulette game of Klondyke, was played in Baden-Baden's casino at the time of the Iffezheim Races. The gaming apparatus is housed today in Baden-Baden's Municipal Museum.

In France the name "Petits Chevaux" is also used for a variant of Pachisi or Mensch, ärgere dich nicht; the playing stones are in the shape of knights; see Jeu des petits chevaux.

== In popular culture ==
Boule figures in the short story The Tuppenny Millionaire by P G Wodehouse, first published in The Strand Magazine in October 1912, and in the story collection The Man Upstairs published in January 1914 by Methuen & Co. George meets his fiancée as he is playing boule in the south of France.

== See also ==
- Multicolore

== Literature ==
- Ralph Tegtmeier: Casino. Die Welt der Spielbanken, Spielbanken der Welt. DuMont, Cologne, 1989, ISBN 3-7701-2225-9 (Bildband)
- The Complete Hoyle’s Games. Revised & updated by Lawrence H. Dawson, London 1950, Wordsworth Reference, reprint 1994, ISBN 1-85326-316-8
- Thierry Depaulis: Die "Kleinen Pferde". Ein Casinospiel der Belle Epoque, in: U. Schädler (Hrsg.): Spiele der Menschheit. 5000 Jahre Kulturgeschichte der Gesellschaftsspiele, WBG, Darmstadt, 2007, ISBN 978-3-534-21020-6, pp. 173–179
