= Vendéen Palet =

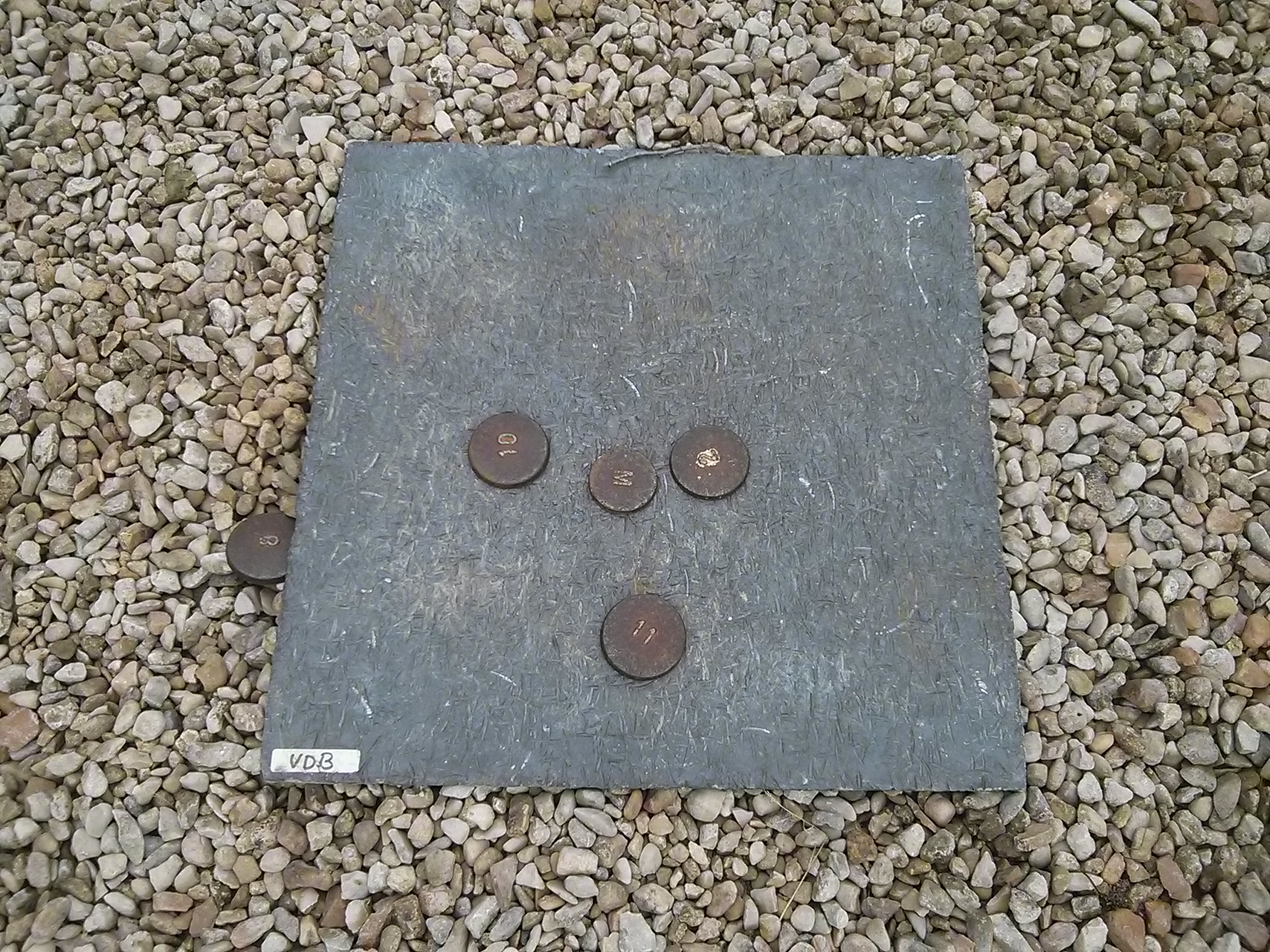
Cast iron palets on a lead plank

Palet on a lead plank also called Vendéen's Palet is a very popular palet game, an outdoor shuffleboard game, in the departement of Vendée, as well as the bordering departments of Deux-Sèvres, Maine-et-Loire, Charente-Maritime and Loire-Atlantique in the west of France. Palet on a lead plank is part of the National Federation for Rural Sports ("Fédération Nationale du Sport en Milieu Rural" in French) under the name "Palet fonte/laiton" (Palet Cast iron/brass).

== Required equipment ==
Each team has six "palets" or disks. Each palet is numbered in order to be identified on the plank. A last palet, called the master or "le petit" (the little), is smaller and often of a different color from the other palets. The plank is 45 cm squared, at least 20 kg, and made of lead.

== Rules ==
=== Goals ===
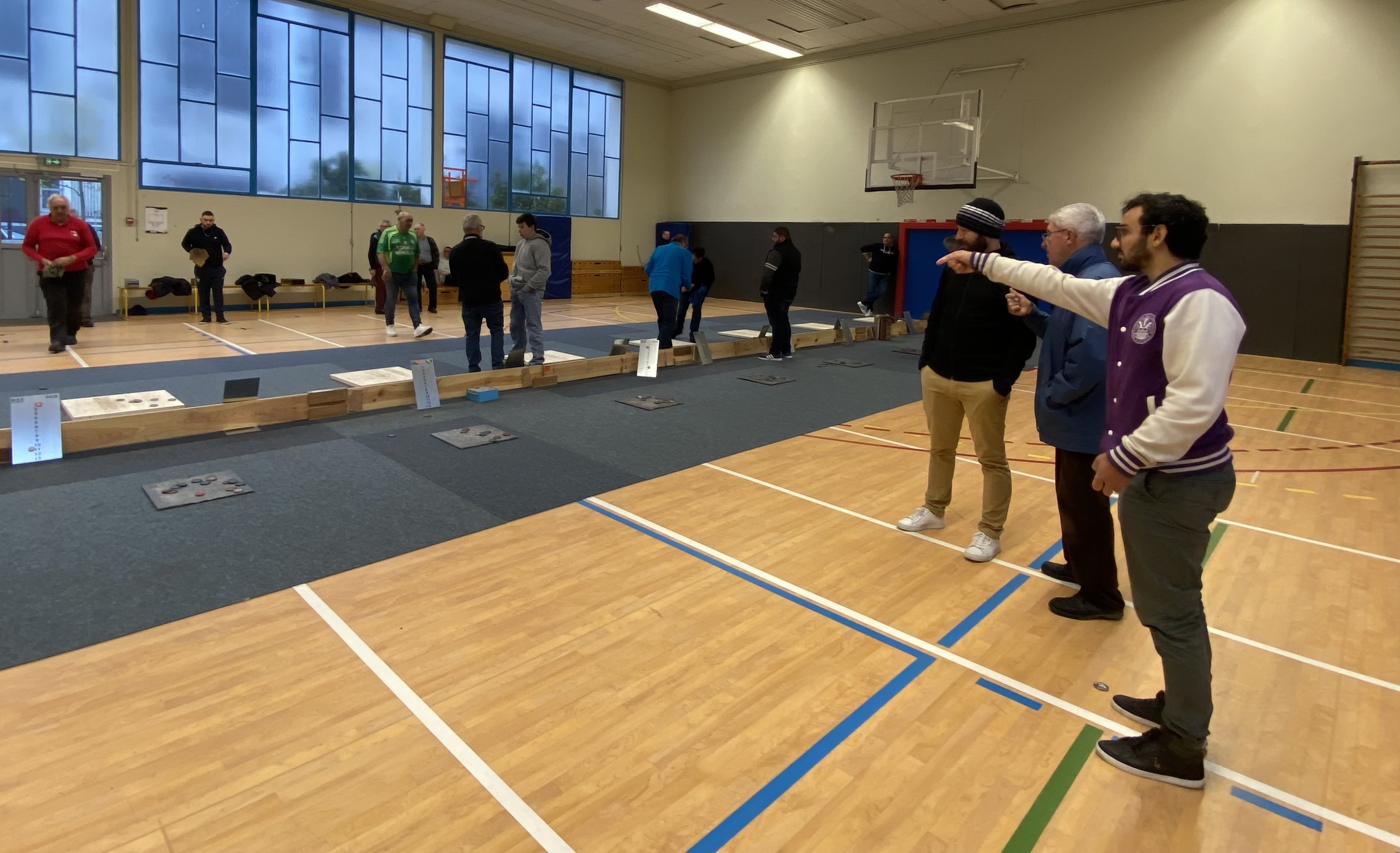
A Vendéen palet player.

The Vendéen Palet is played to 11 or 13 points, 15 in final, in teams of 1 to 3 players. The goal is to throw the palet as close as possible to the master, without touching the floor, on the plank located 380 cm away from the thrower for cast iron palets or at 280 cm away for brass palets. Each palet placed on the plank close to the master thrown by a same team scores points.

=== Scoring ===
Each palet that is closer to the master than the closest palet of the other team scores one point.
