= Sjoelen =

Traditional game now played as a sport

Sjoelen is a traditional table shuffleboard game originating in the Netherlands. The game is played on a long, narrow, tabletop board called a sjoelbak, which has four slots or gates through which players attempt to slide thirty discs (also called pucks or stones) in three sub-turns. The game has similarities with bagatelle, curling and shove ha'penny... Since 1977, sjoelen has been a competitive sport (also known as sjoelsport), driven by the Algemene Nederlandse Sjoelbond (ANS).

== The Sjoelbak ==
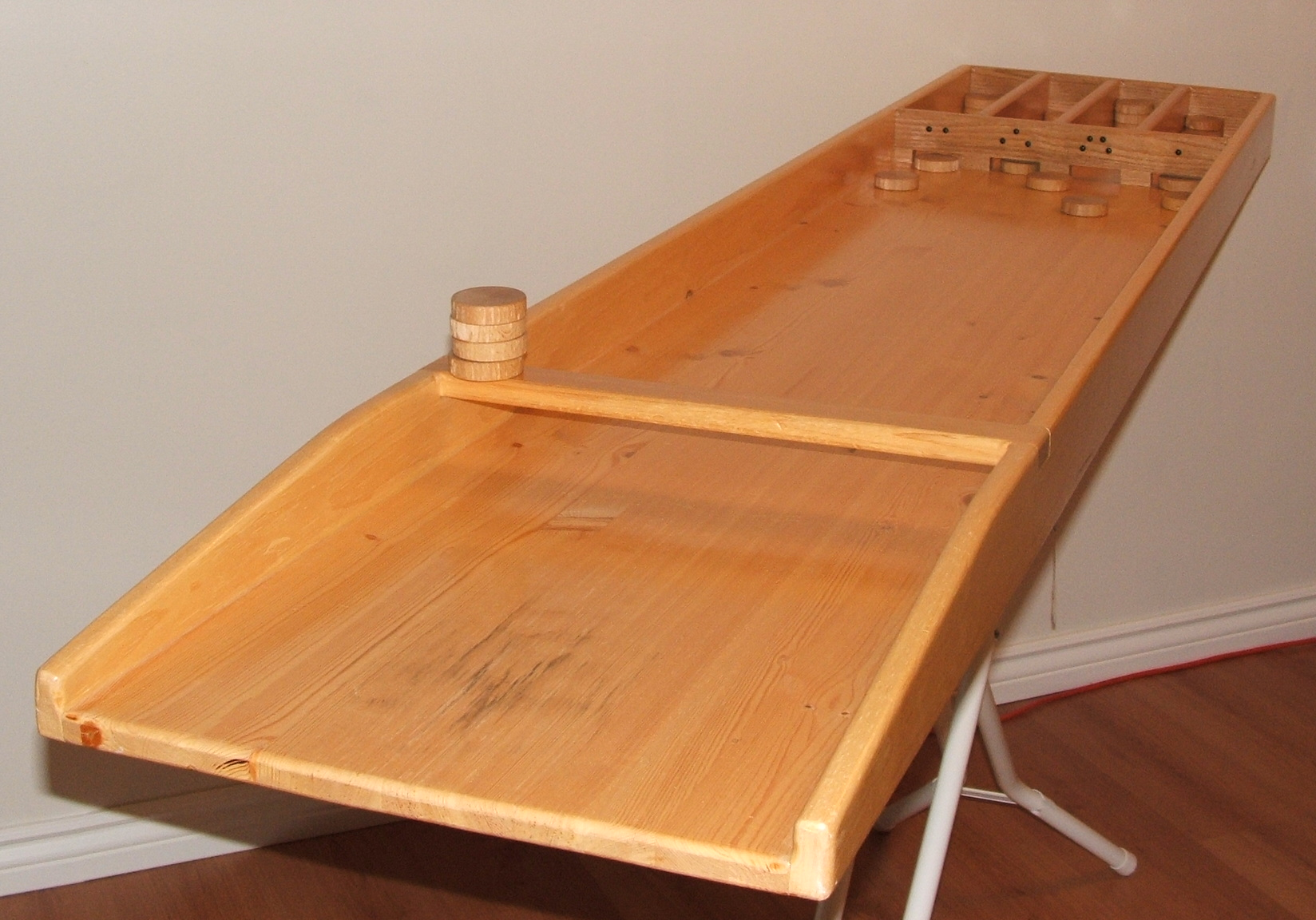
A sjoelbak

A sjoelbak (plural: sjoelbakken) is typically 2m long, approximately 40 cm wide and has sides that are between 5.5 cm and 6.5 cm tall, depending on the model. One end is open, for the player to slide the discs, and has a bar joining the top of the side pieces to denote the start line of the playing area. At the other end, there is a gate line with four slots through which players attempt to slide the discs. The slots are numbered (from left to right) 2, 3, 4, 1. Sjoelbakken are made of wood and mass-produced boards are marketed by, among others, Schilte, Heemskerk Sport, Engelhart and Homas.

== Rules ==
There are several rule systems for sjoelen. The most common requires a player to slide thirty discs down the sjoelbak with the aim of getting them through the slots and into the boxes at the far end of the board. After the player has used all thirty discs (the first sub-turn), any that have not gone through the slots are returned to them and they have a second sub-turn; this is repeated for a third sub-turn. Once all three sub-turns are complete, the player's score is calculated.

=== Scoring ===
The basic scoring rule is that each disc that is wholly past the front of a slot will count for the number of points for that slot - from left to right, 2, 3, 4, 1. However, if a player gets one disc into each slot, then those discs count double and the player will get 20 points instead of 10. Therefore, the maximum score in three sub-turns is 148, comprising seven discs in each slot plus the two remaining discs in the 4 slot. If a player gets 148 in fewer than three sub-turns, they will get one additional disc to slide for each sub-turn they didn't use, making the maximum possible score 156 (148 in the first sub-turn and each of the two bonus discs in the 4 slot).

=== Other formats ===
==== 20-2 ====
In some competitions (including the knock-out stages of the Sjoelen World Cup), the 20-2 format is used. This variant requires a player to slide only 20 discs down the sjoelbak and they have just two sub-turns. Scoring follows the same principles, but the maximum score in two sub-turns is 100 (five discs in each slot), with a maximum possible score of 104 if the player gets 100 points in one sub-turn and gets a 4 with their bonus disc.

== Countries Where Sjoelen is Played ==
Players from fourteen countries competed in the 2023 Sjoelen World Cup. This increased to eighteen countries in the 2024 Sjoelen World Cup.

- Belgium: one player from Belgium played in the 2023 Sjoelen World Cup. Three players participated in the 2024 Sjoelen World Cup.
- Czechia: in Czechia, the sport is known as Holandsky Billiard (Dutch billiards). One player from Czechia played in the 2024 Sjoelen World Cup.
- Ireland: Ireland entered a sjoelen team in the 2023 Sjoelen World Cup and the 2024 Sjoelen World Cup.
- France: in France, the sport is known as sjoelbak and is administered by Les Amis du Sjoelbak. It is principally played in the Alsace region, particularly in the area around Strasbourg. France hosted the 2024 Sjoelen World Cup. In France, the sport is registered as part of French intangible cultural heritage (in French, patrimoine culturel immatériel) by the Ministry of Culture.
- Germany: in Germany, the sport is known as both sjoelen and jakkolo (after Jakko Schmidt, who first made the game famous in Germany). The sport is administered by the Deutscher Jakkolo Bund.
- Italy: the 2024 Sjoelen World Cup saw the first participation by an Italian team.
- Netherlands: sjoelen in the Netherlands is administered by the ANS, a membership organisation for sjoelen clubs. The ANS organises leagues, cup competitions and national championships and was the host for the 2023 Sjoelen World Cup. The ANS is affiliated with the NOC*NSF (the Netherlands Olympic Committee).
- Norway: one Norwegian player participated in the 2024 Sjoelen World Cup. This was the first time Norway had been represented.
- Philippines: the Philippines entered a team in the 2023 Sjoelen World Cup and one player participated in the 2024 Sjoelen World Cup.
- Poland: the Polish Sjoelen Team participated in the 2023 Sjoelen World Cup and the 2023 Sjoelen World Cup.
- Portugal: the 2024 Sjoelen World Cup saw the first participation by a Portuguese team.
- Slovakia: after taking time away from the Sjoelen World Cup, Slovakia returned with a team in the 2024 edition.
- South Korea: in South Korea, the sport is administered by the Korean Sjoelen Association and the Korean Disabled Sjoelen Association. There are over 100,000 active players in South Korea.
- Suriname: the Surinamese sjoelen team comprises players living in the Netherlands.
- Sweden: the sport is known as jakkolo in Sweden and is administered by Team Sweden Jakkolo.
- Switzerland: the sport is known as sjoelen in Switzerland.
- United Kingdom: the sport is administered by Sjoelen UK in the United Kingdom. The United Kingdom sent its first ever representatives to the 2023 Sjoelen World Cup.
- United States: the United States team is organised by Rochester Sjoelen Club in Rochester, New York. United States players participated in the 2023 Sjoelen World Cup and the 2024 Sjoelen World Cup.

Teams from Syria have participated in previous Sjoelen World Cups. There is a sjoelen club in Mallorca, Spain and the sport is also played in Argentina.

== Sjoelen World Cup ==
The first Sjoelen World Cup took place in 2008 in Heerhugowaard, Netherlands and was followed with another edition in 2009 in Egmond aan Zee, Netherlands. Since then, a competition has taken place every two years, except during the coronavirus pandemic, which delayed the 2021 event to September 2023. In May 2024, a catch-up competition (to make up for the coronavirus delay) was played in Bischheim, France.

=== World Cup Results ===
Year	Location	Men's Individual Results	Women's Individual Results	Team Results
2008	Heerhugowaard, Netherlands	1. Dick Eijlers (NL); 2. Jan Oostenbrink (NL); 3. Siem Oostenbrink (NL)	1. Nelly Eekhof (NL); 2. Geesje van der Linde (NL); 3. Ellen Bekker (NL)	1. Netherlands 1; 2. Netherlands 2; 3. Netherlands 3
2009	Egmond aan Zee, Netherlands	1. Dick Eijlers (NL); 2. Johan Mosterd (NL); 3. Tim van Sommeren (NL)	1. Jacqueline Heijnis (NL); 2. Geesje van der Linde (NL); 3. Nelly Eekhof (NL)	1. Netherlands; 2. Germany; 3. Belgium
2011	Hude, Germany	1. Martin van den Heuvel (NL); 2. Moritz Tschörtner (DE); 3. Siem Oostenbrink (NL)	1. Geesje van der Linde (NL); 2. Simone Frijlink (BE); 3. Nelly Eekhof (NL)	1. Netherlands; 2. Germany; 3. Belgium
2013	Lisse, Netherlands	1. Siem Oostenbrink (NL); 2. Ronald Polman (NL); 3. Cock Tukker (NL)	1. Elly Mensen (NL); 2. Simone Frijlink (NL); 3. Geesje van der Linde (NL)	1. Netherlands; 2. Germany; 3. Suriname
2015	Vendryne, Czechia	1. Siem Oostenbrink (NL); 2. Dick Eijlers (NL); 3. Moritz Tschörtner (DE)	1. Geesje van der Linde (NL); 2. Joke Schagen (NL); 3. Nelly Eekhof (NL)	1. Netherlands; 2. Germany; 3. Sweden
2017	Lampertheim, France	1. Siem Oostenbrink (NL); 2. Dick Eijlers (NL); 3. Andries Duinkerken (NL)	1. Ida Maytum (NL); 2. Bea Sneller (NL); 3. Elly Mensen (NL)	1. Netherlands; 2. Germany; 3. Sweden
2019	Hude, Germany	1. Stefan Kiwiet (NL); 2. Siem Oostenbrink (NL); 3. Dick Eijlers (NL)	1. Carmen Harms (DE); 2. Sandra Stoelhorst (NL); 3. Joke Schagen (NL)	1. Netherlands; 2. Germany; 3. Sweden
2023	Beneden-Leeuwen, Netherlands	1. Siem Oostenbrink (NL); 2. Wim Kiwiet (NL); 3. Jarno Langerak (NL)	1. Elly Mensen (NL); 2. Ida Maytum (NL); 3. Jacquelien Klunder (NL)	1. Netherlands; 2. Sweden; 3. Germany
2024	Bischheim, France	1. Jan Oostenbrink (NL); 2. Siem Oostenbrink (NL); 3. Bert van Stein (NL)	1. Carmen Harms (DE); 2. Jacquelien Klunder (NL); 3. Marjolein Duifhuis (NL)	1. Netherlands; 2. Germany; 3. Suriname

== Para Sjoelen ==
The first International Para Sjoelen Competition was played alongside the 2024 Sjoelen World Cup in Bischheim, France. Players from France, South Korea and Switzerland competed on electronic boards brought from South Korea for the event.

In South Korea, the Korean Disabled Sjoelen Association administers the sport for people with mental and physical disabilities. No adaptations are made to the game itself in Para Sjoelen, but in South Korea, special electronic boards are used that help with adjudication and scoring.

== See also ==
- Showdown (sport)
