= Foul line =

In sports and games, foul line can refer to

- basketball's free throw line
- one of baseball's two foul lines, also referred to as base lines
- table shuffleboard's foul line
- ten-pin bowling's foul line
  - the similar line in candlepin bowling
- the foul line for the long jump
