= Petits-Chevaux =

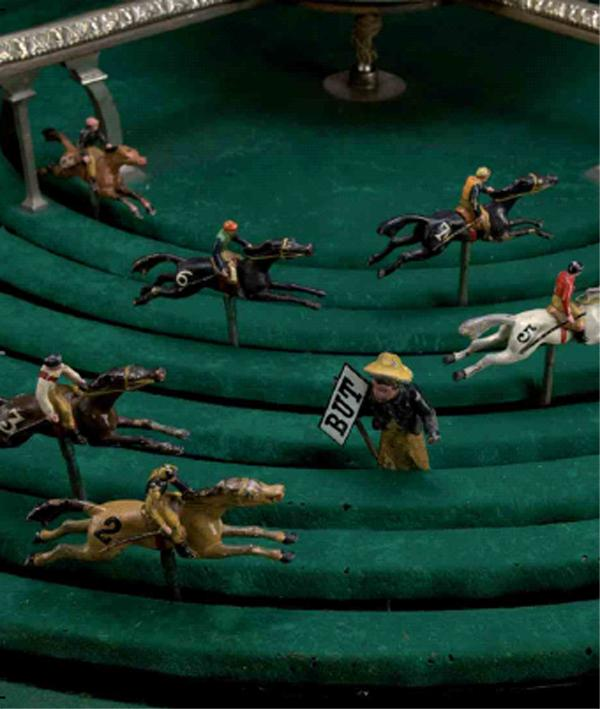
- Players: 2–4
- Setup time: 1–3 min.
- Playing time: 20–50 min.

Petits-Chevaux, French for "little horses", is a gambling game played with a mechanical device consisting of a board perforated with a number of concentric circular slits, in which revolve, each independently on its own axis, figures of jockeys on horseback, distinguished by numbers or colors. The bystanders having staked their money according to their choice on a board marked in divisions for this purpose, the horses are started revolving rapidly together by means of mechanism attached to the board, and the horse which stops nearest a marked goal wins, every player who has staked on that horse receiving so many times his stake. Figures of railway trains and other objects sometimes take the place of horses.

In recent years there has been a tendency to supplant the petits chevaux at French resorts by the boule game, on the same principle of gambling; not unlike in roulette, a ball is rolled on a basin-shaped table so that it may eventually settle in one of a number of shallow cups, each marked with a figure.

Petits-chevaux plays a prominent part in the Saki story "The Way to the Dairy" (c. 1911). It is also mentioned in the Thomas Mann novel The Magic Mountain.

== See also ==
- Sigma Derby
