= Table shuffleboard =

Game of pushing pucks down a wooden table

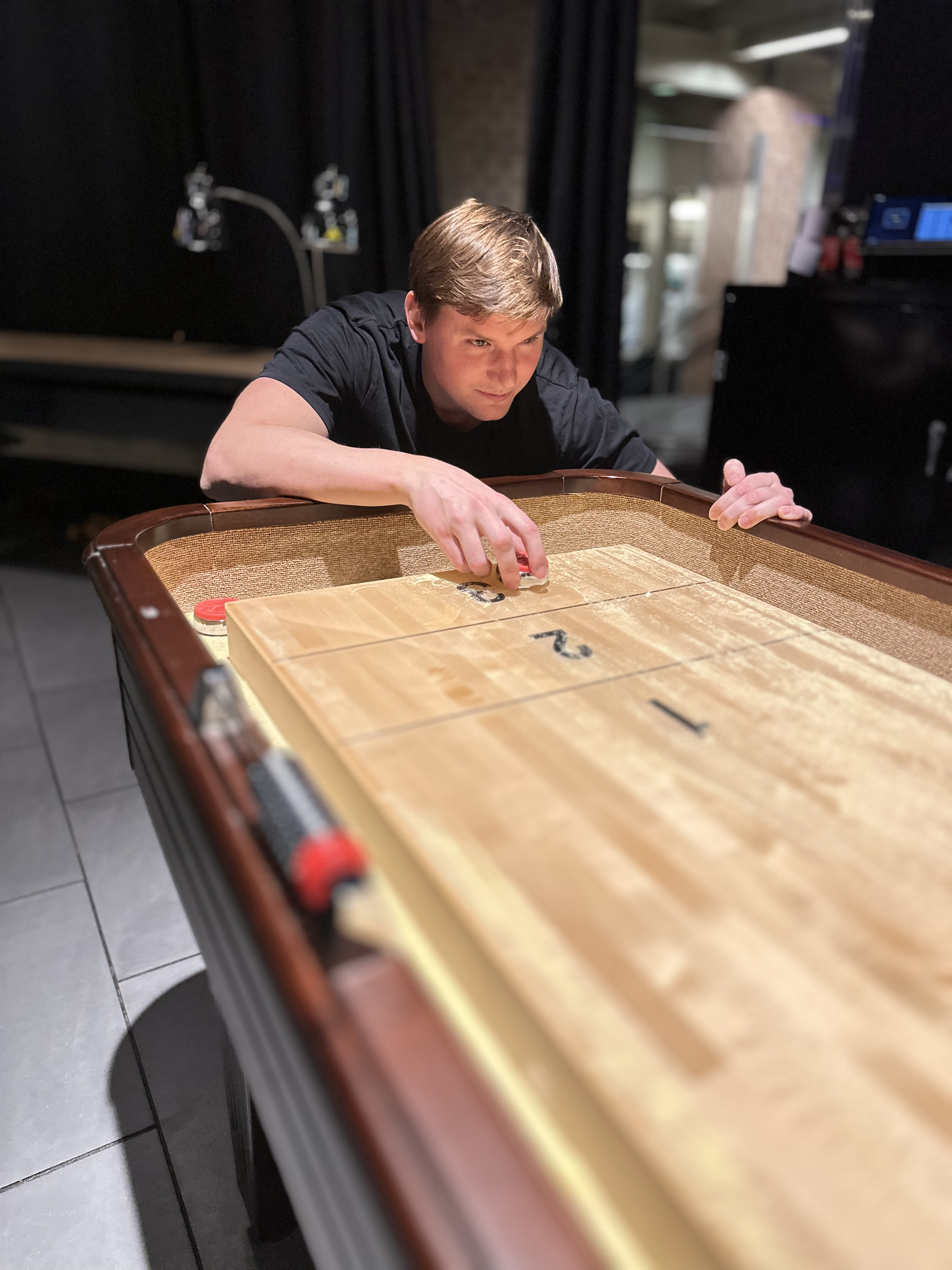
A shuffleboard player taking a shot

Table shuffleboard (also known as American shuffleboard, indoor shuffleboard, slingers, shufflepuck, quoits, and sandy table) is a game in which players push metal-and-plastic weighted pucks (also called weights or quoits) down a long and smooth wooden table into a scoring area at the opposite end of the table. Shooting is performed with the hand directly, as opposed to deck shuffleboard's use of cue sticks.

== Tables ==
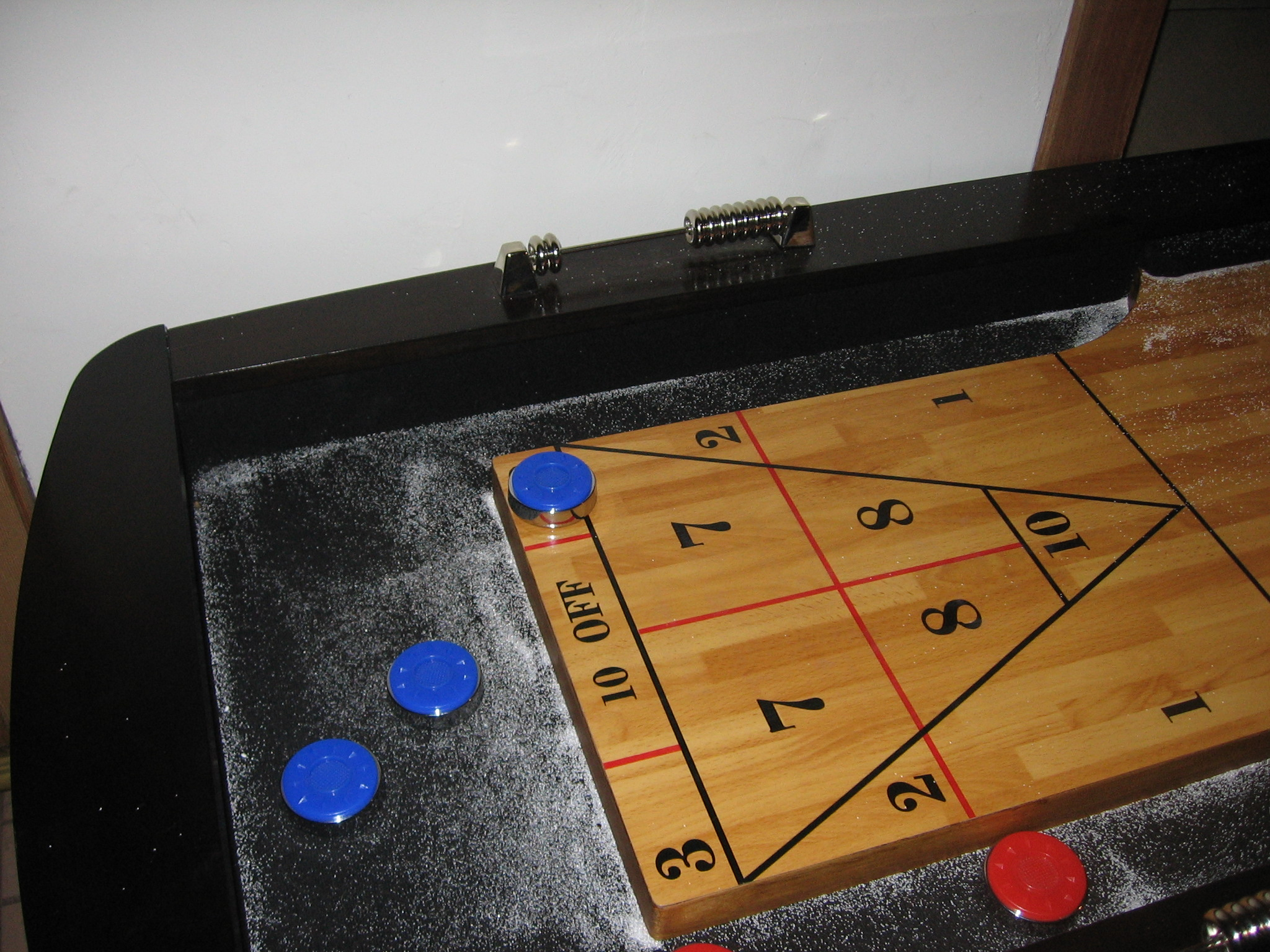
Table with American-style score markings

Shuffleboard tables vary in length, usually within a 9–22-foot range (2.7–6.7 m), and are at least 20 inches (510 mm) wide. Tables are intended to be kept flat, but any given table may have its own slight concave or convex condition, adding an extra challenge. In order to decrease friction, the table is occasionally sprinkled generously with tiny beads of silicone (often referred to as shuffleboard wax even though silicone is not a wax, or sometimes as shuffleboard sand, or shuffleboard cheese, due to its visual similarity to grated cheese). These beads act like ball bearings, letting a puck slide down the table a long distance with only a slight push. There are many different speeds of wax to choose from to match the player's skill level. Powdered wax is made of silicone, cornmeal and sometimes compressed walnut shells. The longer the table, the greater speed of wax that is needed. Faster speed waxes have more silicone and less cornmeal.

Each end of the table is divided into three scoring sections by straight lines across the width of the table. The scoring sections extend from the very edge of either end of the table towards the middle of the table, covering approximately one-third of the length of the table. The outer scoring section, at the end of the table, is labeled with the number "3" in the middle (for "3 points"). The next section is adjacent to this section, of equal length (6 inches), and is labeled with a "2". The final section, "1", is next to section "2". This section continues all the way to the foul line. The foul line measures 6 feet from the end of the table. The center third of the table is unmarked. The line that separates the center third of the table and the beginning of the "1 point" section is called the "foul line" (a weight which does not pass the foul line closest to the player is removed from the table for the round). The table is surrounded by a gutter, or "alley". Pucks that accidentally fall, or are knocked, into the gutter are out of play for the rest of the round.

== Gameplay ==
=== Scoring ===
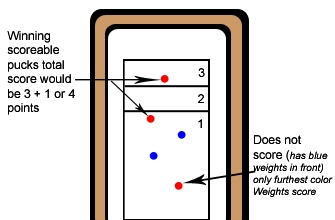
Table shuffleboard scoring

Players take turns sliding, or "shuffling", the weights to the opposite end of the board, trying to score points, bump opposing pucks off the board, or protect their own pucks from bump-offs. Points are scored by getting a weight to stop in one of the numbered scoring areas. A weight must completely cross the zone line to count as a full score (if a weight is partially in zone 2 and 3, the weight's score is 2). A weight that is hanging partially over the edge at the end of the table in the 3-point area, called a "hanger" (or sometimes a "shipper"), usually receives an extra point (count as 4). If a puck hangs off the end corner, it receives no additional scoring points other than being a 4 for hanging over the back edge of the board.

Weights that have not passed the foul line closest to the player are removed for the round. Pucks that fall off or are bumped into the gutter are removed from play for the round. No points are tabulated until the end of the round.

When all weights have been shuffled, the player with the puck closest to the far edge of the table takes points for every puck that is ahead of their opponent's furthest shot. The other player does not take points. For example: there is a red puck in 3, a red in 1, a blue in 1, but not as close to the end as the red, and two red pucks in 1, but further away from the end of the table than the blue puck. The red player would receive 4 points for the first two pucks ahead of the blue and no points for the pucks behind the blue; the blue player does not score. The player who scores will shoot first the next round.

In 1974, Reginald Charles Gilchrist invented the digital scoring unit for table shuffleboards while president of Universal Shuffleboards, one of the companies he founded.

=== Object of the game ===
The objective of the game is to slide, by hand, all four of one's weights alternately against those of an opponent, so that they reach the highest scoring area without falling off the end of the board into the alley. Furthermore, the player's weight(s) must be further down the board than their opponent's weight(s), in order to be in scoring position. This may be achieved either by knocking off the opponent's weight(s), or by outdistancing them. Horse collar, the most common form of the game, is played to either 15 or 21.

=== One-on-one ===
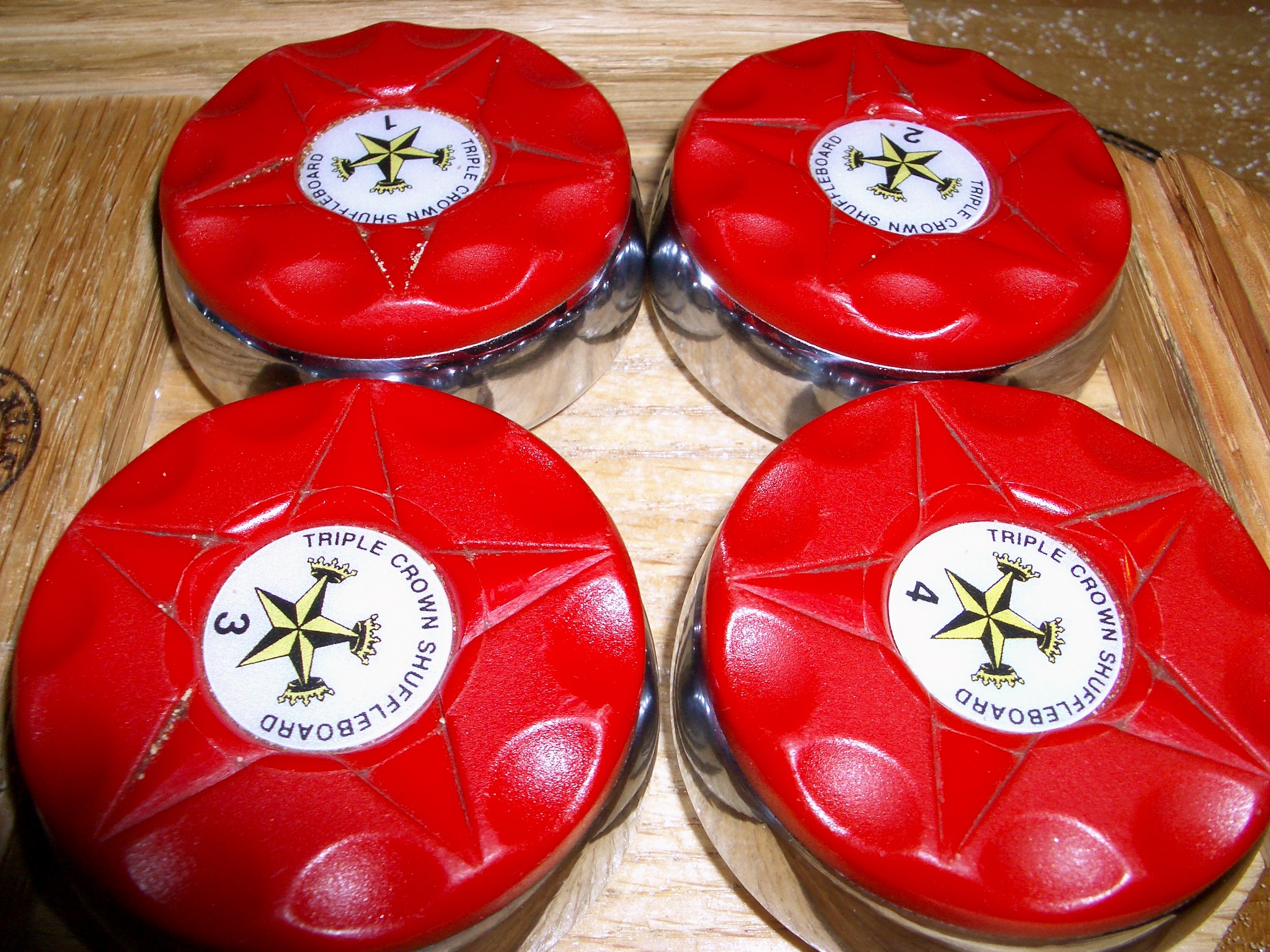
A set of pucks

In one-on-one, each player is assigned a color of puck (four pucks per player). Play begins at one end of the table, and each player alternates shuffling a single weight at a time down towards the opposite end of the table (which becomes the "scoring end"), until all eight pucks have been shuffled. Each player tries to either land their puck closest to the end of the table, knock the opponent's pucks off the table, knock their own puck into a higher scoring area, or position a puck so that it will block their opponent from being able to hit another puck off the table.

This finishes the "round". Play then continues from the other end of the table, where the pucks have come to rest. When a set number of points has been reached by a player (often 15 or 21), that player has won a "frame". A "match" consists of a predetermined number of frames.

=== Teams ===
In two-on-two, teammates stand on the opposite end of the table and play every other round, shooting from alternating ends of the table (i.e. two games are effectively played at once, with team scores combined). Players will sometimes switch to the other end of the table between frames.

An unofficial but common variation features all players at one end of the table. Each player will have two weights/shots per round. Teams alternate turns, with each teammate shooting every other turn.

=== Variations ===
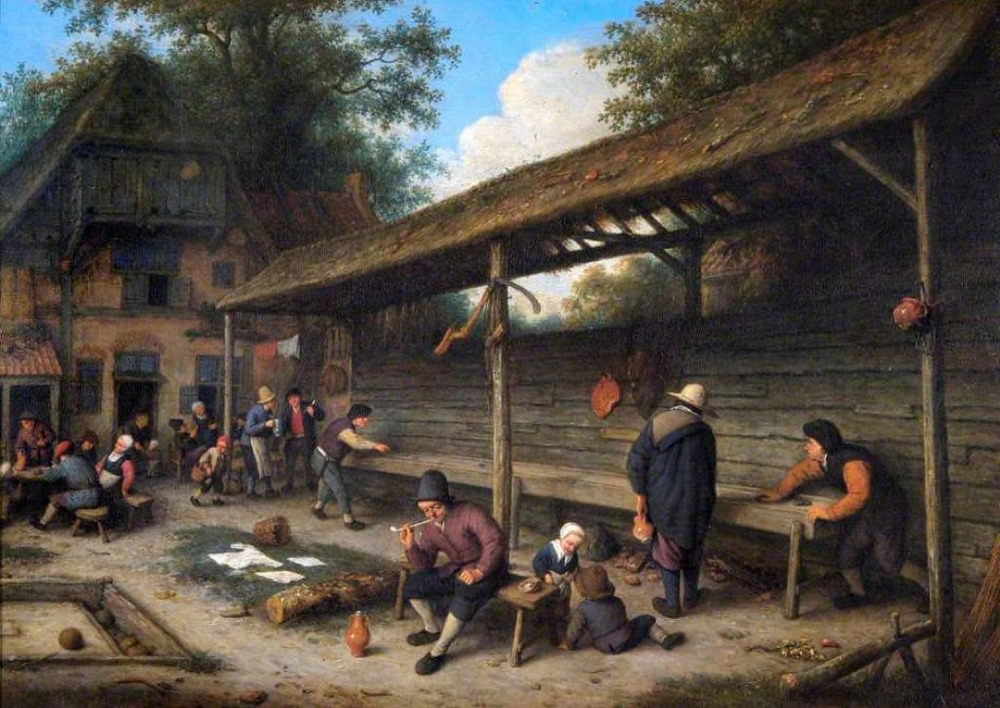
Shuffleboard at an inn, by Adriaen van Ostade (1677)

While there are some official rules agreed upon by shuffleboard organizations, players should be aware that it can be a very informal and spontaneous game, and as such, regional variations and house rules abound. There are also some differences by country.

In Canada, the game is played under rules approved by the Canadian Shuffleboard Congress. Except in certain tournaments, in one-on-one play, games are played to 15. Two-person teams compete until one team reaches 21 points. In both cases, a frame consists of four stones (pucks) per player.

In the U.S. League and Tournament Rules are established by The Shuffleboard Federation and the Table Shuffleboard Association. These rules can be very detailed and complex. The Shuffleboard Federation also has more basic rules that are geared towards beginners and casual recreational players. These fall under the heading of How To Play Shuffleboard. The Shuffleboard Federation website also provides rules and instructions for other games that can be played on a shuffleboard table, such as Horse Collar and Crazy Eights.

== Variants and related games ==
=== Sjoelen ===
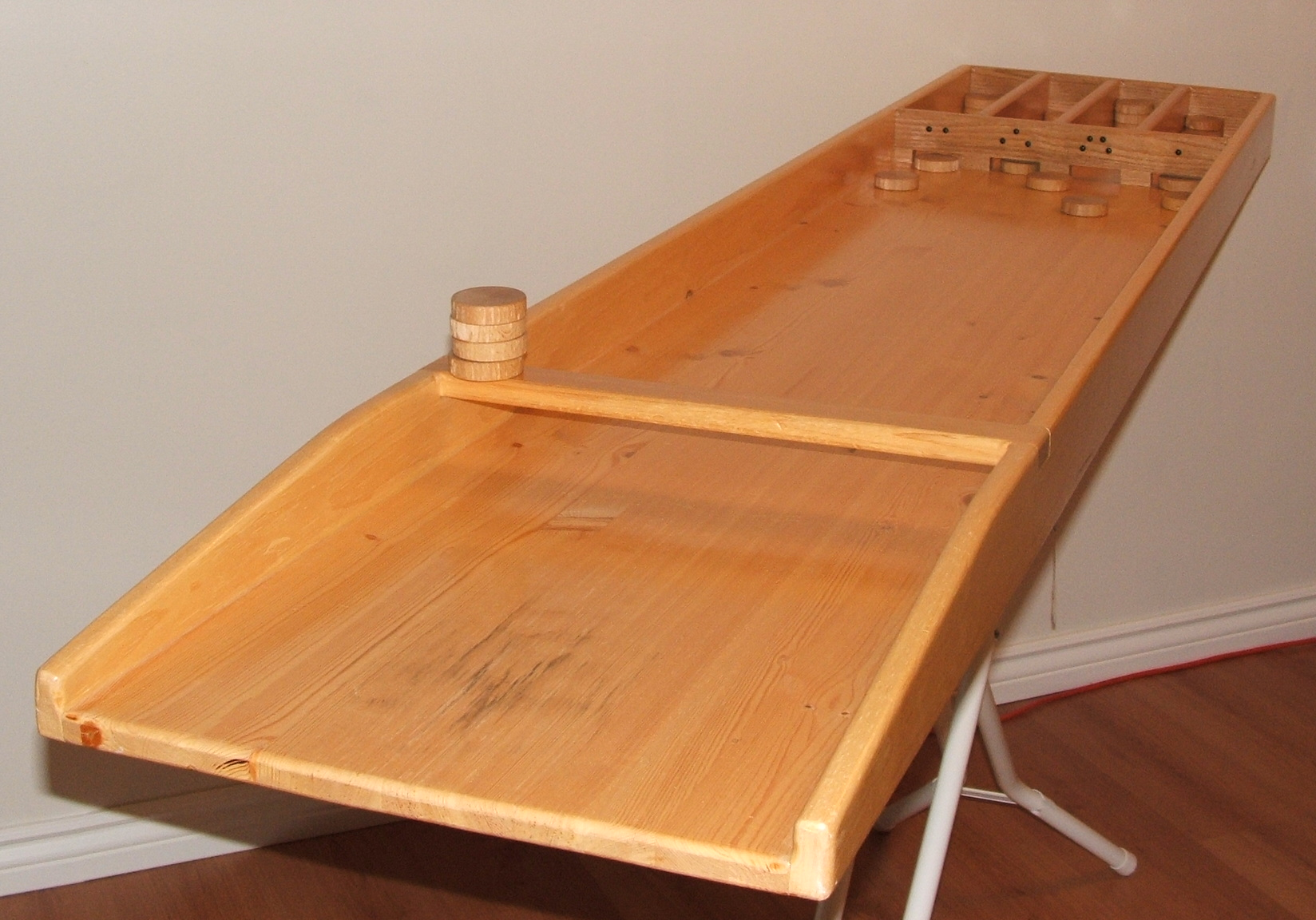
A sjoelen board is called a sjoelbak. It features four scoring boxes, the value of each denoted by the number of dots or tacks above the box's entrances.

A Dutch variation known as sjoelen, apparently influenced by bagatelle (a billiards offshoot and pinball ancestor), bar billiards, skeeball, miniature golf and related games, makes use of a long, unidirectional board placed on a table in which the goal is to slide 30 wooden pucks towards the end of the board and try to make them enter through small open doorways or arches into numbered scoring boxes. Each player has 3 sub-turns to get as many pucks as they can in the scoring boxes. The boxes are numbered from left to right: 2, 3, 4 and 1.

A notable rule is that for each set of pucks (a puck in every box) they count double so instead of 10 points for a set, the player will get 20 points for each set. The maximum score is 148 which is accomplished by getting 7 pucks in 2, 7 pucks in 3, 9 pucks in 4 and 7 pucks in 1. It totals to 7 × 20 + 4 + 4 = 148. However, if the player accomplishes the max score of 148 in less than 3 sub-turns, they are returned one puck for each sub-turn less, increasing the maximum possible score to either 152 (148 in 2 sub-turns) or 156 (148 in 1 sub-turn).

The most famous manufacturers of sjoelbakken (sjoelen boards) are Homas, Heemskerk Sport and Schilte, who mass-produce the game for the continental European market. A typical sjoelbak is two metres long and 40 cm wide, though there are variations between manufacturers and models.

A Sjoelen World Cup has taken place since 2008. The 2023 edition took place in Beneden-Leeuwen, Netherlands, on 1 and 2 September 2023 and was organized by the Algemene Nederlandse Sjoelbond (the Dutch governing body of the sport, which is affiliated with the NOC*NSF).

=== Shove ha'penny ===
An even more miniaturized, related British game, with a much less elongated board and many additional scoring zones, is played with coins and known as shove ha'penny. An evolutionary relationship between the game variants is uncertain.

=== Bonus Shuffle ===
In the 1979–1980 version of Beat the Clock which aired on CBS and was hosted by Monty Hall, the final round of the main game was called Bonus Shuffle, a game of table shuffleboard where the two teams attempted to throw disks to win cash from $300–$1,000. The team whose disk was the furthest won the game and the chance to play the Bonus Stunt for 10 times their Bonus Shuffle amount from $3,000–$10,000.

=== Tins of Glory World Tinnie Hurling Championships ===
Tins of Glory World Tinnie Hurling Championships is a version of the game made by Balter Brewing Company using beer cans on a table shuffleboard which started in 2017.

== See also ==
- Curling
- Shinty
