= Swiss Museum of Games =

Coordinates: 46°27′10″N 6°51′17″E

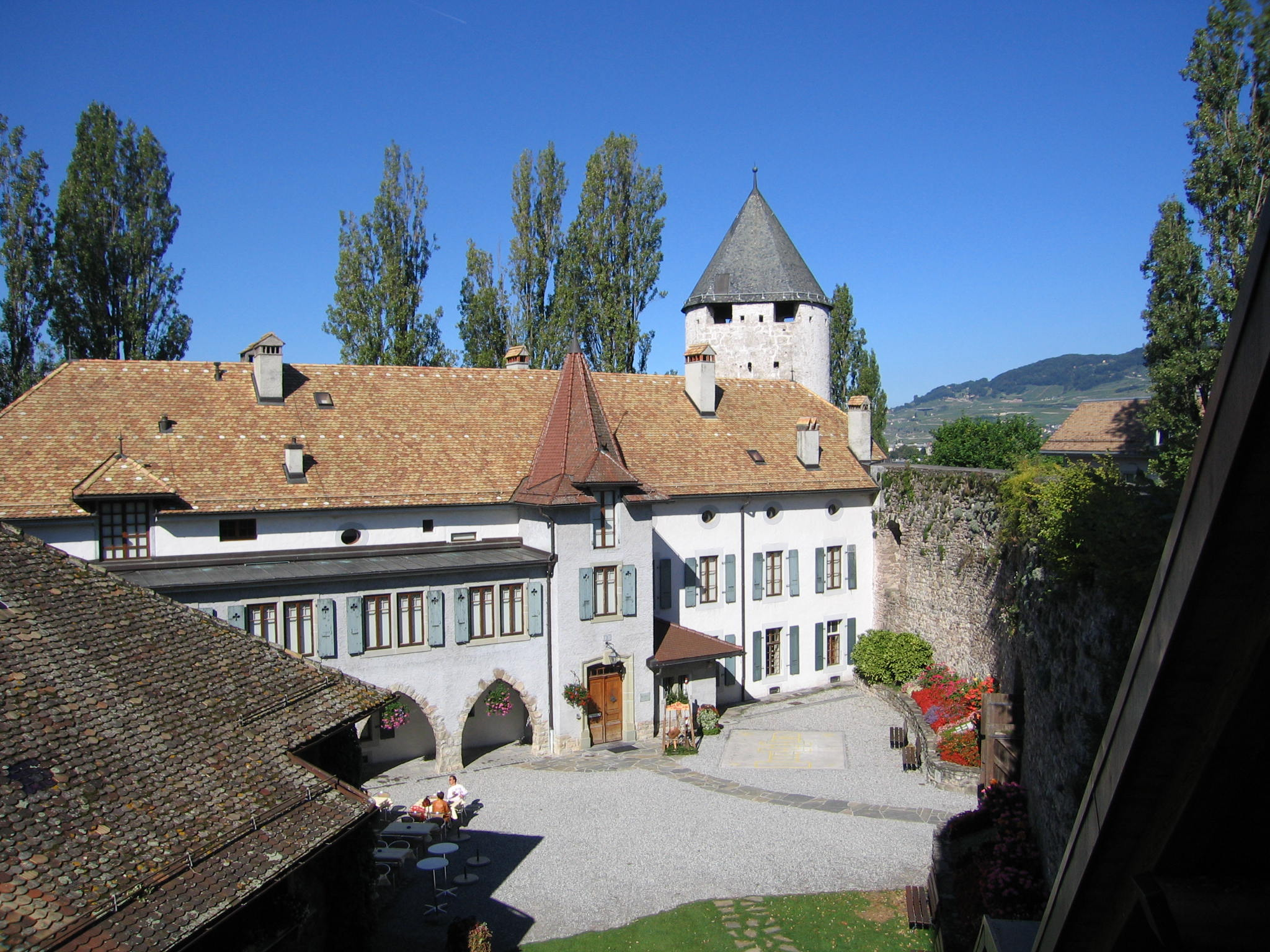
The games museum in the castle of La Tour-de-Peilz

Located on the shore of Lake Geneva between the cities of Vevey and Montreux, the Swiss Museum of Games in La Tour-de-Peilz is dedicated to the preservation, research and dissemination of various forms of parlor games. Unlike many other museums in the world, the Swiss Museum of Games distinguishes the "game" from "toys" (dolls, model making, etc.). It is the oldest of its kind and unique in Europe. The collection spans more than 10,000 games, from antiquity to the present and from all over the world.

== History of the museum ==
Following a plebiscite in 1979, the municipality of La Tour-de-Peilz acquired the castle located directly on the shores of Lake Geneva. The historic setting should then be made accessible to the public and provide a space for recreation and play. The ‘friends of the castle’ association was entrusted with the development and revitalization of the premises and a first exhibition titled "Table Games and Checkers" took place in November 1981.

Soon after, the city council commissioned Michel Etter, then a teacher at the École Supérieure in La Tour-de-Peilz, to design a museum concept and acquire a first collection of games.

In 1987, the museum was officially inaugurated and quickly made its place in the Swiss museum world. In fact, in Switzerland no one had ever thought about preserving these important memories, such as children's and adult games. In 1989, the museum received a special mention in the European Museums of the Year award.

From 2003 onwards, the museum and its collections were transferred to the Foundation created for this purpose. Shortly thereafter, the association of the friends of the museum replaced the association of the friends of the castle.

Since 2002, the museum has been managed by archaeologist and game expert Dr. Ulrich Schädler.

== Permanent exhibition ==
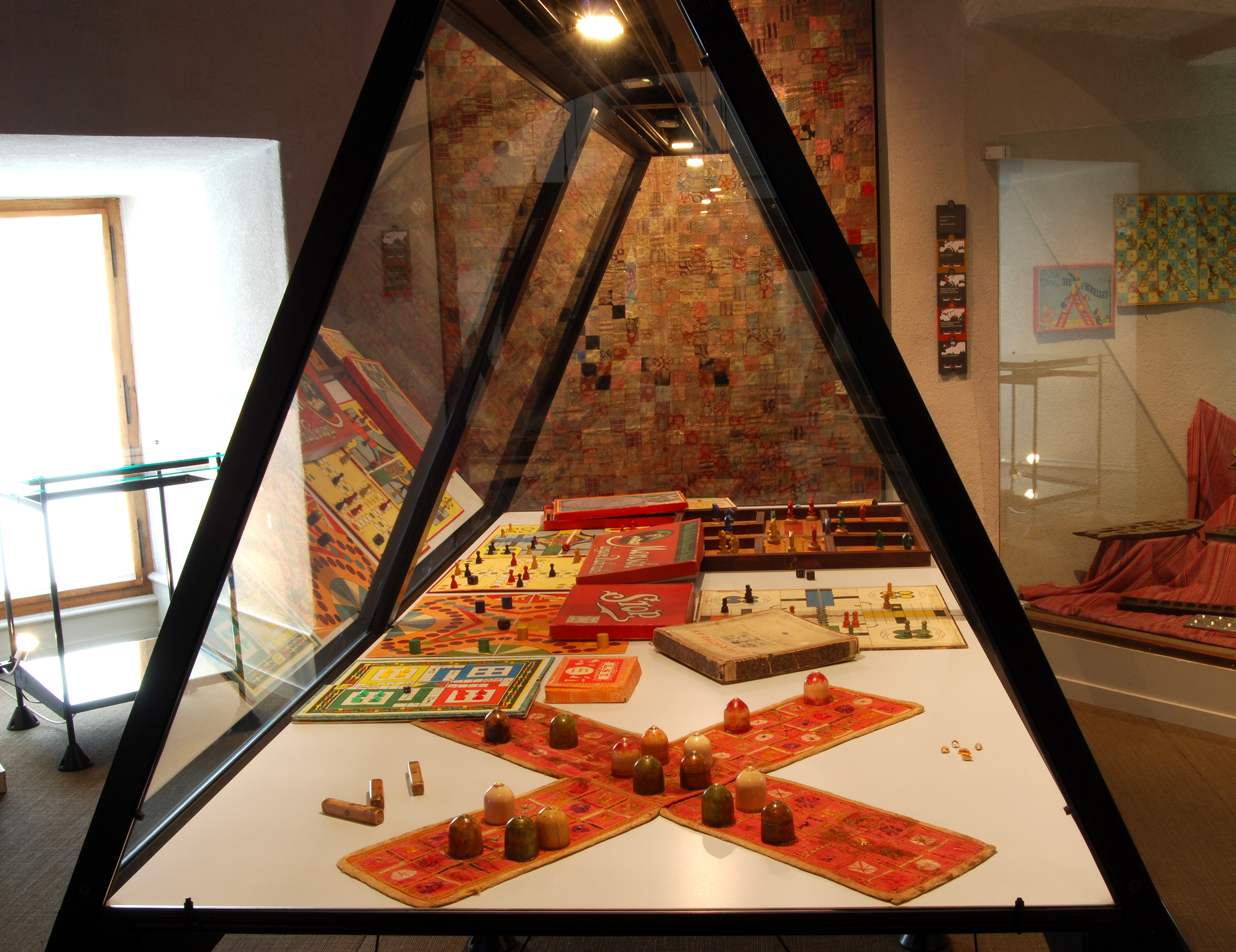
A showcase in the Swiss Games Museum in La Tour-de-Peilz

The permanent exhibition offers a panorama of the wide world of games from antiquity to the present and through various game typologies. The exhibition is divided into 10 parts:

- Voyajeux (games from Africa, Asia and South America)
- Back to the beginning (Ancient Games)
- European Games before the Industrialization
- Playing Cards - card games
- The body at stake (skill games)
- India – country of games
- The games market
- "Ye Olde Castle" - English Pub Games
- Win the jackpot! (Lotteries and lotteries)
- Outdoor games

Since 2007, the museum has a playful outdoor playground, which invites for a walk in the castle garden. The large family of outdoor games with or without equipment is also well represented in the museum.

A café and halls for rent complete the museum's offer.

== Temporary exhibitions ==
- 1988 « Rêves de pierre »
- 1989 « Jeux d’échecs : objet d’art »
- 1990 « La Suisse en jeu »
- 1990 « Jeu : tu, ils collectionnent… »
- 1991 « Jeux de boules et de billes : du hasard au calcul »
- 1992 « Chance, les jeux de hasard pur »
- 1993 « Loterie »
- 1995 « Hist(oie)res »
- 1998 « Le jeu d’échecs céramique »
- 1998 « Abattre pour jouer »
- 2000 « Construire, une passion »
- 2000 « L’Art de jouer »
- 2001 « B.D. un monde en jeux »
- 2001 « Billard : sport ou jeu ? »
- 2002 « Le corps en Jeu »
- 2004 « Kempelen – Echecs-o-mat »
- 2004/5 « Americanopoly »
- 2005/6 « Au fil du monde. Les jeux de ficelle »
- 2007 « Premio Archimede »
- 2008/9 « Le jeu discret de la Bourgeoisie. Deux siècles de culture ludique européenne »
- 2009 « Instant Chess », œuvres réalisées par les étudiants de la Haute École du Liechtenstein
- 2009/10 « Montagne et jeux. Entre cimes et neige à travers les jeux de société »
- 2010/11 « UKIYO-E. Estampes japonaises de Go de la collection Erwin Gerstorfer »
- 2011 « Premio Archimede »
- 2011/12 « Ecce Homo Ludens. Le jeu dans l'art contemporain »
- 2012 « Créateurs de chances. Les loteries en Europe »
- 2013 « La création de jeux, passion ou travail »
- 2014 « Le Tarot révélé. Jeu et divination »
- 2014 « Le jeu et l'Histoire se rencontrent. La Première Guerre Mondiale »
- 2015 « Veni, Vidi, Ludique ». Jouer avec l'Antiquité
- 2015/6 « Jeux du Château d'Hauteville. La vie ludique de Château autour de 1800 »
- 2015/16 « Le Mah-jong dans tous les sens »
- 2016 « La Vie Sauve » Présentation du plus grand puzzle du monde
- 2016 « Le collectionneur voyageur ». La collection d'échecs d'André Curchod
- 2016/17 « So British! »Les jeux anglais
- 2018/19 « Albert Smith. Le spectacle du Mont-Blanc »

== The castle ==
The Castle of Tour-de-Peilz was built in the Middle Ages and served as a defensive barrier by monitoring the maritime traffic on Lake Geneva and the customs. It was destroyed in 1476 during the Burgundy Wars and acquired and rebuilt in 1747 by Jean Grésier, a French officer. At the beginning of the 20th century, an arcaded gallery and a main entrance tower were built. The two corner towers, the enclosure, the city walls and the trenches were classified as historical monuments in 1973.

== The Library ==
The special library contains around 5,000 books. The book and correspondence collection of Ken Whyld, an English historian of the chess game who died in 2003, is one of them. Interested persons can visit the library upon request.

== Museum activities ==
In addition to the permanent exhibition and the temporary exhibitions, the museum offers educational workshops for children, adults and businesses. A pedagogic contents file is available to teachers. Regular events are also held, such as the international Awele tournament or the annual meeting of Swiss game developers. It should also be noted that the winners of the prototype of the competition "Premio Archimede" are shown in the museum.

Since 2009, in September, the Château du Jeu, a major event organized on a Sunday, brings together game publishers, gaming associations, game operators and a large audience. The event takes place every year.

== Association of Friends of the Museum ==
Founded in 2003, the Association Friends of the Swiss Museum of Games seeks to promote the development of the museum, enrich its collections and strengthen links with the public.

The aim is, inter alia, to bring together people interested in the game as a universal cultural asset, to promote the reputation of the museum, to fund research, to promote or publish studies and special works, to enrich the collection, to encourage the participation of volunteers in the Museum, to improve museum services and organize conferences.

== Publications ==
« La Suisse en jeu » Roger Kaysel et al. 1989, (ISBN 3-85545-037-4)

« Jeux d’échecs : objets d’art » Michel Etter, 1989, (ISBN 288375005X)

« Jeu : tu, ils collectionnent » Michel Etter, 1990, (OCLC 756977640)

« Jeux de billes et de boules » Philippe Addor, 1991, (ISBN 2-88375-007-6)

« Chance : les jeux de hasard pur » Philippe Addor et al. 1992

« HistOIEres » Marimée Montalbetti, 1995, (ISBN 2-88375-008-4)

« L’art de jouer » Bernard Giry et al. 2000, (ISBN 2-9514573-2-4)

« Americanopoly » Bruce Whitehill, 2004, (ISBN 2-88375-009-2)

« Kempelen. Echecs-o-mat - Schachautomat » Ernst Strouhal et Brigitte Felderer, 2004

« Jeux de l’humanité, 5000 ans d’histoire culturelle des jeux de société » Ulrich Schädler (ed.), 2007, (ISBN 978-2-8321-0298-5)

« Spiele der Menschheit, 5000 Jahre Kulturgeschichte der Gesellschaftsspiele » Ulrich Schädler (ed.), 2007, (ISBN 978-3-89678-615-9)

« Créateurs de Chances. Les loteries en Europe » Ulrich Schädler (éd.) 2012, (ISBN 978-2-88375-025-8)

« Le Tarot révélé » Thierry Depaulis, 2013, (ISBN 978-2-88375-013-5)

« Mah jong, le jeu » Jennifer Genovese (éd.), 2015, (ISBN 978-2809711240)

== See also ==
- List of museums in Switzerland
