= Le multicolore =

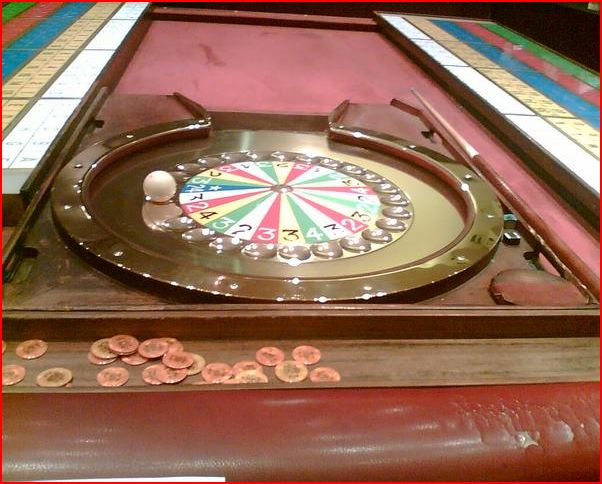
A table for Le Multicolore

Le multicolore is a game of chance from France and Catalonia that features characteristics of both roulette and bagatelle. In the game, a ball is rolled into a basin-shaped wheel, which is divided into twenty-five shallow cups. Each cup is assigned one of five colours, with a value ascribed. The game consists in predicting on which colour the ball will rest.

The game is played at several cercles de jeu in France, where conventional roulette is not allowed.

== Description and rules ==
The game is composed of a large gaming table provided with a circular disc on one of its extremes. This wheel has twenty-five identical cups of five different colours: six red, six green, six yellow, six white and one blue. Of the six cups of identical colour one is numbered 4, three 3 and the last two 2, while the blue cup is numbered 24. The wheel may spin, or be static.

Surrounding the table there is a layout divided and painted with these five colours, where the players can place their wagers.

To determine the winning colour, a croupier strikes, with a cue stick, an ivory ball into a rail, then the ball runs along the cloth, goes up a ramp and enters the circumference of the wheel. The ball eventually falls into one of 25 cups on the wheel.

The odds paid on the winning colour are 2, 3, 4 or 24 to 1, depending on the cup where the ball has fallen.

== Sources ==
- Le multicolore, roulette du peuple (Archived)
