= Parchís =

Spanish cross and circle board game

Parchís board

Parchís is a Spanish board game of the original from the Cross and Circle family. It is an adaptation of the Indian game Pachisi. Parchís was a very popular game in Spain at one point as well as in Europe and north Morocco - specifically Tangiers and Tetouan, and it is still popular especially among adults and seniors. Since it uses dice, Parchís is not usually regarded as an abstract strategy game like checkers or chess. It does not depend entirely on luck either, since the four pawns under a player's command demand some sort of strategy.

Parchís is license-free in Spain, so in stores it is just as easy to find as a deck of cards, and is usually cheaper. Although the original game allows up to four players and has 68 spaces (that is, the board counts four colors: yellow, blue, red and green), six-player versions with 102 spaces are not hard to find (adding orange and purple, in that order), and eight-player boards with 136 spaces can be found in big toy stores.

Traditionally, each player has a cubilete (dice cup) to shake and toss the dice. This does not affect the course of the game itself, but most habitual players find it imperative.

On the reverse of the board it is usual to find a board for the Game of the Goose.

The game can now be played on mobile. Certain apps offer real time multiplayer gameplay where you can play with real opponents across the world.

== Rules ==
This game is played with one six-sided die and four pawns per player. Dice cups are optional, but most game sets include them. The players compete on leading their four pawns out of their nest, around the whole board, into the color track and up to the center of the board, chasing and "eating" each other in the process.

A roll of five forces the player to release one pawn from the nest (if there are any left), and a roll of six gives the player an extra turn. When the player has four pawns in the game (outside the nest), whenever they get a six, they can move 7 squares. The rule gets cancelled if a pawn reaches the end and gets out of the board.

If ever three 6s are rolled in a row, the last piece moved is killed and returned to the nest. If the last piece moved was in the final colored ramp, it is only moved to the bottom of it. And if the final move is in a secured square it remains there, and the turn is cancelled and passed to the next player.

When a pawn "eats" an opponent's pawn (by landing on the same square, if it is not a safe square), it "kills" it, sending it back to the nest, and advances 20 squares. If a player doesn't notice a kill and moves another pawn, that pawn gets back to the nest. When a pawn reaches the end, one of the other pawns of the same color can advance ten squares.

When one or two pawns of any other color are in the starting square and the player rolls a five, it eats the opposing pawn or pawns, in case it kills two opposing pawns, player can advance with 40 squares.

Blockades can also be made with two pawns. In some variants, a blockade can be formed in any square, if both pawns belong to the same player—otherwise the last to arrive would kill the first. Pawns cannot jump over blockades, which causes "jams", making it easy for players to "eat" each other. A player must open a blockade if they toss a six with the dice.
