= Sigma Derby =

Electro Mechanic Horse Race

Sigma Derby Instructions

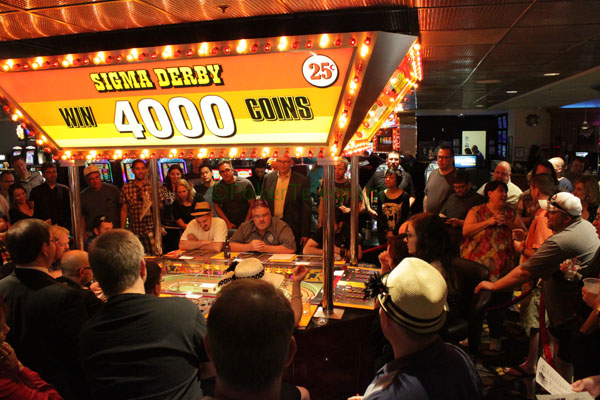
2013 Sigma Derby Tournament

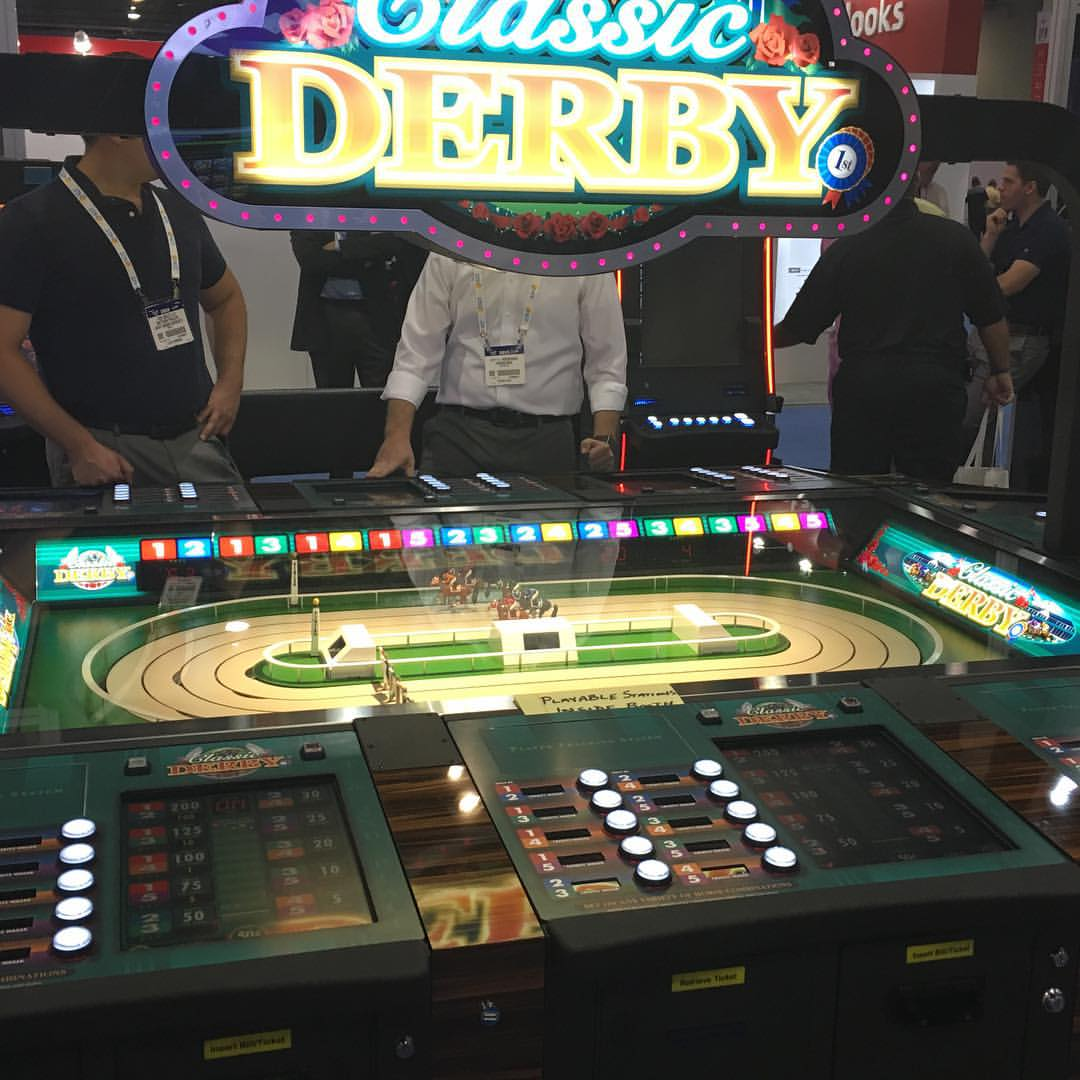
VSR Industries' prototype of a Sigma Derby-like game on floor of G2E Conference in Las Vegas, NV 2015-9-29

Sigma Derby is an electro-mechanical horse race used for gambling manufactured by Japanese manufacturer Sigma Game Inc. and introduced in 1985. Up to ten players can buy in with quarters and place bets on the five horses; a quinella of two horses in any order pays out according to the odds. The house has roughly a 10-20% advantage, depending on the machine.

The closing of the New Frontier Hotel and Casino, left one remaining Sigma Derby machine in Las Vegas, located at The D Las Vegas in Downtown Las Vegas. The Sigma Derby's last race at The D was on June 14, 2026. It was relocated amid fanfare, in a ceremonial procession along Fremont Street, with entertainers and guests, to the Golden Gate Hotel and Casino, a sister property to The D, on June 16.

Atlantic City is home of one Sigma Derby type machine in the Tropicana hotel and casino, known as Royal Derby.

Two new versions of a racing game similar to Sigma Derby made their debut at the G2E Conference in Las Vegas, NV in 2015. One was a prototype game called "Classic Derby," made by manufacturing company VSR Industries. Another was a game called Royal Derby, made by Slovenian gaming company Alfastreet.

Field trials of additional Sigma Derby games are planned for Las Vegas by Next Gaming, in partnership with Highbrow Gaming LLC and VSR Industries, in 2026, following a re-launch of the game at Pechanga Resort Casino in Southern California. The Vegas trial is expected to take place at either Four Queens or Binion’s, both of which are owned by Next Gaming founder Terry Caudill.
