= Shuffleboard =

Game

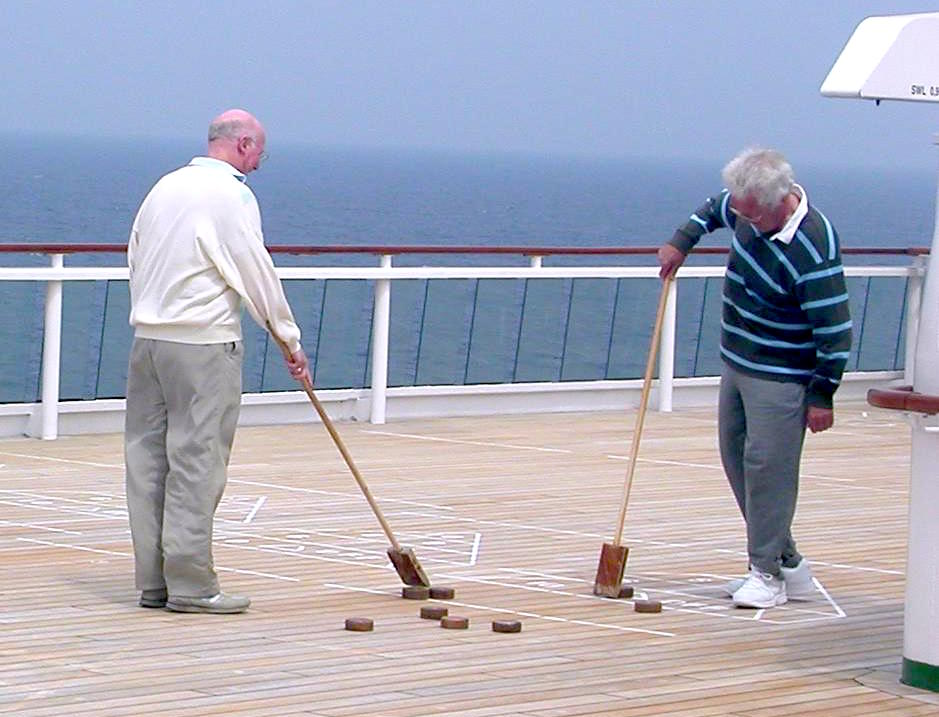
Two shuffleboard players preparing a game on the deck of P&O Cruises' Aurora with cue-sticks

Shuffleboard (deck shuffleboard) is a game in which players use cues to push weighted discs, sending them gliding down a narrow court, with the purpose of having them come to rest within a marked scoring area. As a more generic term, it refers to the family of shuffleboard-variant games as a whole.

== History ==
The earliest references to shuffleboard (as table shuffleboard) appear in Tudor England. Henry VIII played "shovillabourde" for stakes, and custom "shovelboard" tables were kept in wealthy English households until the 17th century. Examples of such tables survive at Stanway House and Tredegar House. The rising popularity of billiards in that century displaced shovelboard from high society, but variations of it continued in public houses. One of these called shove-groat was played during Henry's reign and was widespread enough to be banned by name in the Unlawful Games Act 1541. A similar game called shove ha'penny is still played today.

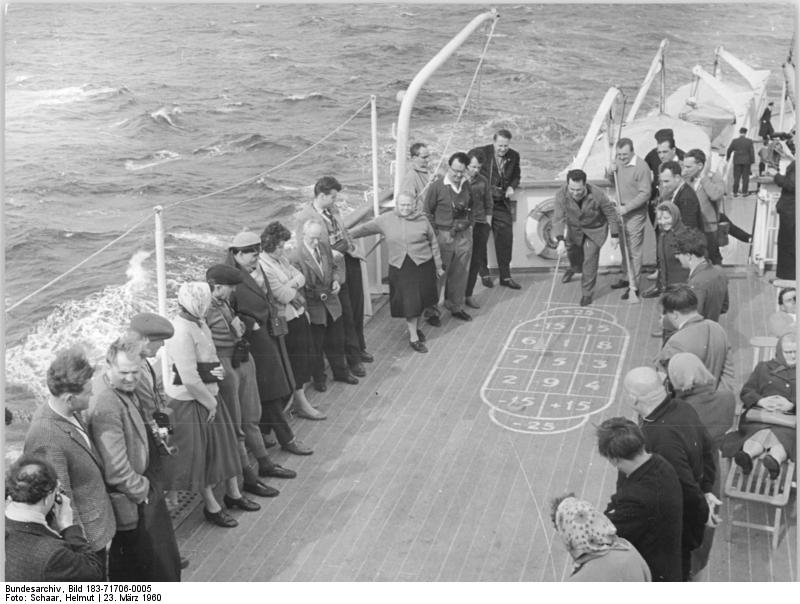
Deck shuffleboard with oval scoring target

Travel literature and other sources describe ship passengers improvising shuffleboard games on deck (also called deck billiards or deck skittles) as early as the 1830s to pass time at sea. One account describes shuffleboard as "a kind of deck bagatelle," a then-popular billiards game with numbered scoring targets. Robert Ball is credited with bringing this "deck shuffleboard" ashore in 1913 when he added a court in front of his Lyndhurst Hotel in Daytona Beach, Florida. The game spread through Daytona Beach and around the state, prompting the establishment of clubs and regulations. The St. Petersburg Shuffleboard Club began in 1924 with two courts and, driven by the game's surging popularity, expanded to 116 courts by 1939.

Efforts to develop the game as a professional sport had limited success, and by the 1960s club participation had dropped significantly. The St. Petersburg Club was down to 35 members in the early 2000s before it rebounded with an influx of younger players. The game continues throughout the United States as an amateur pastime, attractive to older players due to its combination of low physical demands and strategic complexity. The Florida version of the game is also played on cruise ships and has been adapted back into table form.

== Gameplay ==
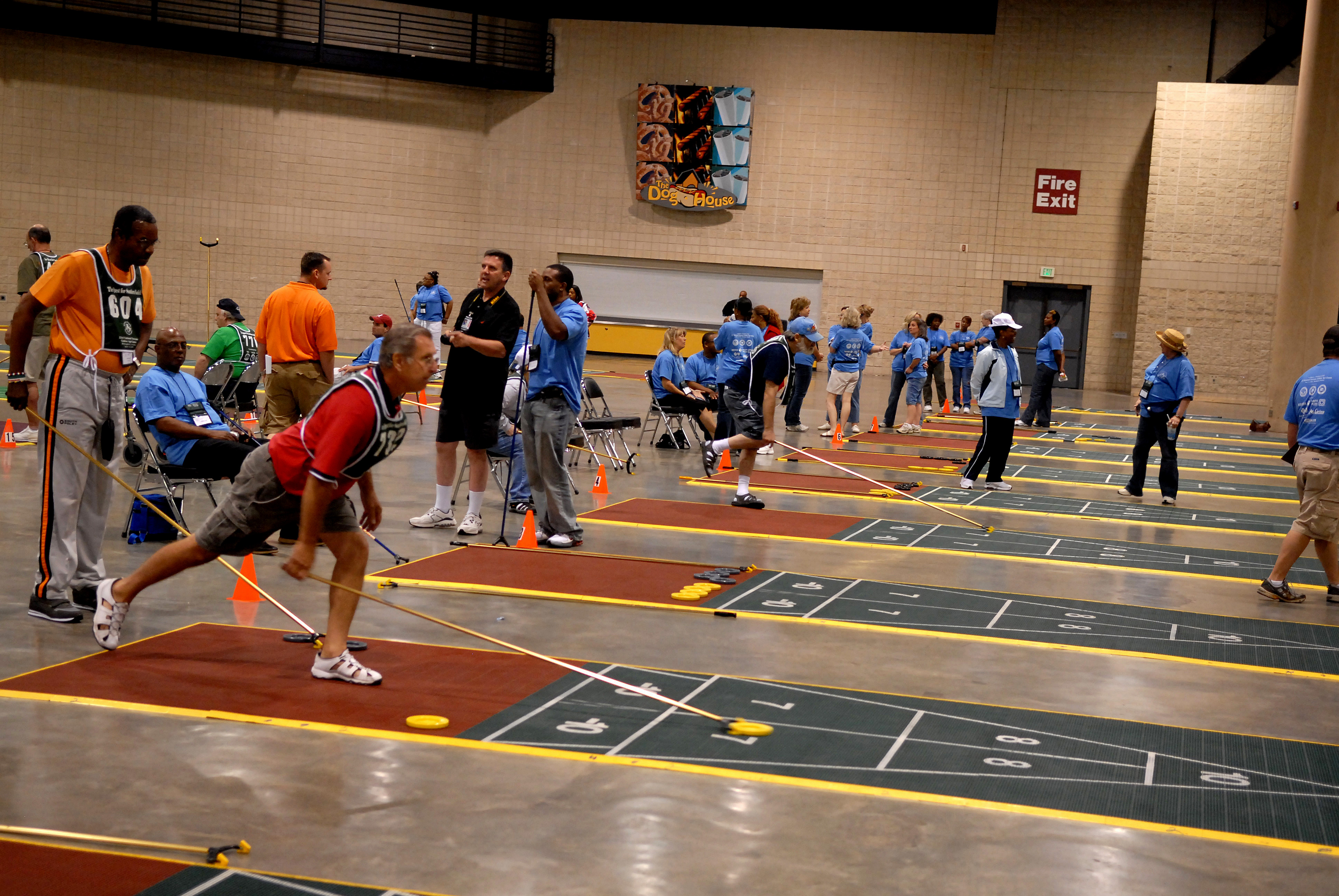
Indoor shuffleboard on mats

Players use a cue (cue-stick), to push their colored discs, down a court (a flat floor of concrete, wood or other hard material, marked with lines denoting scoring zones), attempting to place their discs within a marked scoring area at the far end of the court. The discs themselves are of two contrasting colors (usually yellow and black), each color belonging to a player or team. The scoring diagram is divided by lines, into six scoring zones, with the following values: 10, 8, 8, 7, 7, 10-off (minus ten).

After eight discs (four per team, taking alternating shots) have been played from one end of the court (a frame), the final score values of discs for each player (or team) in the scoring zones is assessed: If a disc is completely within a scoring zone without touching (overlapping) any part of the border-line of the zone, it is good and that zone value is added to the correct player's score for the frame, and then to the player's total points. Both players' good discs are added to their respective scores. Players (or teams of two players, one at each end) take turns going first during a game, so that the advantageous last shot of a frame (the hammer) also alternates between players.

The winner of the game may be the first to reach any total decided upon, or may be the higher score after playing a certain number of frames (e.g. 8, 12 or 16). There is also the 'first to 75-points' game. Ties are broken by playing extra frames (two for singles, four for doubles).

=== Court description ===
Dimensions of a floor shuffleboard court can vary to suit available space, but an official shuffleboard court is 6 feet (1.8 m) wide by 39 feet (12 m) in length plus a 6-foot (1.8 m) shooting area at each end. Typically a scoring zone is painted at each end of the court to reduce set-up time between games. Each scoring zone comprises an isosceles triangle 6 feet × 9 feet with the short edge away from the shooter. Behind the scoring zone is the 10-off zone, an area 1½ feet deep. The court surface is usually a uniform dark green; lines are 1 inch wide except for the mid-shooting area. 1-inch (25 mm) white lines form the scoring triangle and further divide the triangle into the separate scoring zones. (Line width is not considered in court dimensions given here.)

Top view of a shuffleboard

The court is the same from each end, including:

- A 6-foot (1.8 m) Player Shooting Area. The shooting area begins behind the back line of the 10-off trapezoid. This line is called the Baseline. The shooter may not step on or beyond the Baseline.
- A "10-off" area or "kitchen" measuring 1.5 feet (0.46 m). The sides of the 10-off area are defined by two lines running at the same angle as the Scoring Triangle.
- The Back-7 Line crosses the entire court.
- A center-line runs from the middle of the Back-7-line up the middle of the court for 6 feet (1.8 m). The two 7 score zones are located on each side of the Center-Line, for a length of 3 feet, bounded at the top by the Back-8 line, running side to side across and within the scoring triangle;
- The two 8 scoring zones are located one each side of the center-line for a length of 3 feet (0.91 m), bounded at the top by the Top-8 line running side to side across and within the scoring triangle, and forming a T with the end of the center-line.
- The 10 scoring zone is at the peak of the overall scoring triangle, and is 3 feet in height, from the Top-8 line to the peak of the triangle. A further dead-line or lag-line runs from side to side 12 feet from the base-line. The dead-line is therefore 3 feet from the tip of the triangle.
- There are two dead-lines, 12 feet apart. Any shot disc that does not cross or touch the furthest dead-line is then simply removed from the court (a wasted shot).

=== Equipment ===
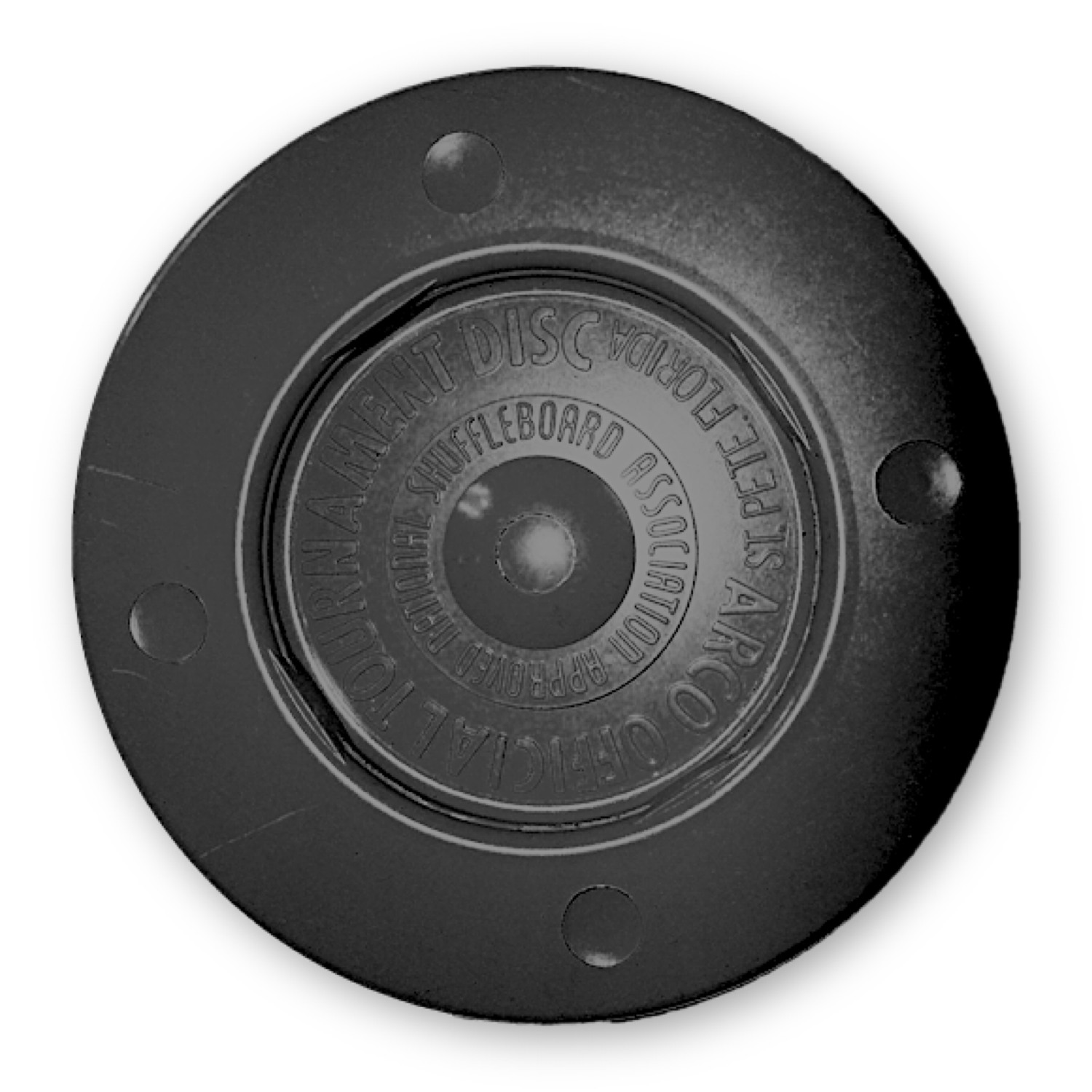
Black shuffleboard disc

Modern floor shuffleboard is played with eight round, hard, durable 6-inch (150 mm) diameter plastic discs. New discs are about 1 inch (25 mm) in thickness, weighing 15 ounces (430 g). In a set of discs, there are four discs of a light color and four of a dark color. One color is used by one team. The most common colors are yellow and black, but others are occasionally used. The cue length is 6 feet 3 inches (1.91 m) or less, with hard plastic feet on the end (as metal would damage the court surface). "Disc" and "cue" are the terms adopted in Florida-style regulations, although the alternate terms "biscuit" and "tang" are sometimes used.

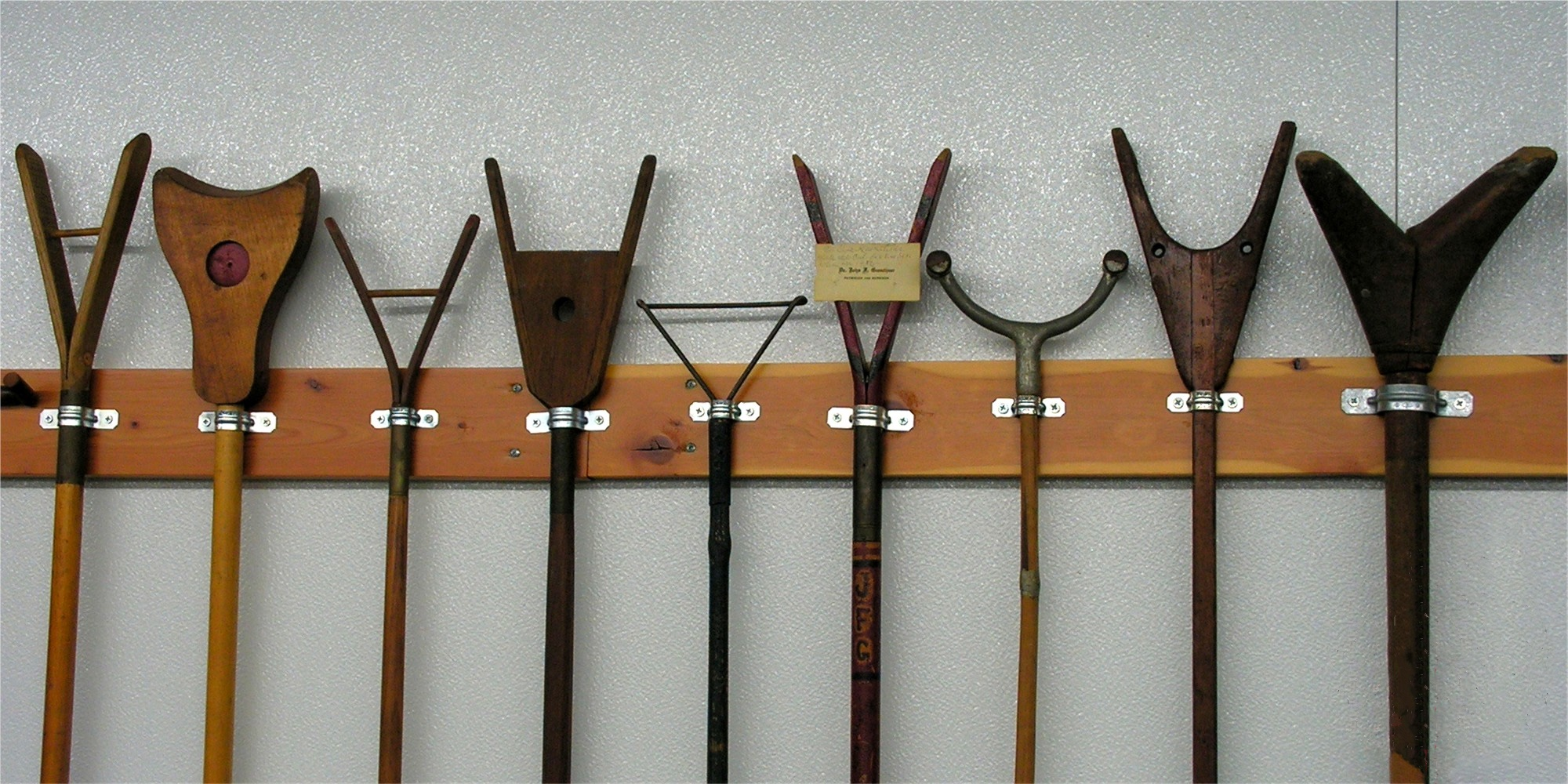
A variety of shuffleboard cues

There are two basic types of scoreboard:

- Resort type uses two sliders that can move up and down a numbered scale, like a thermometer, with values running from zero at the bottom to 75 at the top. Each team uses their own slider to record their total score. The resort-type scoreboard is simple and durable, but provides no way to detect scoring errors from one frame to the next.
- Blackboard (or whiteboard) type is ruled with four or eight horizontal lines and each team's total score is written after each frame, yellow on the left and black on the right. When all the lines have been filled with scores the top lines are erased and scores are again written from the top. The advantage of the blackboard type is that mistakes in adding and recording the score are easier to spot, because previous scores should always be seen. As well, it is easy to keep track of frames played using small numbers written down the scoreboard. In the western United States and western Canada, blackboard-type scoreboards run from side-to-side, but the principle is the same.

Courts are available for use on residential decks or on any solid flat surface, in the form of roll-out plastic mats, or adjustable arrays of plastic tiles. With the tile courts, the dimensions can be adapted to the space available; e.g. it is possible to play on a court 30 ft long (9.1 m) by 5 ft wide (1.5 m). The roll-out mats are available in two sizes, 39 by 6 feet (11.9 m × 1.8 m) and 27 by 4.5 feet (8.2 m × 1.4 m). The smaller mats are designed to fit on a domestic patio or driveway. The discs and cues are the same standard size, regardless which court size is used.

=== Strategy ===
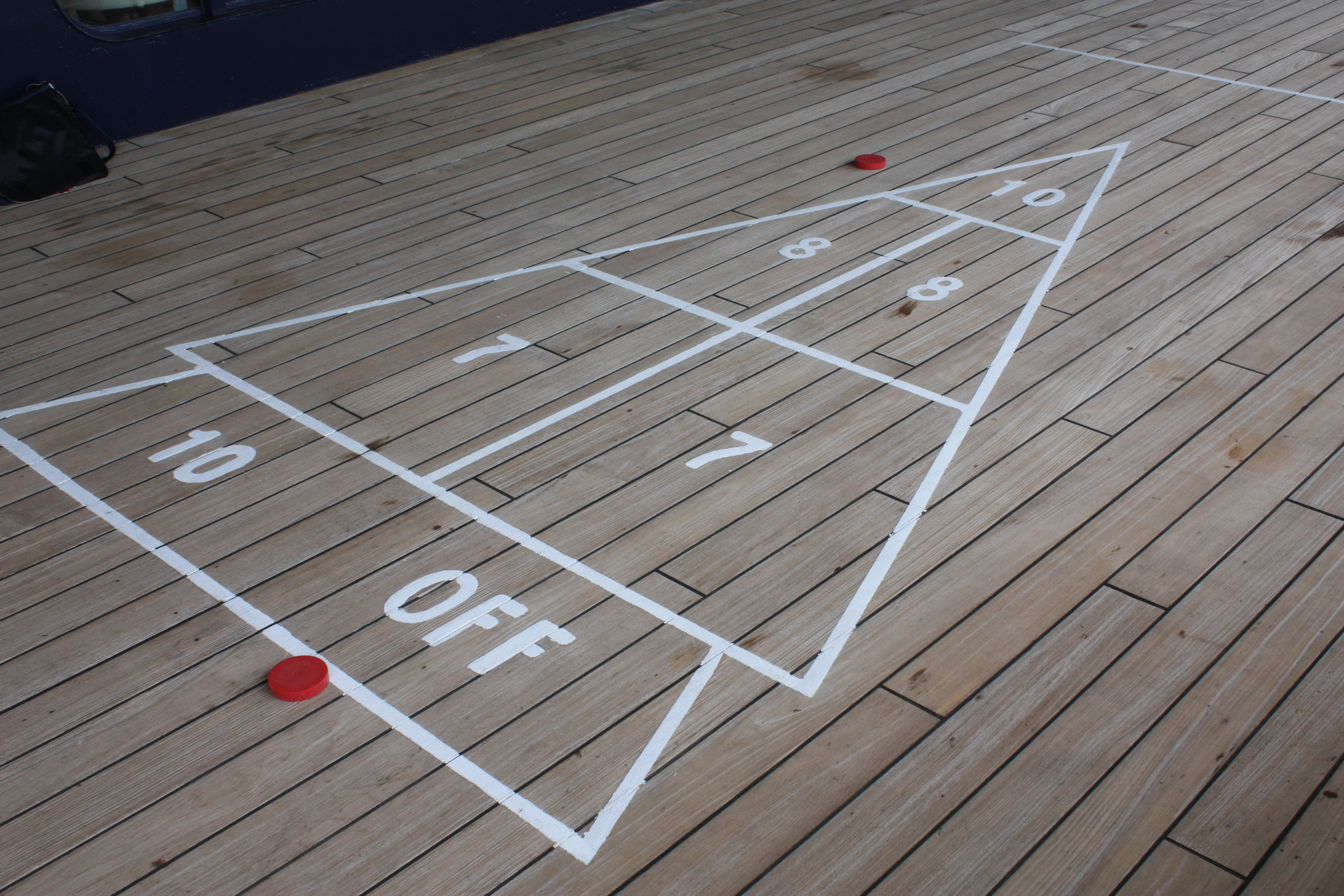
Discs on a scoring triangle

Discs are scored according to their final position at the end of the frame, rather than where they were originally shot, and striking any previously shot disc is permitted. These rules bring a significant strategic aspect to the gameplay. An unobstructed disc in the scoring area can be knocked out of the court or into the 10-off area by an opposing player. It is common to block the scoring area by shooting discs into the zone between the dead line and scoring triangle. A blocking disc on the opponent's side obstructs them from scoring with a straight shot, while a blocking disc on one's own side secures that side for straight shots. The last shot of a frame, called the "hammer," is a critical opportunity to change the score in one's favor.

== International Shuffleboard Association ==
The ISA was founded March 10, 1979, in St. Petersburg, Florida. The ISA was designed to make shuffleboard more popular in countries outside the North American continent, and to foster shuffleboard through international competitions. In 1981 in Muskegon, Michigan, the first ISA Team World Championships were held, starting with teams from Canada, the US and Japan only. Australia (1991), Brazil (1997), Germany (2006), Norway (2011) Russia (2013) and lately the Netherlands (2023) joined the World Championships, which take place yearly and last for one week.

== Table shuffleboard variants ==
In table shuffleboard, the play area is most commonly a wooden or laminated surface covered with silicone beads (colloquially called 'shuffleboard wax') to reduce friction. In the United States, a long, narrow 22 ft table is most commonly used, though tables as short as 9 ft are known.

Players try to slide metal-and-plastic pucks, sometimes called weights or shuckles, to come to rest within zones at the other end of the board. Cues are not used, the pucks being propelled with the hands directly on the raised table. There are scoring zones at each end of the table so that direction of play can rotate after each frame, or so that teams can play both directions during one frame. More points are awarded for weights scoring closer to the far edge of the board. Players take turns sliding the pucks, trying to score points, bump opposing pucks off the board, and/or protect their own pucks from bump-offs. The long sides of the table are bounded by gutters into which pucks can fall or be knocked (in which case they are no longer in play for the remainder of the frame). A variant known sometimes as bankboard has rubber cushions or 'banks' running the length of both sides of the table, instead of gutters, and as in billiards, the banks can be used to gain favorable position. A common and even smaller-scale British tabletop variant is shove ha'penny, played with coins, while a somewhat larger wooden-puck variant called sjoelen, which has much in common with the ball games bagatelle and skeeball, is played principally in the Netherlands.

=== Object of the game ===
The objective of the game is to slide, by hand, all four of one's Weights alternately against those of an opponent, so that they reach the highest scoring area without falling off the end of the board into the alley. Furthermore, a player's Weight(s) must be farther down the board than his opponent's Weight(s), in order to be in scoring position. This may be achieved either by knocking off the opponent's Weight(s), or by outdistancing them. Horse collar, the most common form of the game, is played to either 15 or, more typically, 21. Only the weights in front score.

The standard size of outdoor court is 52 feet long and 10 feet wide. For playing on surface, players hold stick like paddles to propel the pucks (biscuits/discs) into a numerical area that shows lines with specific scoring points.

== See also ==
- Curling
- Boules
- Golf
