= Bagatelle =

Billiards-type game

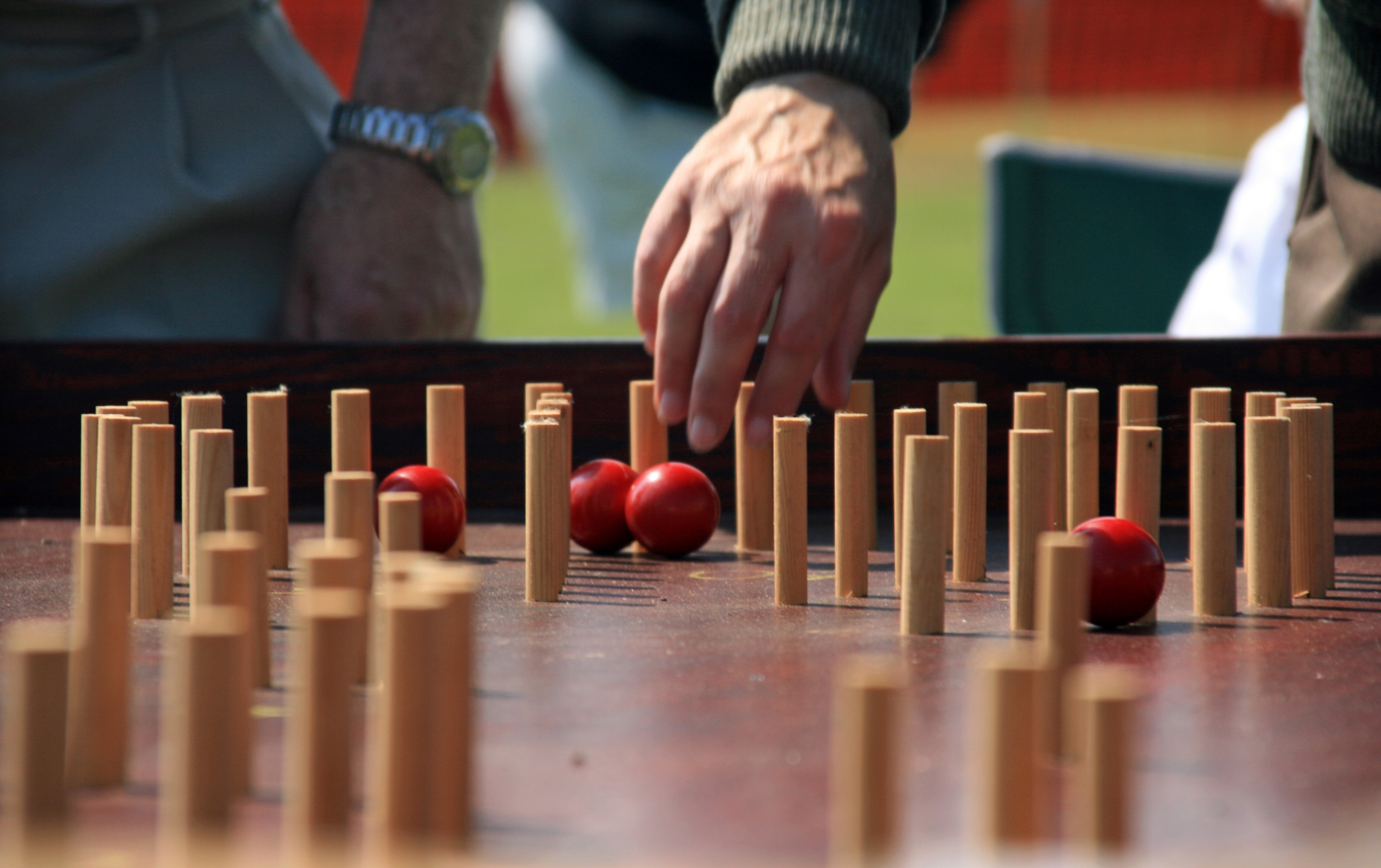
A game of bagatelle in progress.

Bagatelle (from the Château de Bagatelle) is a billiards-derived indoor table game, the object of which is to get a number of balls (set at nine in the 19th century; 4 whites, 4 reds and 1 black) past wooden pins (which act as obstacles) into holes that are guarded by wooden pegs; penalties are incurred if the pegs are knocked over. It probably developed from the table made with raised sides for trou madame, which was also played with ivory balls and continued to be popular into the later 19th century, after which it developed into bar billiards, with influences from the French/Belgian game billard russe (with supposed Russian origins). A bagatelle variant using fixed metal pins, billard japonais, eventually led to the development of pachinko and pinball.

== History ==
Table games involving sticks and balls evolved from efforts to bring outdoor games like ground billiards, croquet, and bowling inside for play during inclement weather. They are attested in general by the 15th century, although the 19th-century idea that bagatelle itself derived from the English "shovel-board" described in Charles Cotton's 1674 Compleat Gamester has since been disregarded.

=== France ===
In France, during the long 1643–1715 reign of Louis XIV, billiard tables were narrowed, with wooden pins or skittles at one end of the table, and players would shoot balls with a stick or cue from the other end, in a game inspired as much by bowling as billiards. Pins took too long to reset when knocked down, so they were eventually fixed to the table, and holes in the bed of the table became the targets. Players could ricochet balls off the pins to achieve the harder scorable holes. Quite a number of variations on this theme were developed.

In 1777, a party was thrown in honour of Louis XVI and the queen at the Château de Bagatelle, recently erected at great expense by the king's brother, the Count of Artois. Bagatelle from Italian bagattella, signifies 'a trifle', 'a decorative thing'. The highlight of the party was a new table game featuring a slender table and cue sticks, which players used to shoot ivory balls up an inclined playfield. The game was dubbed bagatelle by the count and shortly after swept through France.

=== UK and US ===
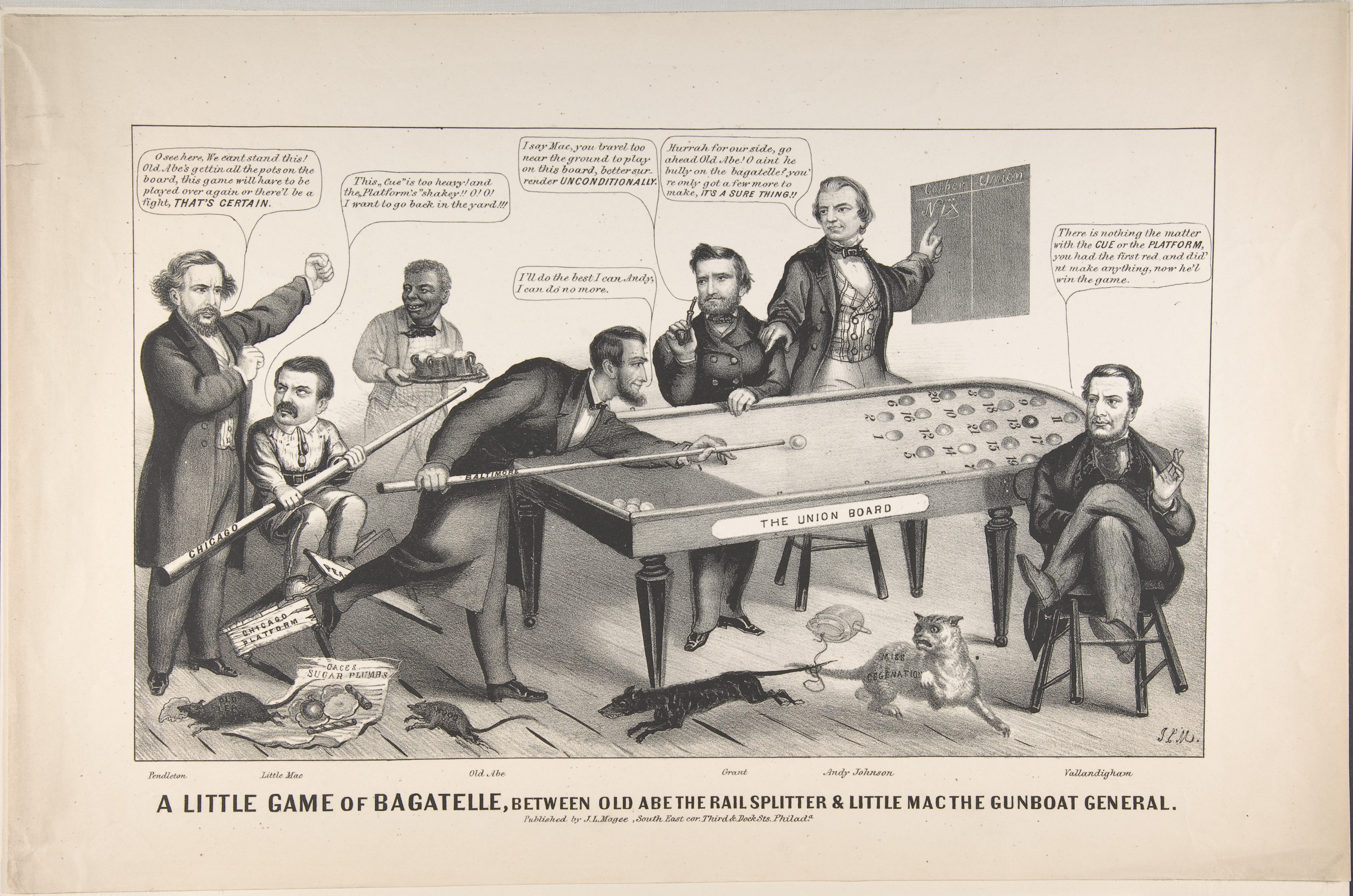
A Little Game of Bagatelle, Between Old Abe the Rail Splitter & Little Mac the Gunboat General

The name "bagatelle" was first used to describe such a game in 1819. Its dimensions soon standardised at 1 ft 9 in x 7 ft (53 cm x 213 cm). Some French soldiers carried their favorite bagatelle tables with them to America while helping to fight the British in the American Revolutionary War. Bagatelle spread and became so popular in America as well that a political cartoon from 1863 depicts US President Abraham Lincoln playing a small tabletop version of bagatelle against presidential rival George B. McClellan.

As of 2022, bagatelle is still played competitively in the Chester area of Cheshire, England. The Chester and District Bagatelle League is believed to be the last surviving bagatelle league in the world.

== See also ==
- Pub games
- Le multicolore
