= The Lakes, Las Vegas =

Planned community in Las Vegas, Nevada

Coordinates: 36°8′12″N 115°17′10″W

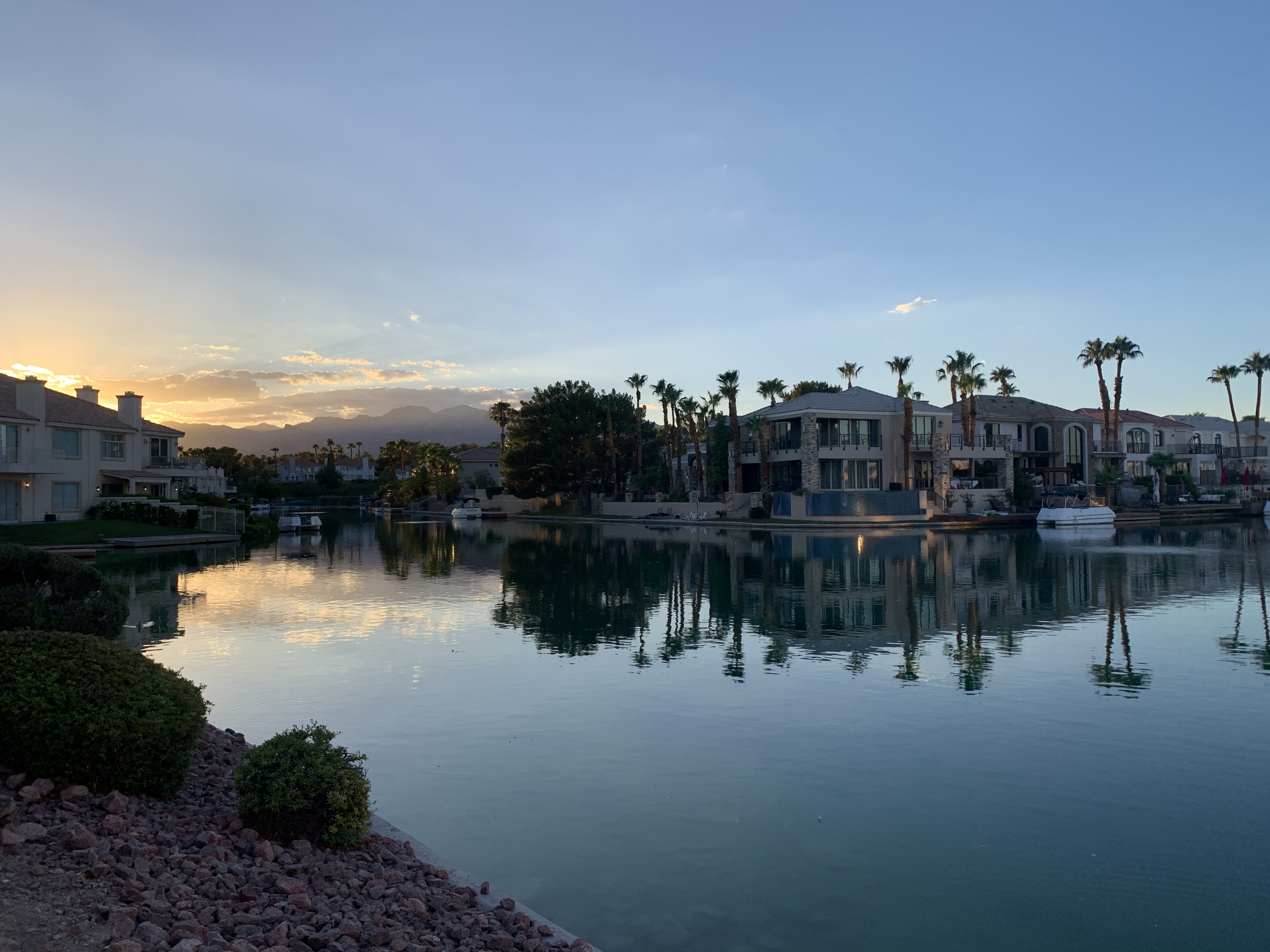
The Lakes

The Lakes is a 2-square-mile (5.2 km^{2}) planned community located within the city limits of Las Vegas, Nevada. It is located in the western part of the Las Vegas Valley near the Spring Mountains and Red Rock Canyon National Conservation Area. The centerpiece of the community, and its namesake, is a large man-made lake, Lake Sahara. It was originally planned to have two man-made lakes but was downscoped to one. It was built from the mid-1980s to the mid-1990s, and at the time was at the edge of development in the valley. It consists of a mixture of gated communities consisting of single-family homes, condominia, commercial areas and offices.

== Economy ==
Citicards, a subsidiary of Citibank, located its main Payment Processing Center here in 1985, as the centerpiece of The Lakes community. The United States Postal Service has since created two ZIP codes to handle the large volume of mail involved. In an effort to avoid having the negative connotation of credit card payments going to Las Vegas, these ZIP codes have been assigned the place name The Lakes, Nevada. Citibank transitioned the center to mortgage processing in the late 2000s, and closed the facility in 2014.
