= The Entertainment Capital of the World =

Nickname for several U.S. cities

The Entertainment Capital of the World is a nickname that has been applied to several American cities, including:

- Las Vegas, because of its "broad scope of entertainment options including nightlife, shows, exhibits, museums, theme parks, pool parties, and so on."
- Los Angeles (or, more specifically, Hollywood), due to its central role in the film, television, and music industries.
- New York City (or, more specifically, Broadway), due to the city's theater and television productions.

In a variation on the phrase, Branson, Missouri, United States, is known as the "Live Entertainment Capital of the World", owing to its array of approximately 50 theaters.
