= Le Cordon Bleu College of Culinary Arts Las Vegas =

Coordinates: 36.188014°N 115.312376°W

- Type: Private, For profit
- Active: 2003–2017
- President: Jennifer White; Heinz Lauer (Head Chef}
- Students: 587
- Address: 1451 Center Crossing Road, Las Vegas, Nevada, USA

Le Cordon Bleu College of Culinary Arts Las Vegas was a culinary school owned by Career Education Corporation under a licensing agreement with Le Cordon Bleu in Paris.

The school opened in 2003 and stopped accepting applications as of April 2016. All US Cordon Bleu College locations were closed in 2017.

== Academics ==
Tuition ranged from $16,000 to more than $40,000. The 15-month, full-time program offered an Associate of Occupational Science degree.

== Campus ==
Las Vegas was the site of the school's first stand-alone facility with six production kitchens, four demonstration classes, four management classes and a computer classroom.

In May of 2003, the school opened a fine-dining restaurant
