= Kessinger =

Kessinger may refer to:

== Persons ==
- Clark Kessinger (1896–1975), American old-time fiddler
- Don Kessinger (born 1942), American former professional baseball player and manager
- Grae Kessinger (born 1997), American baseball player
- Jan Kessinger (born 1951), American politician
- Kayla Kessinger (born 1993), American politician
- Keith Kessinger (born 1967), American baseball player and coach
- Kent Kessinger (active from 1988), American football coach and former player
- Ted Kessinger (born 1941), American football coach

== Others ==
- Kessinger Publishing, American publishing company

== See also ==
- Kissinger (disambiguation)
