= List of University of Mississippi alumni =

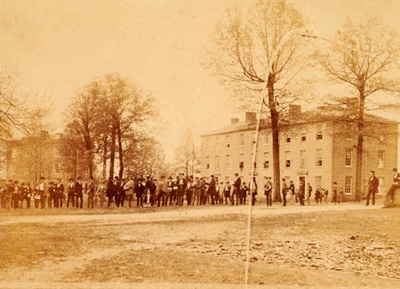
The class of 1861

The following is a list of notable alumni of the University of Mississippi (Ole Miss).

== Activists ==
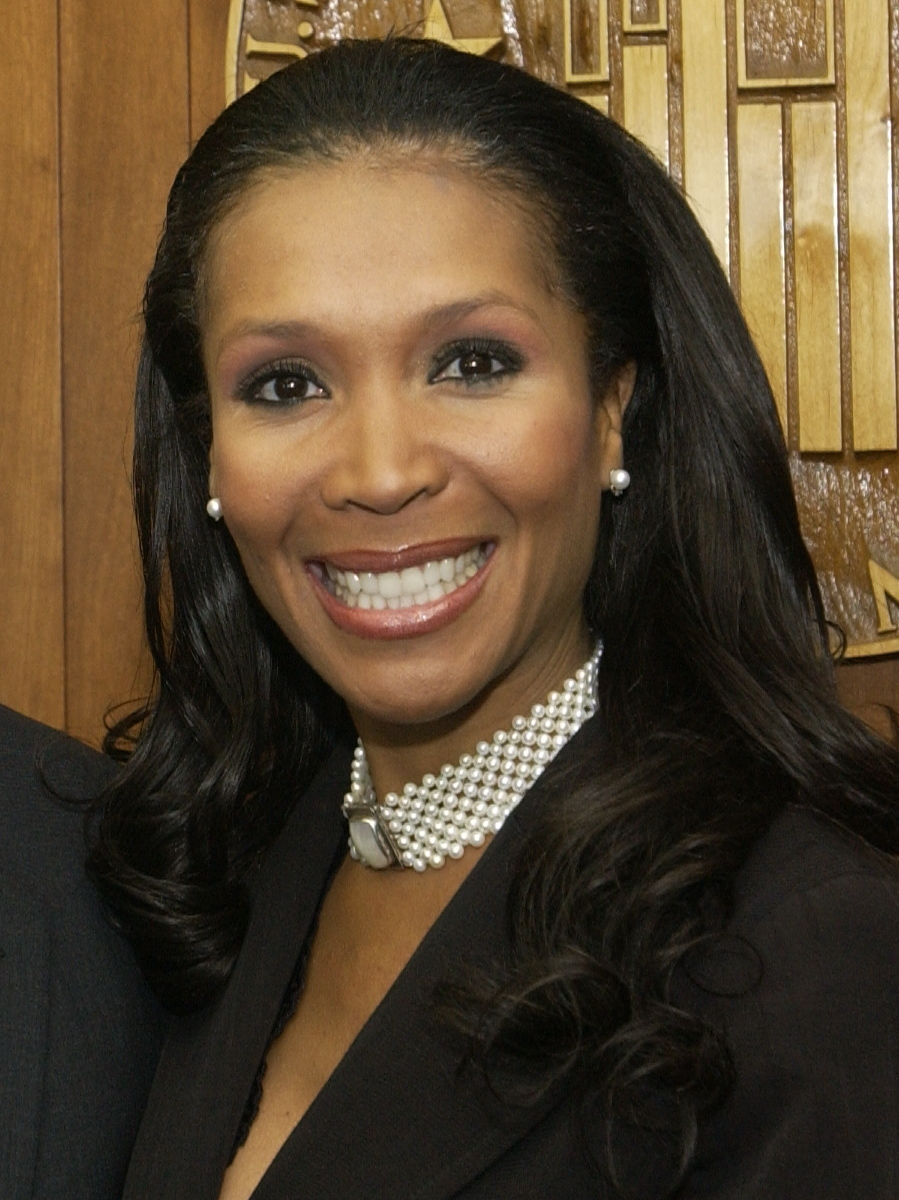
Angela McGlowan

- Abelhaleem Hasan Abdelraziq Ashqar, Palestinian political scientist, activist
- Angela McGlowan (born 1970), Republican political commentator, author, and consultant
- James Meredith, first African American student at Ole Miss; leader in the American civil rights movement

== Actors and models ==
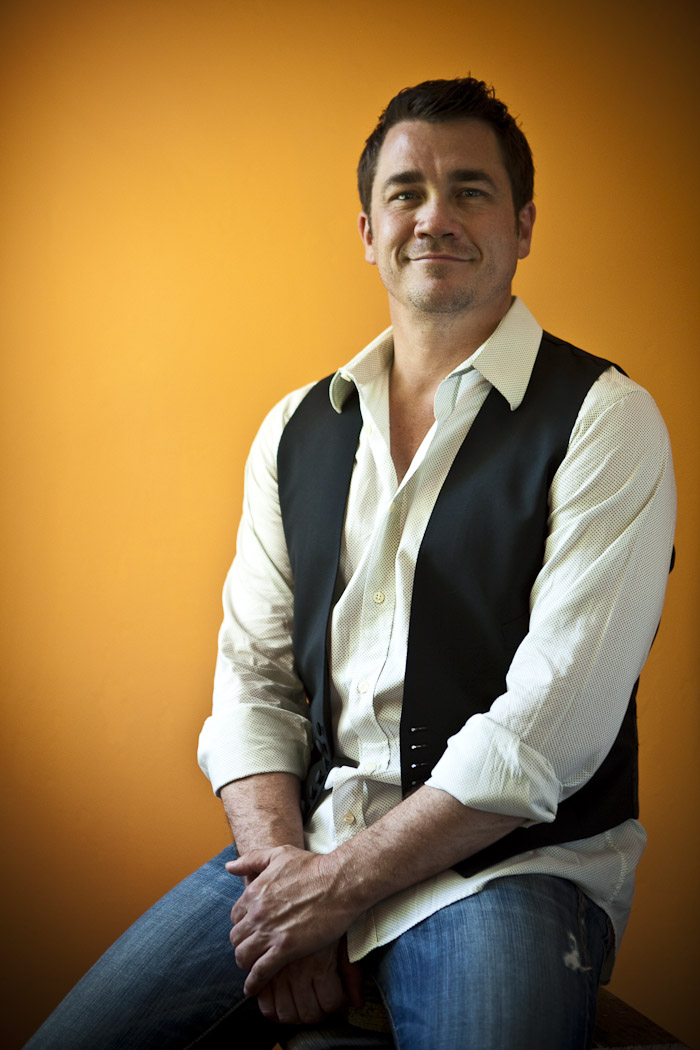
Tate Taylor

- Susan Akin-Lynch, Miss America 1986
- Tate Ellington, actor
- Cynthia Geary, actress
- Anthony Herrera (1944–2011), actor
- Kate Jackson, actress
- Tom Lester, actor
- Heather McMahan, actress and comedian
- Gerald McRaney, actor
- Mary Ann Mobley (1937–2014), Miss America 1959; actress
- Lynda Mead Shea, Miss America 1960
- Tate Taylor, director of The Help
- Larry A. Thompson, film producer and talent manager

== Artists ==
- William Eggleston, photographer
- Ron Gorchov (1930–2020), artist
- William R. Hollingsworth Jr. (1910–1944), painter
- Lawrence Arthur Jones (1910–1996), muralist and printmaker
- Glennray Tutor, photorealist painter

== Athletics ==
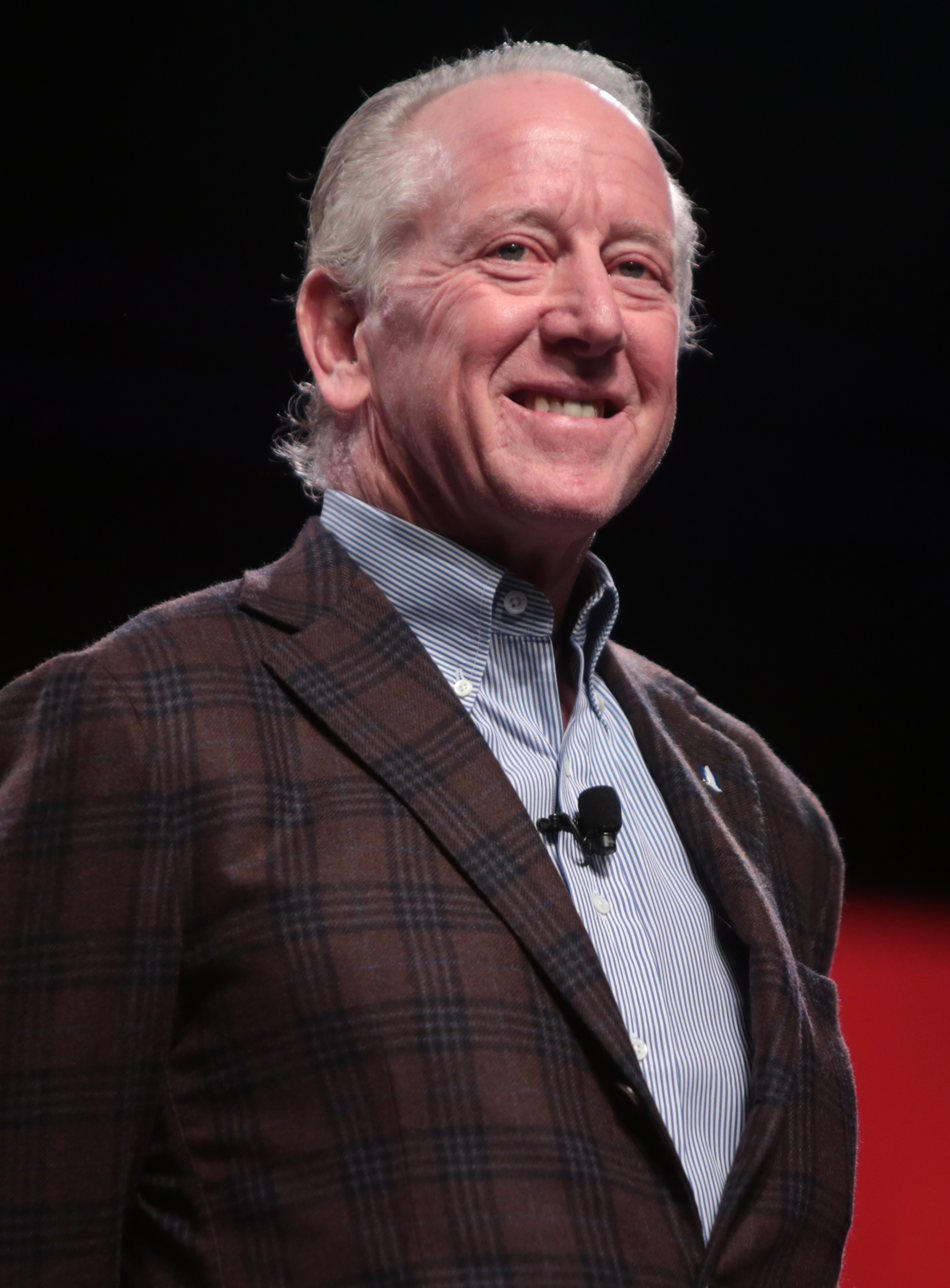
Archie Manning

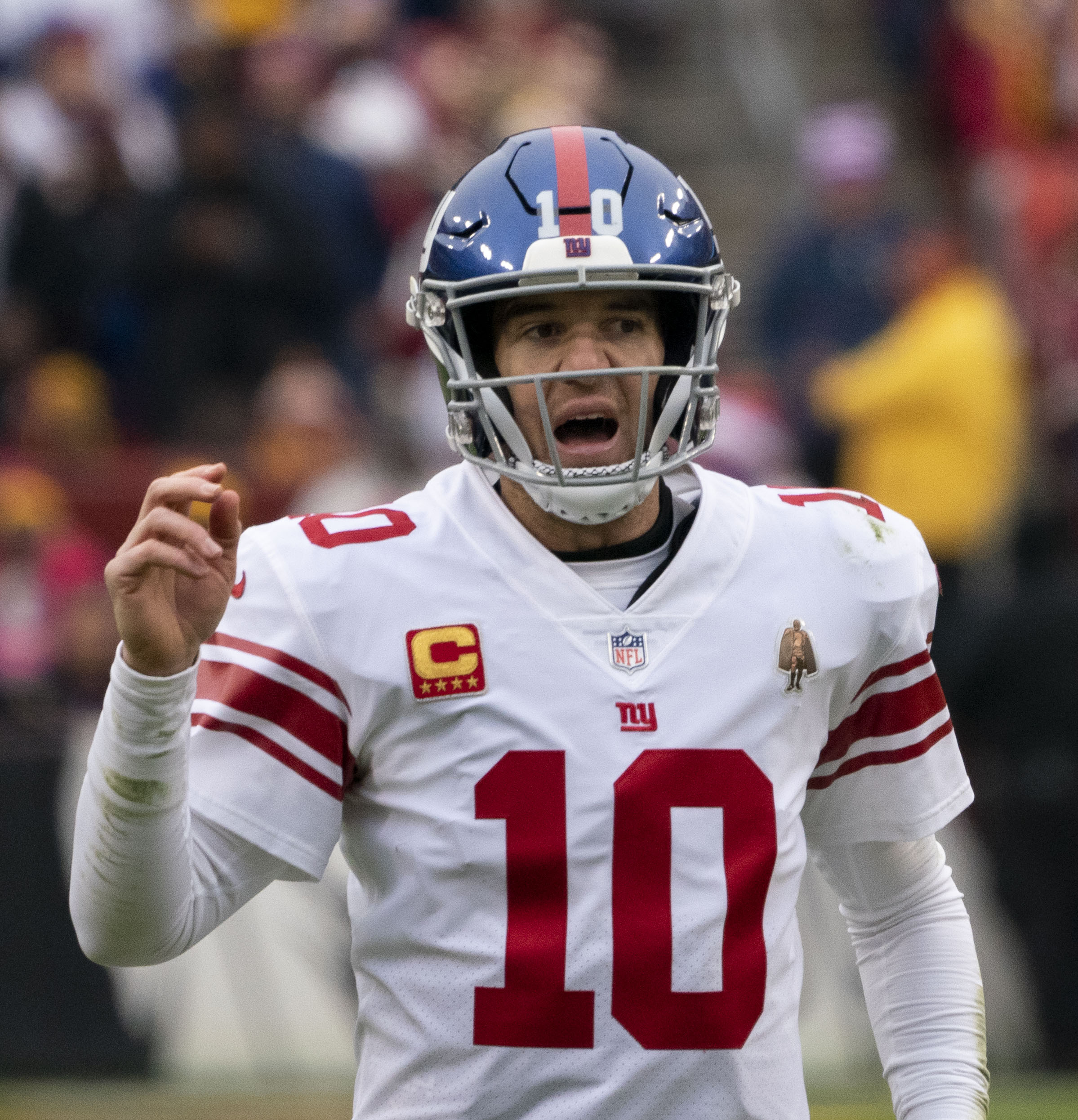
Eli Manning

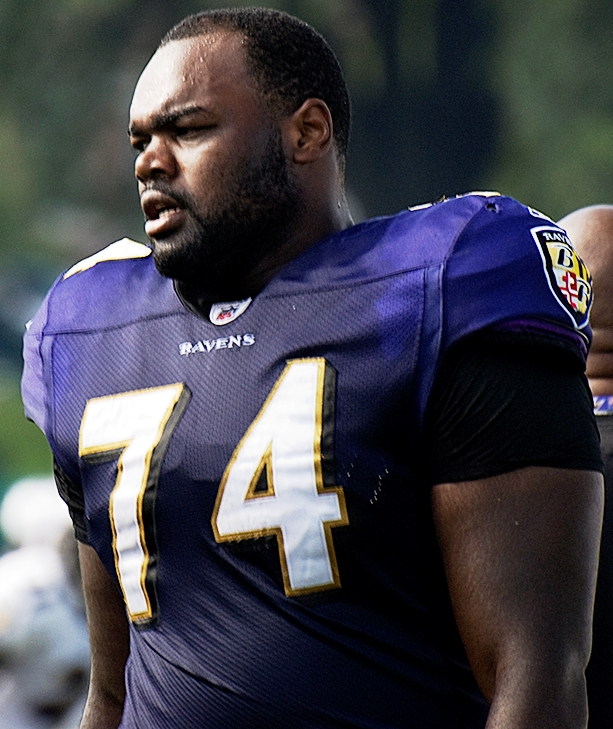
Michael Oher

- Tyji Armstrong, NFL tight end
- Kent Austin, CFL quarterback and head coach
- Shakira Austin (born 2000), basketball center for the Israeli Elitzur Ramla
- Coolidge Ball, college basketball coach
- Doby Bartling (1913–1992), college football, basketball and baseball coach
- Reginald Becton, professional basketball player
- Gwen Berry, hammer thrower
- Mahesh Bhupathi, professional tennis player
- George Blair, AFL defensive back
- Pete Boone, college athletic director
- Billy Brewer, college football coach
- Johnny Brewer (1937–2011), NFL tight end, linebacker
- Alundis Brice, NFL cornerback
- A. J. Brown, NFL wide receiver
- Jeff Calhoun, major league pitcher
- Mickey Callaway, major league pitcher; manager
- Van Chancellor, women's basketball coach
- Chris Coghlan, major league outfielder
- Charlie Conerly, NFL quarterback
- James "Bus" Cook, NFL sports agent
- Bill Courtney, high school football coach, subject of documentary film Undefeated
- Zack Cozart, baseball shortstop and third baseman for the San Francisco Giants
- Bobby Crespino, NFL tight end
- Doug Cunningham (1945–2015), NFL running back
- Roland Dale, NFL end
- Terence Davis, NBA basketball player
- Eagle Day, NFL punter, CFL quarterback
- Tony Dees, field and track, Olympic medalist
- David Dellucci, major league outfielder
- Jim Dunaway, NFL defensive tackle
- Perry Lee Dunn, NFL running back
- Patrick Eddie, NBA basketball player
- Tim Elko, MLB first baseman
- Doug Elmore (1939–2002), NFL punter
- Evan Engram, NFL tight end
- Jeff Fassero, major league pitcher
- Charlie Flowers, AFL football player
- John Fourcade, NFL quarterback
- Bobby Franklin, NFL safety, college football coach
- Rufus French, NFL tight end
- Jake Gibbs, major league catcher, college baseball coach
- Kline Gilbert (1930–1987), NFL offensive tackle
- Jennifer Gillom, Olympic medalist, professional basketball player
- Larry Grantham, NFL, AFL linebacker
- Parker Hall (1916–2005), NFL quarterback
- Greg Hardy, NFL defensive end
- Gene Hickerson (1935–2008), NFL offensive guard
- Antwon Hicks, Olympic hurdler
- Stan Hindman (1944–2020), NFL defensive lineman
- Gunnar Hoglund, MLB pitcher
- Candice Holley (born 1981), basketball player
- Von Hutchins, NFL defensive back
- Peria Jerry, NFL defensive end
- Chad Kelly, professional football player
- Sam Kendricks, pole vaulter, Olympic medalist
- Don Kessinger, MLB shortstop, All-Star, and Gold Glove Award winner, and Ole Miss head baseball coach
- Grae Kessinger, MLB shortstop
- Keith Kessinger, MLB shortstop and head baseball coach for Arkansas State Red Wolves
- Bobby Kielty, major league outfielder
- Frank Kinard (1914–1985), NFL offensive tackle
- Dawson Knox, NFL tight end
- Greg Little, NFL offensive tackle
- Ken Lucas, NFL cornerback
- Archie Manning, NFL quarterback, father of NFL quarterbacks Peyton Manning and Eli Manning
- Eli Manning (class of 2003), NFL quarterback
- Deuce McAllister, NFL running back
- Dexter McCluster, NFL wide receiver
- DK Metcalf, NFL wide receiver
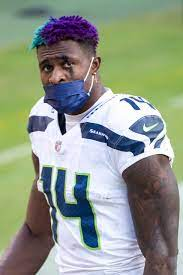
  Dk Metcalf
- Cary Middlecoff (1921–1998), professional golfer
- Donte Moncrief, NFL wide receiver
- Doug Nikhazy, MLB pitcher
- Michael Oher, NFL offensive tackle
- Ashlee Palmer, NFL linebacker
- Jermey Parnell, NFL offensive tackle
- Pat "Gravy" Patterson, college baseball coach
- Jimmy Patton (1933–1973), NFL defensive back
- Drew Pomeranz, major league pitcher
- Barney Poole (1923–2005), NFL end
- James E. "Buster" Poole (1915–1994), NFL wide receiver
- Ray Poole (1921–2008), NFL end
- Armintie Price, pro basketball player
- Kelvin Pritchett, NFL defensive tackle
- Brittney Reese, long jumper, Olympic gold medalist
- Ricky Robertson, Olympic high jumper
- Ryan Rolison, MLB pitcher
- Carol Ross, NCAA and WNBA women's basketball coach
- Jamarca Sanford, NFL safety
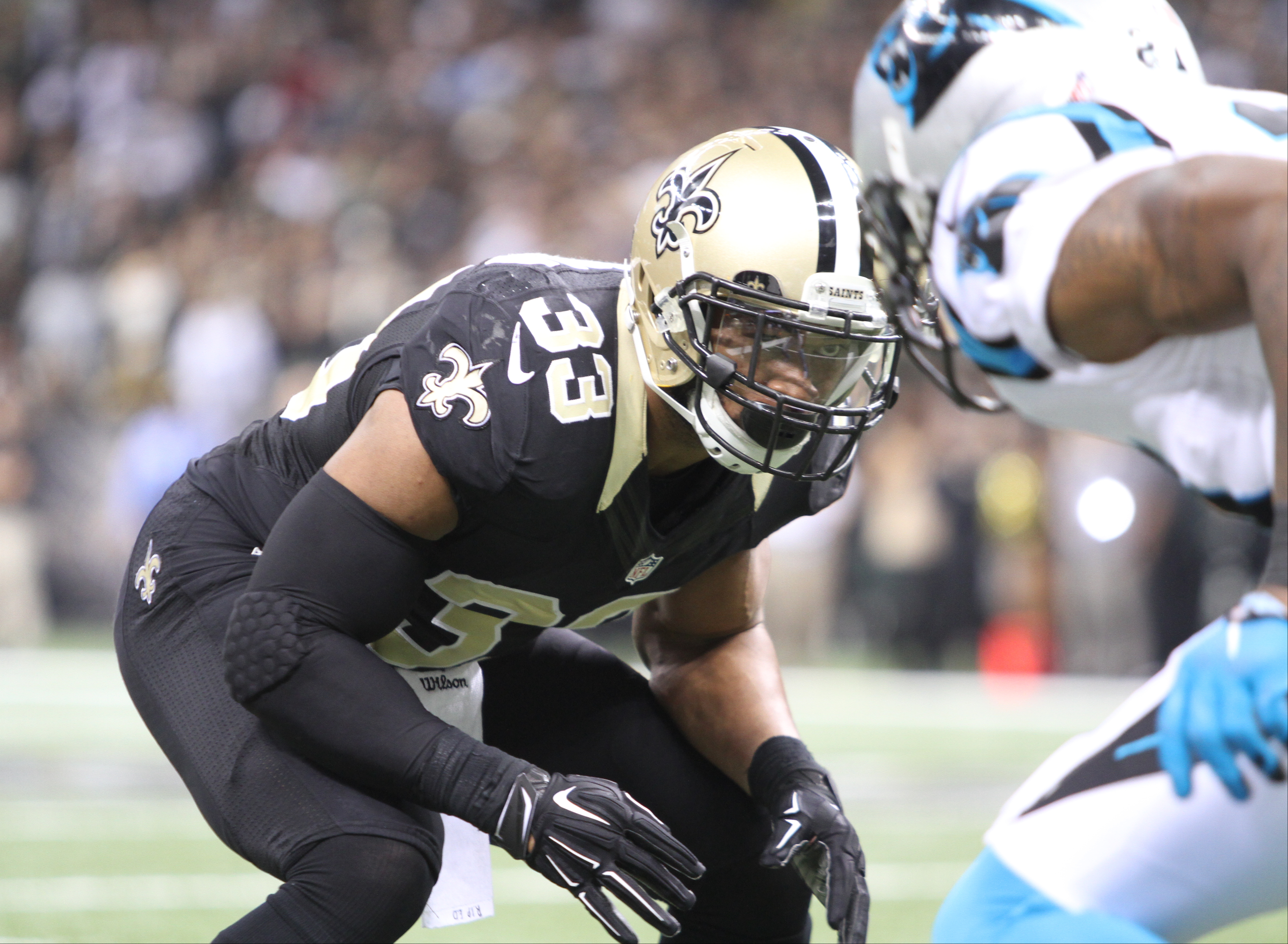
  Jamarca Sanford
- Seth Smith, MLB outfielder
- Chris Snopek, major league infielder
- Rafaelle Souza, Brazilian soccer player
- Savanté Stringfellow, world champion and Olympic long jumper
- Marvin Terrell, AFL guard
- Matt Tolbert, major league infielder
- Sean Tuohy, sports commentator, restaurateur
- Guy Turnbow (1908–1975), NFL tackle
- Todd Wade, NFL offensive tackle
- Gee Walker (1908–1981), major league outfielder
- Mike Wallace, NFL wide receiver
- Wesley Walls, All-Pro NFL tight-end
- Chris Warren, pro basketball player
- Terrence Watson (born 1987), American-Israeli basketball player in the Israeli Premier League
- Skeeter Webb (1909–1986), major league infielder
- Michael White, college basketball coach
- Romello White (born 1998), basketball player for Hapoel Eilat of the Israeli Basketball Premier League
- Patrick Willis, NFL linebacker
- Isiah Young (born 1990), Olympic sprinter

== Authors ==
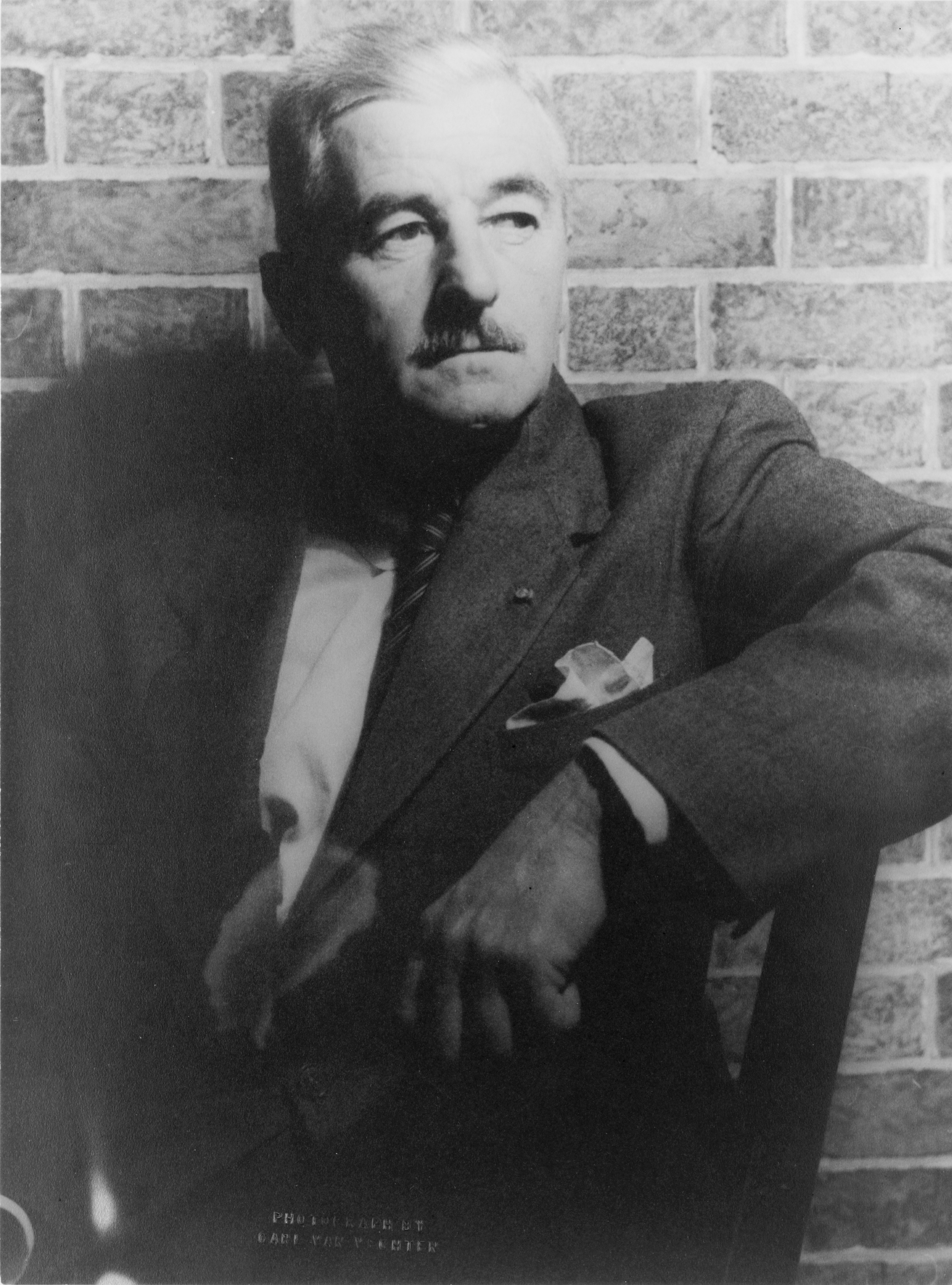
William Faulkner

- Howard Bahr, novelist
- Larry Brown (1951–2004), author
- Hubert Creekmore (1907–1966), author
- Ellen Douglas (pen name of Josephine Haxton, 1921–2012), novelist
- Winifred Hamrick Farrar (1923–2010), Mississippi poet laureate
- John Faulkner (1901–1963), plain-style writer, brother of William Faulkner
- William Faulkner (1897–1962), author, Nobel laureate
- John Grisham, author, attorney, state representative
- Carolyn Haines, author
- Greg Iles, novelist, screenwriter
- Florence King, humorist and political columnist (attended graduate school but did not complete the program)
- Prakash Kona, essayist, poet
- Florence Mars (1923–2006), author
- Jonathan Miles, journalist, novelist
- Melany Neilson, author
- Stel Pavlou, British author, screenwriter (studied as an exchange student)
- Genevieve Pou (1919–2007), author
- Patrick D. Smith, author
- Robert Bruce Smith, IV, Mississippi historian
- Donna Tartt, author, attended but transferred before graduation
- Paige Williams, author and staff writer for The New Yorker
- Stark Young, playwright, novelist, and drama critic

== Business figures ==
- James L. Barksdale (born 1943), businessman
- Dixie Carter (born 1964), businesswoman
- Barry Dixon (born 1959), interior designer
- Ernest Duff (1931–2016), businessman, lawyer and bishop
- Thomas F. Frist Sr. (1910–1998), businessman and physician
- Bill Jordan, businessman and host
- William Bonner McCarty, businessman
- Leigh Anne Tuohy (born 1960), businesswoman and interior designer

== Educators and academic administrators ==
- David Beckley (M.A.1975, Ph.D. 1986), president of Rust College and Wiley College
- Glenn Boyce, chancellor of Ole Miss
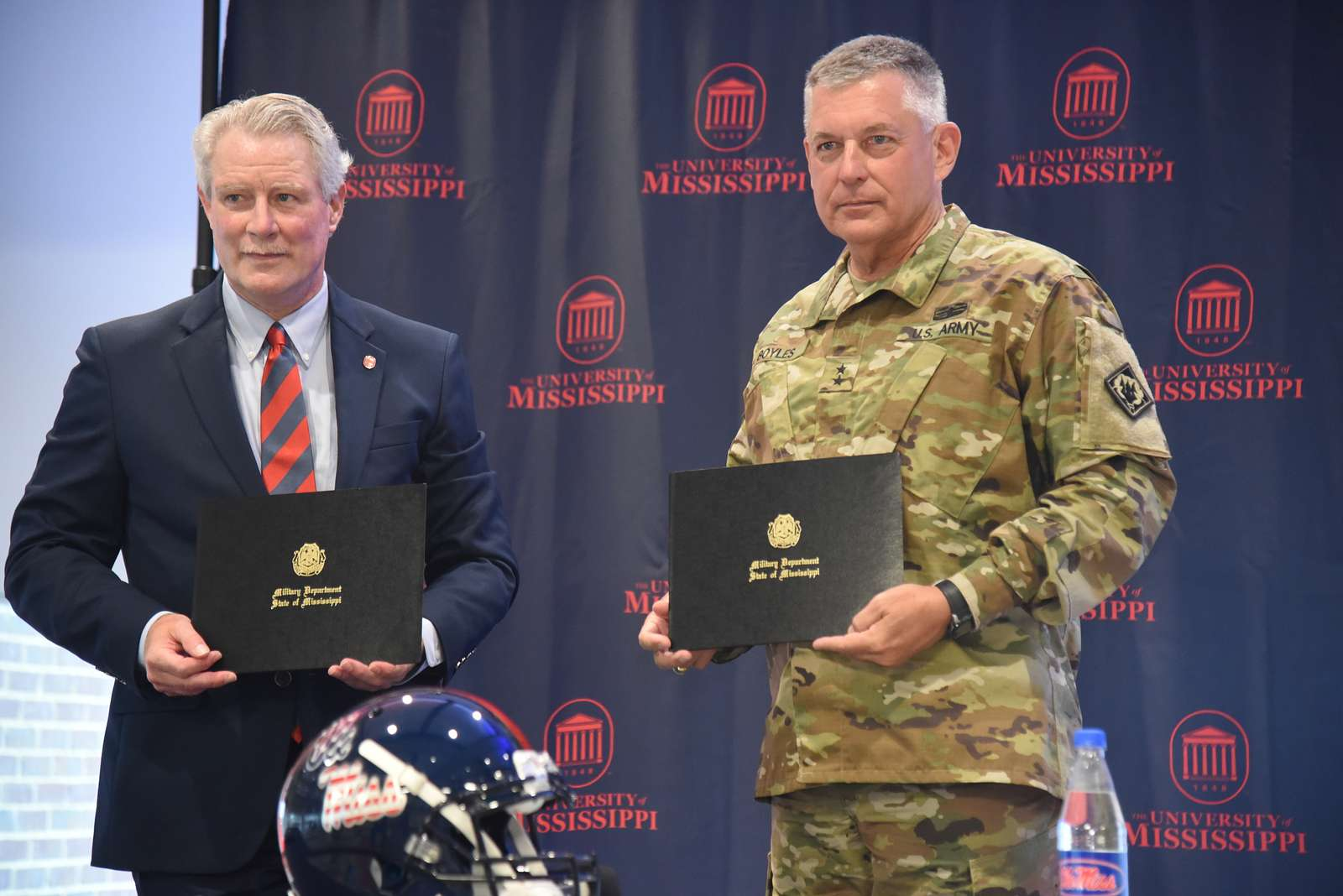
  Glenn Boyce
- John L. Crain, president of Southeastern Louisiana University
- Mike Edmonds, acting president of Colorado College 2020–2021, first Black president of Colorado College
- Henry Minor Faser (1882–1960), dean, School of Pharmacy
- Charles Betts Galloway (1849–1909), Methodist bishop
- James Bruton Gambrell (1841–1921), president of Mercer University
- Thomas Hines, professor emeritus of History, University of California, Los Angeles
- Daniel Jones, physician, UM chancellor
- Robert Khayat, UM chancellor
- Rory Lee, clergyman, college president
- E. Wilson Lyon, president of Pomona College
- Edward Mayes (1846–1917), UM chancellor
- William David McCain (1907–1993), segregationist spokesman, president of University of Southern Mississippi
- Thomas K. McCraw (1940–2012), business historian
- Milburn Price, hymnologist, music educator
- Frederick G. Slabach, president of Texas Wesleyan University
- Ella King Torrey (1957–2003), scholar, academic administrator; president of San Francisco Art Institute

== Journalists and media figures ==
- Sharyn Alfonsi, 60 Minutes, reporter
- Chris Berry, iHeartMedia
- Russ Dallen, publisher of Latin American Herald Tribune, journalist, author
- Ben Ferguson, radio host and commentator
- John Fortenberry, film and television director
- Ron Franklin, ESPN sportscaster
- Angela McGlowan, political commentator
- Donald C. Simmons, Jr., documentary filmmaker and author
- Larry Speakes, White House press secretary, journalist, author
- Curtis Wilkie, author, journalist

== Jurists and attorneys ==
- Rhesa Barksdale (born 1944), U.S. court of appeals judge
- Neal Brooks Biggers Jr. (1935–2023), U.S. district judge
- Debra M. Brown (born 1963), U.S. district judge
- George C. Carlson Jr., chief justice of the Mississippi Supreme Court
- Charles Clark (1925–2011), U.S. court of appeals judge
- Glen H. Davidson (born 1941), U.S. district judge
- Bobby DeLaughter (born 1954), prosecutor, judge
- Jess H. Dickinson (born 1947), associate justice, Mississippi Supreme Court
- Jim Hood (born 1962), Mississippi attorney general
- Charles Bowen Howry (1844–1928), assistant U.S. attorney general, court of claims judge
- E. Grady Jolly (1937–2026), U.S. court of appeals judge
- Ann Hannaford Lamar (born 1952), associate justice, Mississippi Supreme Court
- Michael P. Mills (born 1956), U.S. district judge
- Mike Moore (born 1952), Mississippi attorney general
- Charles W. Pickering (born 1937), U.S. district judge
- Michael K. Randolph (born 1946), associate justice, Mississippi Supreme Court
- Richard Scruggs (born 1946), trial attorney
- Sydney M. Smith (1869–1948), chief justice of the Mississippi Supreme Court
- Keith Starrett (born 1951), U.S. district judge
- Phil Stone (1893–1967), attorney
- Bill Waller Jr. (born 1952), chief justice, Mississippi Supreme Court

== Military figures ==
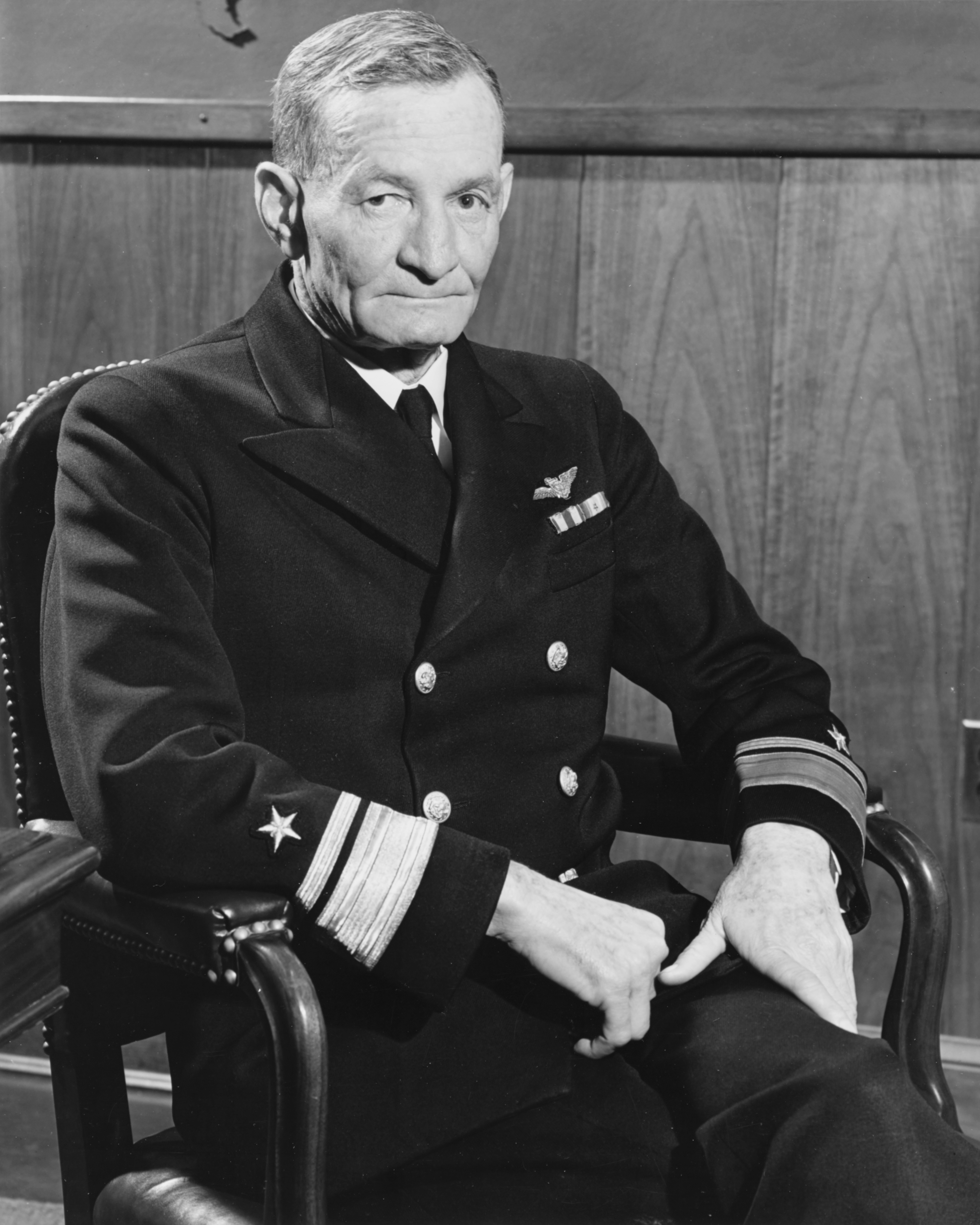
John S. McCain, Sr.

- Charles P. Hall (1886–1953), lieutenant general, World War II
- Paul V. Hester, Air Force general
- John S. McCain, Sr. (1884–1945), U.S. Navy admiral

== Musicians ==
- Mildred Allen, operatic soprano
- Mose Allison, jazz and blues pianist
- Glen Ballard, songwriter, producer
- Colour Revolt, indie rock band
- Caroline Herring, singer, songwriter
- Guy Hovis, singer
- Josh Kelley, musician
- Vincent Mason, singer-songwriter
- Dent May, singer-songwriter
- George McConnell, guitarist, musician
- Rivers Rutherford, country songwriter
- John Stirratt, bassist (The Hilltops, Wilco)
- Nancy Van de Vate, composer
- Jim Weatherly, singer-songwriter

== Physicians ==
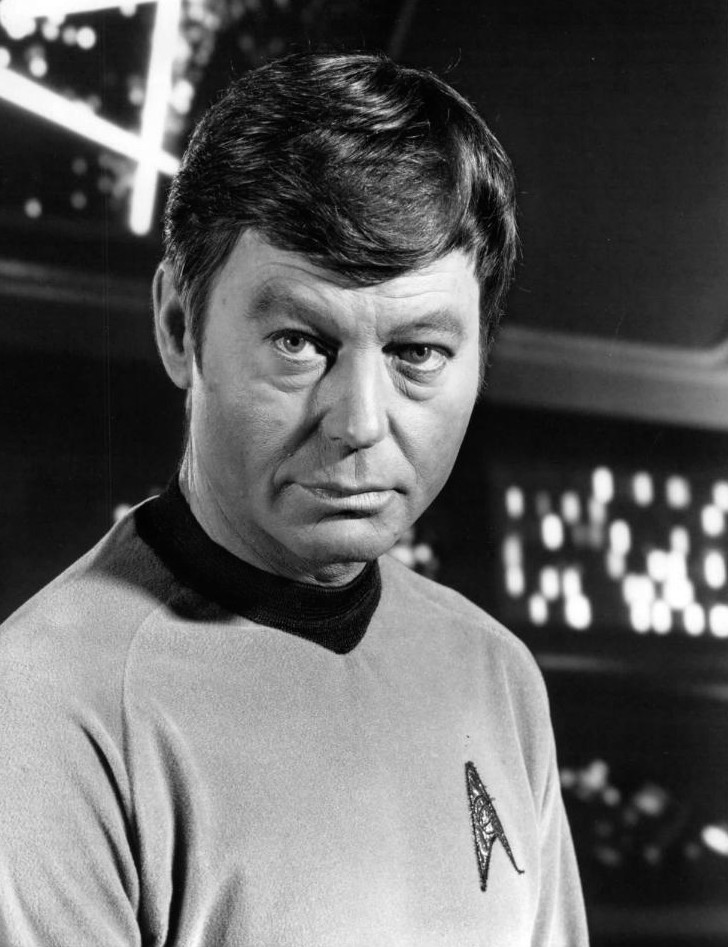
Fictional Star Trek character Leonard McCoy

- Carlos Manuel Chavez, heart surgeon
- Garth Fisher, plastic surgeon
- John C. Fleming (born 1951), family physician, U.S. representative
- Thomas F. Frist, Sr. (1910–1998), cardiologist, founder of Hospital Corporation of America
- Arthur Guyton (1919–2003), physiologist, author of Textbook of Medical Physiology
- Edward Hill, family physician, AMA president
- Leonard McCoy (2227–2364), fictional Star Trek character; chief medical officer, USS Enterprise, Starfleet admiral

== Politicians ==
- Thomas Abernethy (1903–1998), U.S. representative
- William Allain (1928–2013), governor
- John Mills Allen (1846–1917), U.S. representative
- Chapman L. Anderson (1845–1924), U.S. representative
- Rick Austin, Georgia state representative
- Haley Barbour, governor
- Ross Barnett (1898–1987), governor
- Earl L. Brewer (1869–1942), governor
- Ed Bryant, U.S. representative from Tennessee
- T. Jeff Busby (1884–1964), U.S. representative

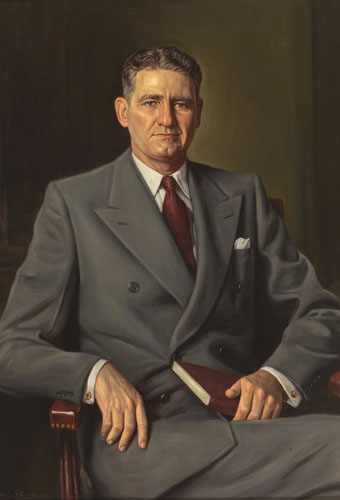
Portrait of Florida Governor Millard Caldwell

- Millard F. Caldwell (1897–1984), governor of Florida
- Ezekiel S. Candler, Jr. (1862–1944), U.S. representative
- Thomas C. Catchings (1847–1927), U.S. representative
- Marvin Childers (born 1961), Arkansas state representative
- Travis Childers, U.S. representative
- Thad Cochran (1937–2019), U.S. senator
- James Collier (1872–1933), U.S. representative
- Ross A. Collins (1880–1968), U.S. representative
- Robert H. Conn, assistant secretary of the Navy
- Martin Sennett Conner (1891–1950), governor
- Walter M. Denny (1853–1926), U.S. representative
- Aubert C. Dunn (1896–1987), U.S. representative
- Winfield Dunn, governor of Tennessee
- Brad Dye, lieutenant governor
- James O. Eastland (1904–1986), U.S. senator
- Cliff Finch (1927–1986), governor
- John C. Fleming, U.S. representative from Louisiana
- William Webster Franklin, U.S. representative
- Evelyn Gandy (1920–2007), lieutenant governor
- Mary Lou Godbold (1912–2008), state senator
- James Gordon (1833–1912), U.S. senator
- Gregg Harper, U.S. representative
- Jon Hinson (1942–1995), U.S. representative
- Jim Hood, state attorney general
- Jay Hughes, state representative, candidate for lieutenant governor (2019)
- Kenny Hulshof, U.S. representative from Missouri
- Paul B. Johnson, Jr. (1916–1985), governor
- Trent Kelly, U.S. representative

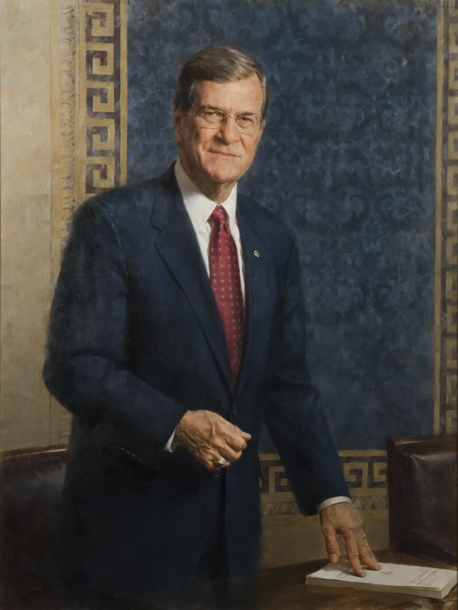
Lott's official Senate portrait

- Trent Lott, U.S. senator
- William F. Love (1850–1898), U.S. representative
- Ray Mabus, governor of Mississippi; secretary of the Navy
- Dan R. McGehee (1883–1962), U.S. representative
- Frank A. McLain (1852–1920), U.S. representative
- Hernando Money (1839–1912), U.S. senator
- Mike Moore, state attorney general
- Johnny Morgan (1947–2023), Mississippi state senator
- Stanford Morse (1926–2002), state senator
- Henry L. Muldrow (1837–1905), U.S. representative; assistant secretary of the interior
- Ronnie Musgrove, governor
- Rita Potts Parks (born 1962), state senator
- Chip Pickering, U.S. representative
- John E. Rankin (1882–1960), U.S. representative
- Lee M. Russell (1875–1943), governor
- Jeanne Shaheen, governor of New Hampshire; U.S. senator
- Roosevelt Skerrit, prime minister of Dominica
- Frank E. Smith (1918–1997), U.S. representative
- Larry Speakes (1939–2014), presidential press secretary

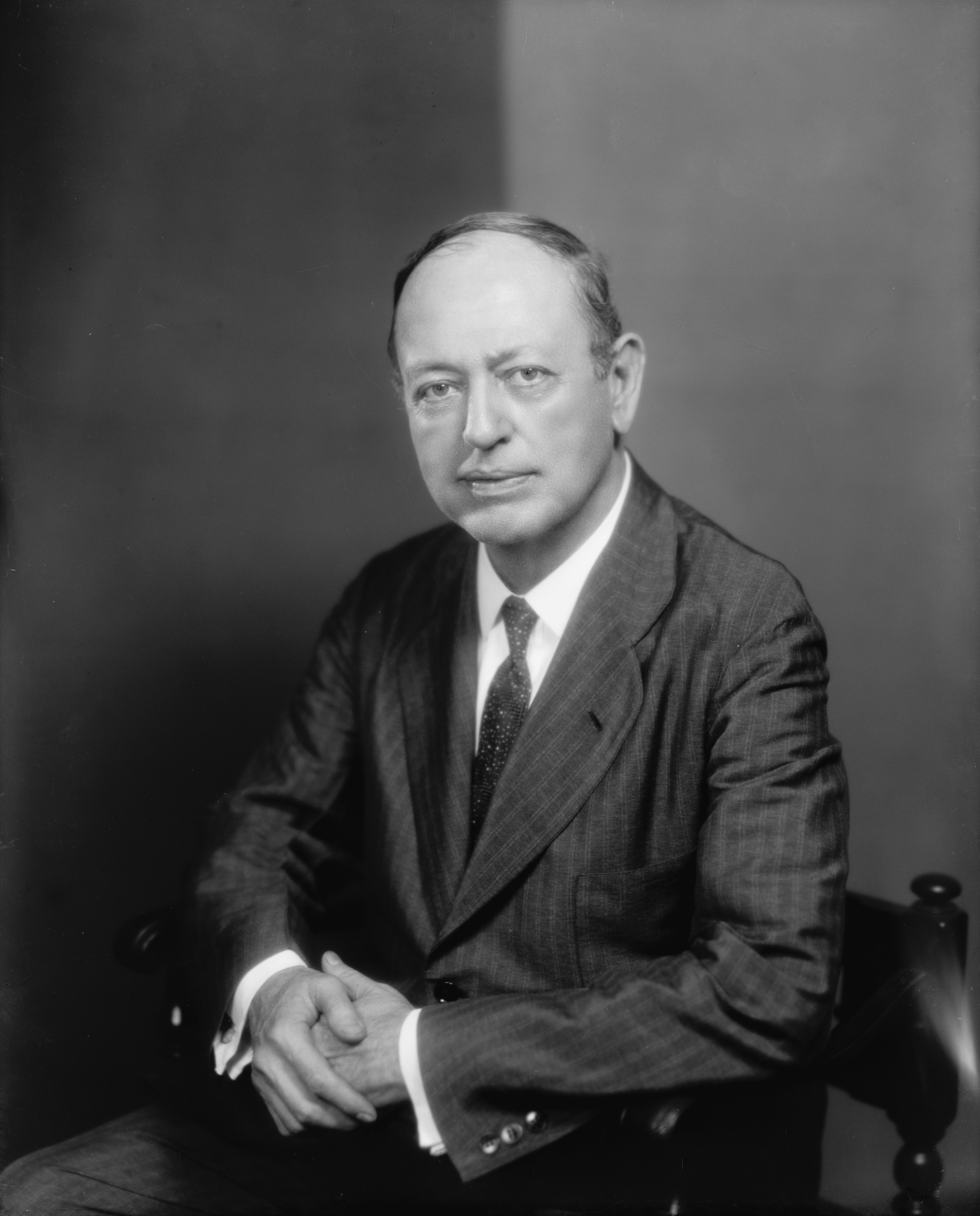
U.S. Senator and Congressman Hubert Stephens

- Hubert D. Stephens (1875–1946), U.S. senator and congressman
- William V. Sullivan (1857–1918), U.S. senator
- Kirk Talbot, Louisiana state representative
- Gray Tollison, state senator
- William W. Venable (1880–1948), U.S. representative
- A.C. Wharton (1944–2015), mayor of Memphis, Tennessee
- Hugh L. White (1881–1965), governor
- Jamie Whitten (1910–1995), U.S representative
- William Madison Whittington (1878–1962), U.S. representative
- Roger Wicker, U.S. senator
- John Bell Williams (1918–1983), governor
- Elise Varner Winter, First Lady of Mississippi
- William Winter (1923–2020), governor
- Samuel Andrew Witherspoon (1855–1915), U.S. representative

== Religious leaders ==
- Jackson Biggers (born 1937), bishop of the Diocese of Northern Malawi
- Duncan M. Gray III (born 1949), bishop of the Episcopal Diocese of Mississippi
- Alfred C. Marble, Jr. (1936–2017), bishop of the Episcopal Diocese of Mississippi
- C. Brinkley Morton (1926–1994), bishop of the Episcopal Diocese of San Diego

== Scientists ==
- Weston Fulton (1871–1946), meteorologist and inventor
- Pedro Rodriguez (born 1953), director of test laboratory at NASA's Marshall Space Flight Center

== Other ==
- Nelma Crutcher (1950–2022), president general of the United Daughters of the Confederacy
