= NOVA Lighting =

NOVA Lighting or "NOVA of California" is a Venice Beach, California-based manufacturer of California modern lighting and home décor designs. Customers include top furniture retailers, specialty retailers, department stores, catalog buyers, e-tailers, event planners, mass merchants/ home improvement retailers, lighting showrooms, model home designers and hospitality clients.

== History ==
Established in 1923 as NOVA Manufacturing by the Langbaum and Moskowitz family in Brooklyn, New York, the company has maintained its position as a manufacturer of contemporary residential lamps over the years. In 1956, the Moskowitz family began a branch of the company in Los Angeles, California, which ultimately became Nova/MelMar of California. In 1962, the owners met Achille and Pier Castiglione at the Milan furniture fair and purchased one of their arco lamps. Along with Peter Morelli, their Viennese Design Director, they began to build a range of arc lamps for the U.S. market. The company was acquired by an investment company in 1989 and would change ownership in 1993, and is now known as NOVA of California. With an MBA from UCLA with an emphasis in marketing and finance, Daniel Edelist has been president of the company since 1993.

Through a series of targeted acquisitions, NOVA has expanded its product category resources and production capabilities over the years. In August 2000, NOVA added a range of new materials and methods to its offerings though the acquisition of CBC Classic Brass, a medium priced contemporary lamp manufacturer, as well as a key competitor in the arc lamp category at the time. In July 2007, NOVA acquired American Lamp Company, as well as Jon Gilmore Designs, Inc, a contemporary wall décor company that mixes aluminum, wood and acrylic to form innovative wall art, clocks, mirrors, accent furniture and storage. With this acquisition, NOVA accelerated its growth into wall décor. Jon Gilmore, CEO of Jon Gilmore Designs, joined the company as chief designer.

In 2007, the company also launched the NOVA Art Studio line of three-dimensional metal crafts for wall art, table and floor sculpture and functional art.

In 2008, NOVA opened a domestic prototype operation in Orange County, CA, which Jon Gilmore uses as a laboratory for new innovations, ideas and short run production. The company also opened NOVA Mexico, a factory based 120 miles to the south of Los Angeles, where the team has built a well-managed manufacturing capability that offers increased flexibility, allows NOVA to react quickly to market trends and changes, and provides manufacturing options that are not available in China. In turn, NOVA is also now able to produce higher volume production at lower costs and more tooling-intensive designs in China.

NOVA has trade showrooms at the Dallas Market Center in Dallas, TX; the World Market Center Las Vegas; the International Home Furnishings Center in High Point, NC; and an international showroom in Zhongshan, China.
