= Market Square (High Point, North Carolina) =

Historic building complex in North Carolina, US

- Tomlinson Chair Manufacturing Company Complex
- U.S. National Register of Historic Places
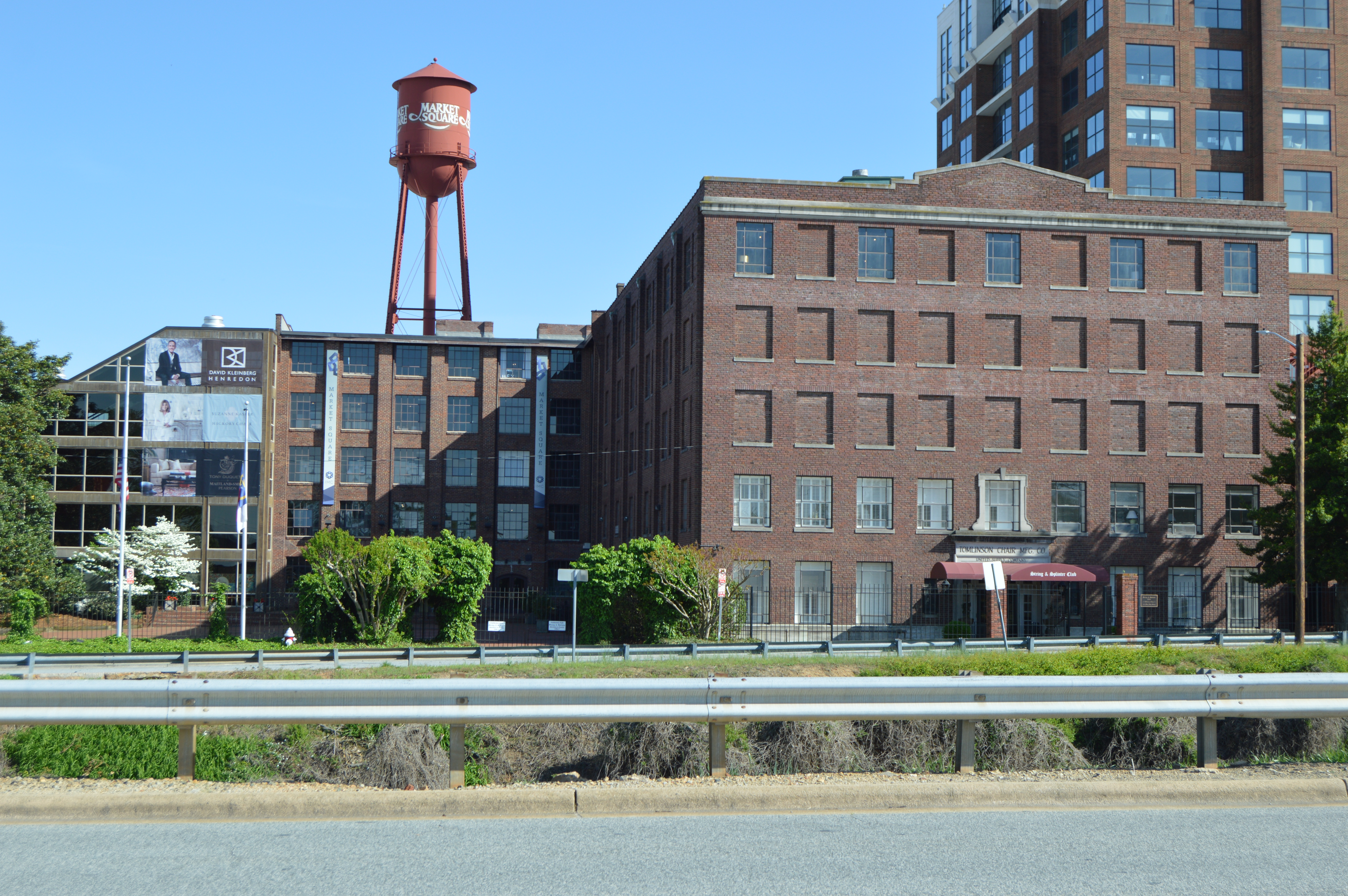
- Distant view from the north

- Location within North Carolina Location within the United States
- Location: 305 W. High St., High Point, North Carolina
- Coordinates: 35°57′18″N 80°0′33″W
- Area: 4 acres (1.6 ha)
- Built: 1902
- Architectural style: Italianate
- NRHP reference No.: 83001888
- Added to NRHP: March 17, 1983

Market Square is a furniture showroom complex in High Point, North Carolina, owned by International Market Centers which is the largest building in North Carolina on the National Register of Historic Places (NRHP), and the sixth largest in the United States. Known also as Tomlinson Chair Manufacturing Company Complex, it was listed on the NRHP under that name. The former manufacturing complex includes the oldest factory building in the city, and its renovation has been credited with making High Point a successful furniture exhibition center. A 16-story addition in 1990 is one of the city's tallest buildings.

== History of Tomlinson Chair ==
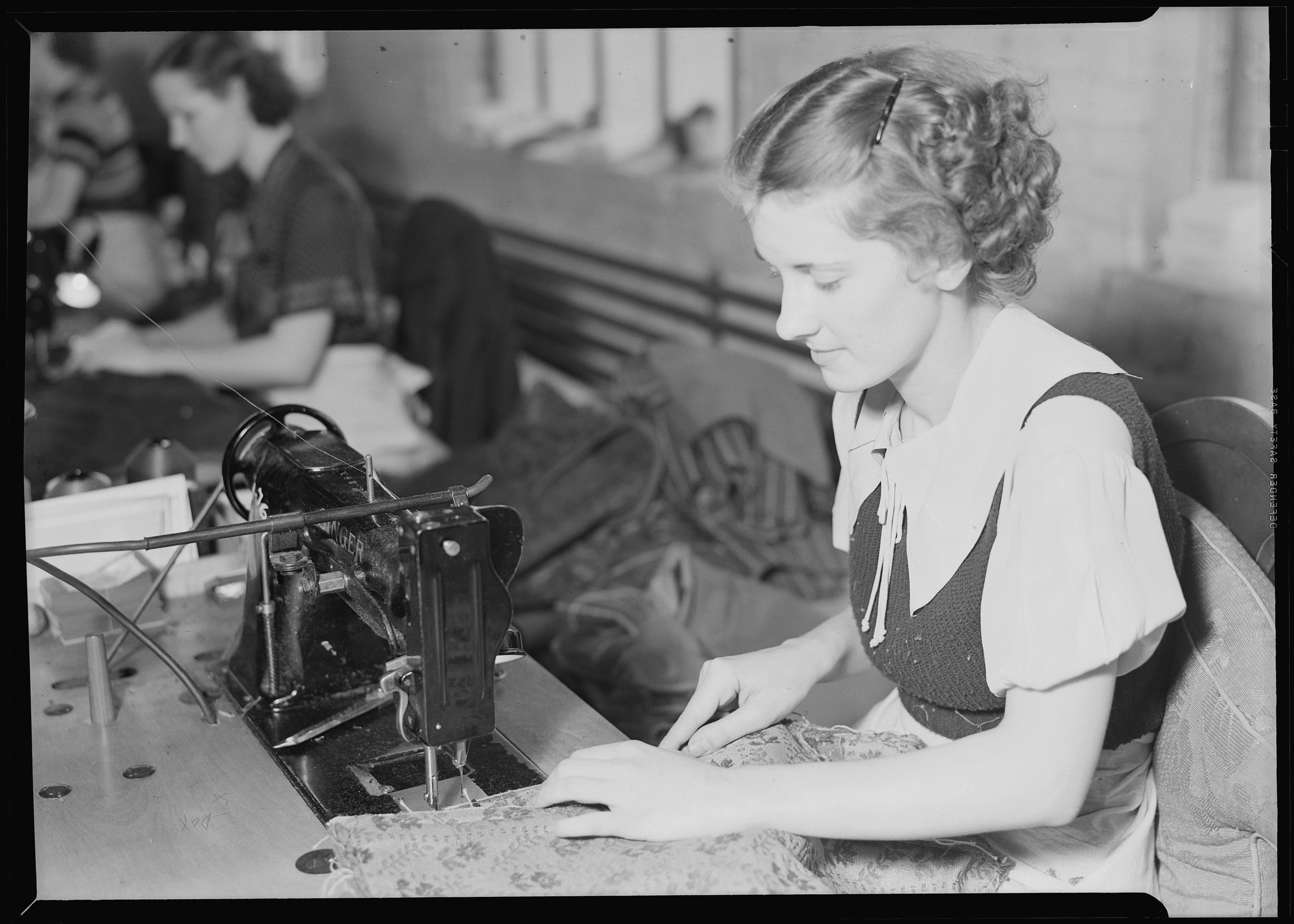
Tomlinson seamstress completing upholstery for a cushion (1937)

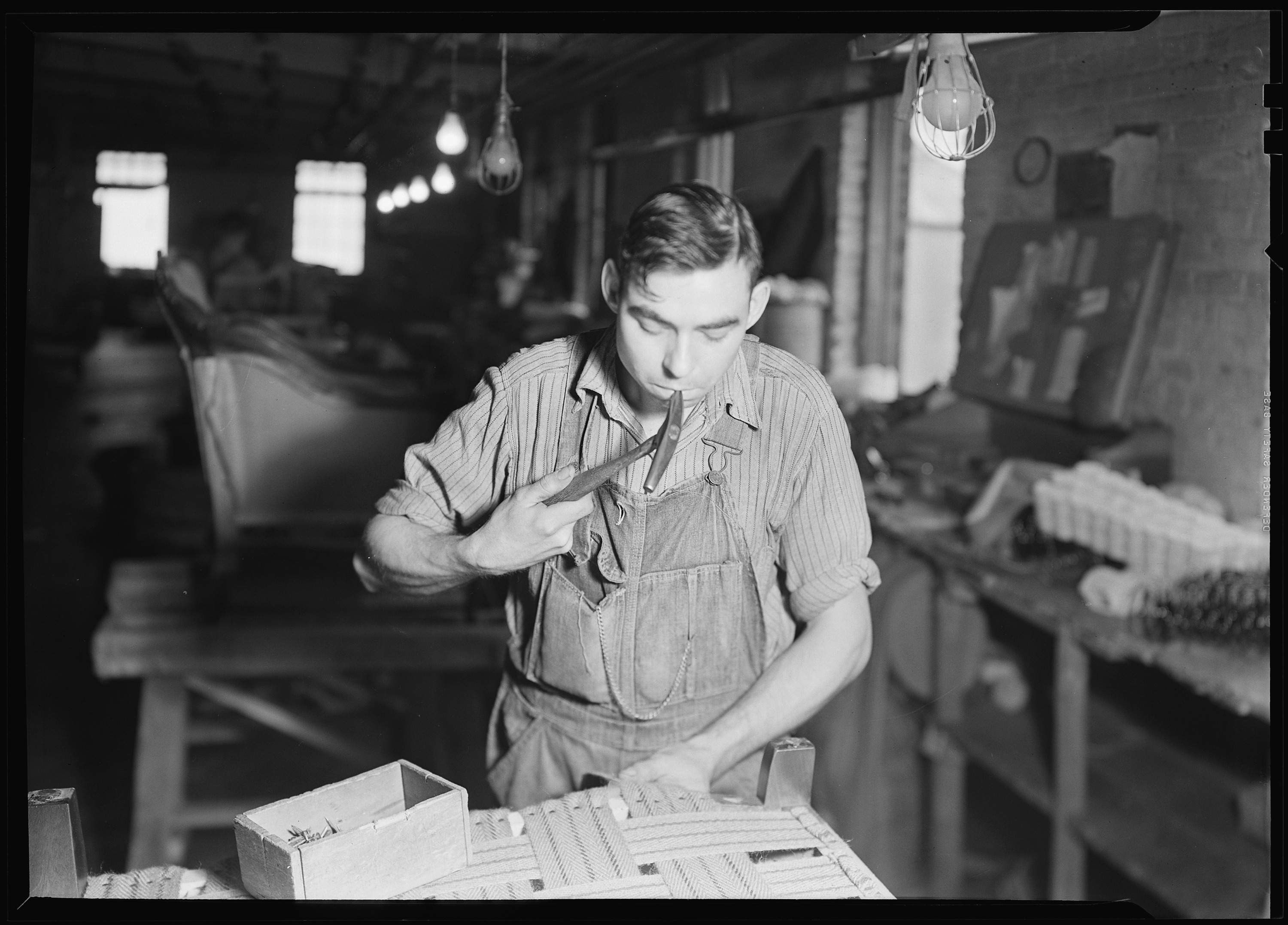
Applying webbing to a chair

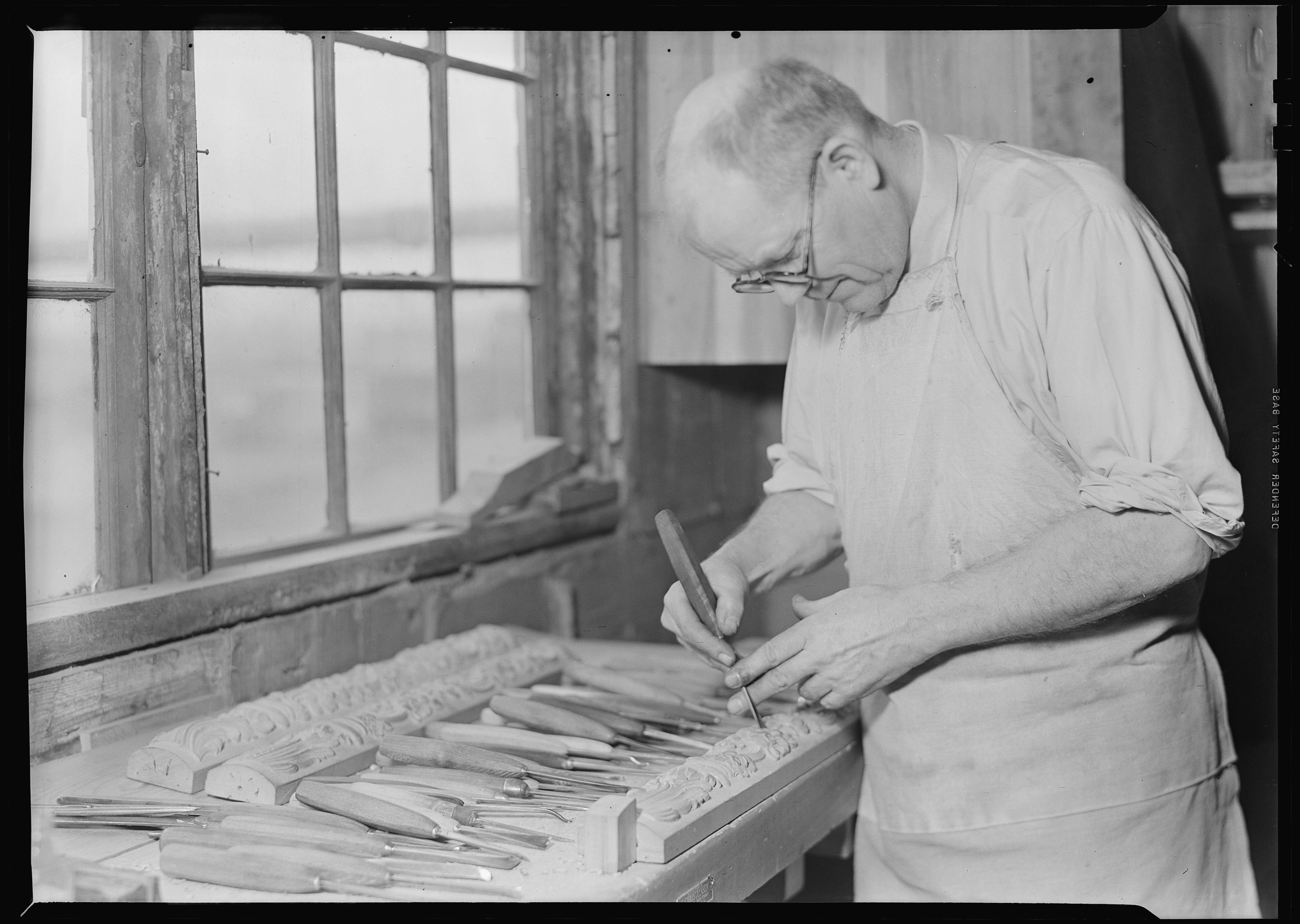
Master carver

Sidney Halstead Tomlinson Sr. started Tomlinson Chair Manufacturing Company in October 1900 in High Point, North Carolina, with 12 employees. The business was originally chartered under the name of Tomlinson of High Point, and operations started on January 1, 1901, with just 18,000 square feet of space its inaugural year. Sidney Tomlinson's brother Charles F. Tomlinson joined the company as secretary and treasurer in June 1904. The two brothers played major roles in starting the city's YMCA, chamber of commerce and library, and Emerywood Country Club. Tomlinson Chair was one of the first companies to make matching dining room suites. The company's styles included 19th Century French, English and American. Tomlinson was one of the first companies to show furniture in gallery style. According to a 1945 article in North Carolina's The State magazine, "In order to show [their] fine furniture to advantage, Tomlinsons devised displays in gallery form, thus originating a method which has affected the whole furniture industry, as display in galleries has developed into a center about which the manufacture and sales of distinctive furniture now resolve." High Point's success as a furniture manufacturing city was "due in large measure to the success and leadership of the Tomlinson Chair Manufacturing Company", which was "one of the nation's largest, most profitable and most innovative furniture factories." The term "Tomlinson Quality" was trademarked.

Members of the Lambeth family were among the founders of Standard Chair Company in Thomasville, North Carolina, in 1898; the plant was the oldest in town in 1990. James Erwin Lambeth and his wife Katherine Covington "K.C." Lambeth started Erwin-Lambeth. The company added a new plant in 1947. Rod Lambeth bought Tomlinson Chair in 1987 and Erwin-Lambeth in 1989.

In 2001, Tomlinson/Erwin-Lambeth, based in Thomasville, bought Directional Furniture. The companies were known for their "higher end" traditional furniture.

Prior to Fall 2005, when the company moved to its own building, Tomlinson/Erwin-Lambeth had its showroom in the complex where Tomlinson once made furniture.

Tomlinson/Erwin-Lambeth now makes upholstered furniture and occasional pieces.

== History of Market Square ==
The Tomlinson Chair Manufacturing Company Complex was built between 1900 and 1927, with another addition in 1946. It includes the oldest factory building still standing in High Point, built between 1902 and 1906. A group of five-story buildings built between 1902 and 1911 are described as "brick Italianate industrial buildings with large segmental door and window arches."

A five-story building built between 1924 and 1927 served as offices and showrooms and was later renovated for showrooms and a restaurant. Also part of the complex were a smokestack and water tower. The older buildings were still used for manufacturing until the 1970s.

In July 1981, a group of businessmen bought the 650,000-square-foot complex, with plans to turn it into a furniture showroom building. Market Square opened for the Spring 1982 Furniture Market. Jake Froelich, one of the owners, hoped furniture manufacturers would move their showrooms to the city. When Froelich died at 72 in 2003, a Greensboro News & Record editorial said, "His far-sighted notion to remake an aging factory into Market Square forever changed the face of the Furniture City."

The Tomlinson Chair Manufacturing Company Complex was named to the National Register of Historic Places in 1983 because it is "an intact example of the physical evolution of North Carolina furniture manufacturing plants during the first half of the 20th century." Features include "windows, its arched entrances, metal water tower, steel ceiling beams and wooden support beams." The nomination form said, "On both its interior and exterior, the Tomlinson Chair Manufacturing Co. complex provides a well-preserved example of the growth and development of the early 20th-century furniture manufacturing industry in North Carolina." The 1983 listing included two contributing buildings and one other contributing structure on 4 acres (1.6 ha).

The conversion of the Tomlinson complex has been given as a major reason for High Point's success as a furniture exhibition center.

In 1990, a 16-story $16 million addition to Market Square opened, with showrooms on the first five floors, nineteen condominiums on the top four floors, and office space in the middle.

In 1998, Merchandise Mart Properties, a subsidiary of Vornado Realty Trust, of New Jersey, bought Market Square for $100 million from George Lyles, S. Davis Phillips and Froelich, who remained as general manager. With 1.05 million square feet and plans for a 345,000-square-foot addition, Market Square was already High Point's second-largest showroom complex, with five restaurants, four exhibition areas, and walkways to a Holiday Inn and other showrooms. In December, the Guilford County Historic Preservation Commission agreed to allow the demolition of a drying kiln section built in 1946 in order to build the three-story addition on the West Commerce Street side, but the brick floor and handrail tracks would be preserved. So would a brick wall which was an exterior wall of the factory before the addition of the drying kiln. A brick facade in the new section would match the rest of the building. The Suites at Market Square opened in April 2000. As part of the expansion, a "nonworking replica" of a water tower was added which looked like the one used during the Tomlinson days, except with "The Suites at Market Square". The city objected, calling this a sign which violated city rules, but after negotiation, the city changed the rules to allow historic buildings to have signs.

In Spring 2010, Merchandise Mart Properties announced $1.5 million in renovations which included preserving the complex's history.

Also in 2010, the High Point holdings of Merchandise Mart Properties went into receivership. High Point Acquisition Co. bought the properties in 2011, including Market Square and National Furniture Mart, for $139.5 million. The deal represented 2.1 million square feet of space.

At a press conference on May 3, 2011, World Market Center CEO Bob Maricich and other officials of a new company announced the consolidation of what had been competing showroom facilities. International Market Centers (IMC), owned by Bain Capital and Oaktree Capital, with headquarters in both High Point and Las Vegas, bought the International Home Furnishings Center, Market Square and Showplace, representing about two-thirds of the city's 10 million square feet of showroom space.
