= Modway =

American furniture company

- Type: Private
- Industry: Furniture
- Founded: 2005; 21 years ago in Brooklyn, New York
- Founders: Tuvya Greisman; Moshe Melamed; Shneur Zalman Hirsch
- Headquarters: East Windsor, New Jersey, United States
- Website: modway.com

Modway is an American furniture company founded in Brooklyn, New York by Tuvya Greisman, Moshe Melamed, and Shneur Zalman Hirsch in 2005. It is currently headquartered in East Windsor, New Jersey.

== History ==
The bootstrapped company was founded out of founder Tuvya Greisman's parents' garage in 2005. Its early projects included refurbishing office chairs and manufacturing hand-made furniture products. Greisman hand-delivered furniture products to Manhattan during the company's early days.

In the summer of 2018, Modway introduced its Aura line of outdoor wicker rattan furniture at the summer Las Vegas Market. The following year, it debuted its performance velvet collection at its showroom in the Las Vegas Market's World Market Center. They also exhibited at the same show in 2021.

In 2022, Modway opened a warehouse and distribution center in Hesperia, California, which is located within the Hesperia Commerce Center One development. It previously had a warehouse in Fontana, California.

In 2025, the company exhibited its products at Las Vegas Market and the High Point Furniture Market in North Carolina.
