= Kissinger (disambiguation) =

Henry Kissinger (1923–2023) was an American diplomat.

Kissinger may also refer to:

== People ==
- Bill Kissinger (1871–1929), American Major League Baseball player
- C. Clark Kissinger (born 1940), American communist
- Jessica Kissinger, American biologist and geneticist
- Kakai Kissinger (born 1975), Kenyan human rights activist
- Meg Kissinger, American investigative journalist
- Nancy Kissinger (1934–2026), American philanthropist and wife of Henry Kissinger
- Kissinger Deng (born 1979), Norwegian ice sledge hockey player

== Other uses ==
- Kissinger, Missouri, U.S., an unincorporated community in Pike County
- Kissinger: A Biography, a 1992 book about Henry Kissinger by Walter Isaacson
- "Kissinger", full title "Please Note We Are No Longer Accepting Letters of Recommendation from Henry Kissinger", an episode of Law & Order: Criminal Intent, season 7
- Kissinger Prize for exceptional contributions in transatlantic relations
- Kissinger Associates, a New York City-based international geopolitics consultancy

== See also ==
- Kessinger (disambiguation)
