= Barry Dixon =

American Interior Designer

[[

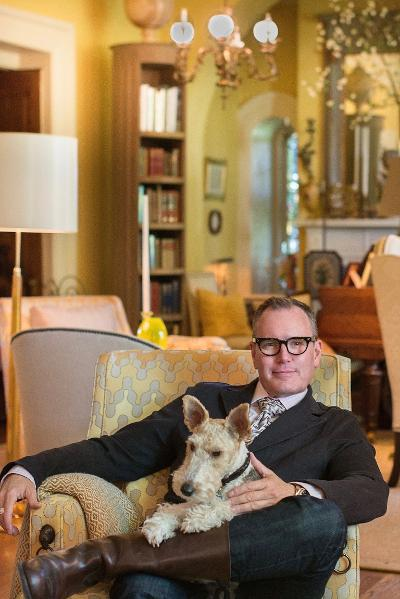
Barry Dixon

|thumb]]

Barry Darr Dixon (born 1959) is an American interior designer based in Warrenton, Virginia. He is the founder and president of Barry Dixon, Inc., formed in 1995, which specializes in high-end residential and commercial interiors. He is known for blending Southern style with global influences.

== Early life and education ==
Barry Dixon was born in 1959 in Memphis, Tennessee. His parents were both avid art collectors. His mother was a designer. His father's work as a metallurgist for an international company moved his family to exotic locales including India, Pakistan, Korea, New Caledonia and South Africa, where he graduated from high school. The global influences of his childhood travels are reflected in his design aesthetic. He earned a Bachelor of Fine Arts in Art History and Design from the University of Mississippi in 1982.

== Career ==
After graduating, Dixon lived in Jackson, Mississippi decorating antebellum homes. In 1984, he moved to Washington, DC and worked for designers Carol Lascaris and Bob Waldron.

Dixon founded his design firm, Barry Dixon, Inc. in 1995.

He has designed homes and showrooms around the globe including the home of Diane Sawyer, and the showroom of the Venice, Italy-based textile manufacturer, Fortuny. Other clients have included former Senate Majority Leader Bill Frist and financier and philanthropists Norma and Russ Ramsey. Dixon also designed Merrywood Estate, the childhood home of Jackie Kennedy, when he was hired by previous owner, AOL co-founder, Steve Case and his wife.

His work has been featured in magazines including Southern Home, Traditional Home, Elle Decor, Architectural Digest, House Beautiful, LUXE, and Southern Accents, which tapped him for its "Top Four Under Forty" list in 1995, and Veranda which named him 2010's Master of Design. He has also been featured in more than a dozen other publications, including: Farrow & Ball: The Art of Color, Fortuny Interiors, Interior Design Master Class, Designer at Home, The Gentleman's Farm, and Inspired By: Kathryn M Ireland. His designs were featured in Flower Magazine's Multi-Design Showhouse in September 2022 in Atlanta, Georgia's exclusive Buckhead neighborhood. In 2023, nineteen new pieces were added to Dixon's Arteriors Collection where they were shown at the largest trade show in North America, High Point Market in North Carolina in April 2023. This collection was also highlighted in Elle Decor's "Collab to Covet" feature in their April 2023 issue.

Dixon's television appearances include segments on Good Morning America, HGTV, and the Style Network.

He was one of the featured speakers on the Uncovering Beauty panel at the C.Next Designers event in Cancun, Mexico in February 2023.

He has designed interior collections for companies to include a furniture and upholstery line with Tomlinson; lighting, accessories, and furniture for Arteriors; fabrics, trims, and wallcoverings for Vervain; and The Natural Color Collection by Barry Dixon for C2 Paint.

Dixon's first book, Barry Dixon Interiors, written with Brian Coleman with photography by Edward Addeo was published in 2008. A second book, Barry Dixon Inspirations, also written with Coleman and with photography by Erik Kvalsvik, was published in 2011.

== Personal life ==
Michael Schmidt (1965–2010) was Dixon's life and business partner for over 20 years until his death.

His current partner is TTR Sotheby's International Realty Vice President and Philanthropist Will Thomas, a former journalist with Fox 5 News in Washington, DC. Thomas serves on the board of the Northern Virginia Therapeutic Riding Program which serves children with special needs and wounded service members among others.

=== Elway Hall ===
Dixon lives and works in his 1907 Edwardian estate, Elway Hall, located on 270 acres of farmland in Fauquier County, Virginia's horse country. The nearly 20,000 sq. ft. estate features 10 bedrooms and 17 fireplaces. Dixon is the fourth resident in the estate's history. Here he has raised goats, llamas, and hens, kept horses and bees, and tended an orchard as well as vegetable and flower gardens. The home was originally built as a wedding gift from industrialist and West Virginia senator Johnson Newlon Camden to his daughter Annie.
