= Bill Jordan (outdoorsman) =

American businessman and television host

Bill Jordan is the creator of the Realtree and Advantage brands of camouflage and the host of the Monster Bucks video series and the Realtree Outdoors television show. He has made numerous appearances on outdoor television shows and has produced and assisted many up and coming leaders in the hunting industry. His slogan for Realtree being "Family, Friends and the Outdoors" signifying the importance of hunting and fishing in communities across the United States.

== Biography ==
Jordan grew up in a rural home outside of Columbus, Georgia where he was the youngest of three siblings. Jordan's father, Leon, owned a boat dealership close to Lake Oliver.

Jordan went to Columbus High School where he was a star athlete in track, basketball, and football. He received a scholarship from the University of Mississippi for football. Ole Miss appealed to him the most because good hunting and fishing was a short drive away. Jordan graduated from college in 1973, but injuries kept him from going pro.

== Camouflage business ==
In 1986 Jordan decided to design his own camouflage patterns, and did so by trying to mock the bark from a giant oak tree in his parents' front lawn. His breakthrough came at a SHOT Show where his new camouflage patterns were recognized by well-known figures in the hunting industry. They all wanted to know if he could send them a shipment of his products but Jordan had no money or real licensing agreement. The men from these well-known hunting companies and Jordan sat in his booth for hours trying to figure out how to begin producing his camouflage patterns. Finally they worked out an agreement with Walls and Jordan's textile industry that he used. Jordan changed the name of his company, signed an agreement, and Realtree was born.
