= Grae Kessinger =

American baseball player (born 1997)

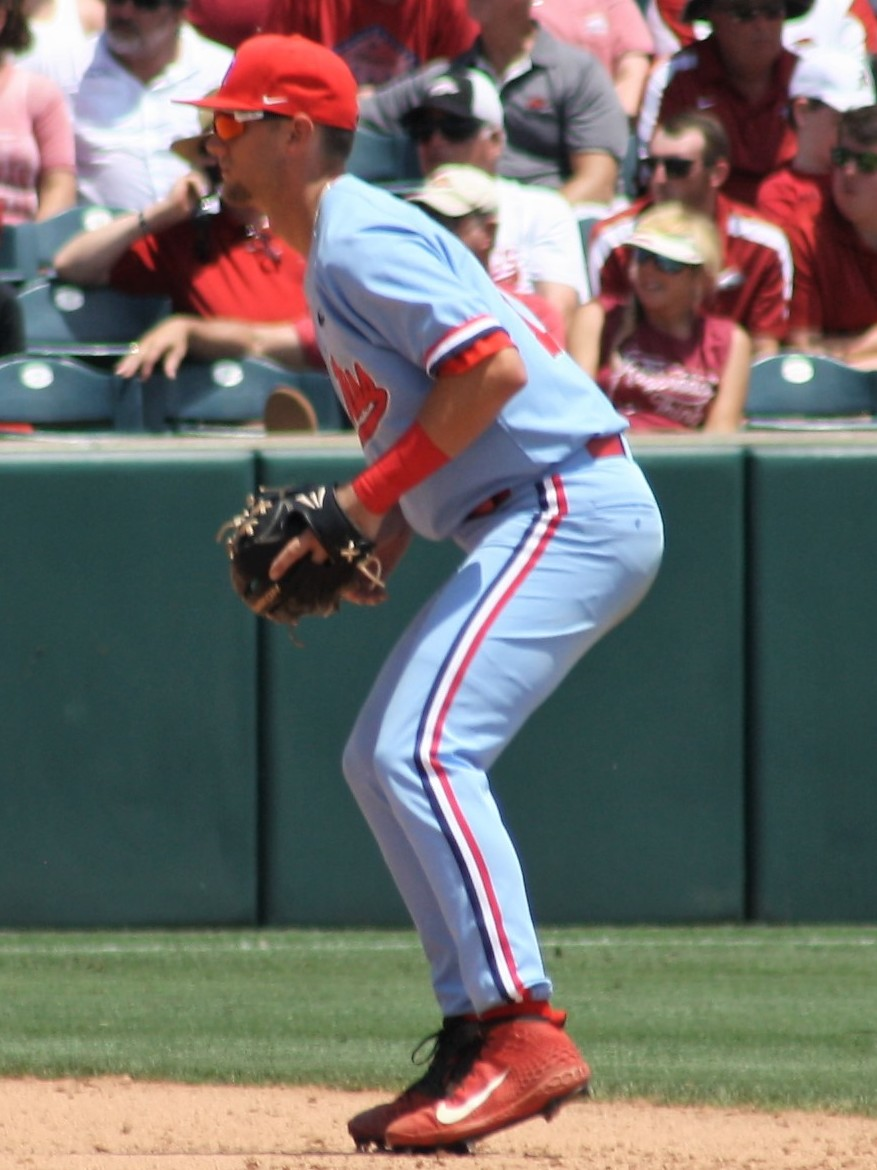
- Kessinger with the Ole Miss Rebels

Free agent
- Infielder
- Born: August 25, 1997 (age 29); Oxford, Mississippi, U.S.
- Bats: Right Throws: Right

MLB debut
- June 7, 2023, for the Houston Astros

MLB statistics (through 2024 season)
- Batting average: .131
- Home runs: 1
- Runs batted in: 1
- Stats at Baseball Reference

Teams
- Houston Astros (2023–2024)

Graeber Crawley Kessinger (born August 25, 1997) is an American professional baseball infielder who is a free agent. He has previously played in Major League Baseball (MLB) for the Houston Astros. He made his MLB debut in 2023.

== Amateur career ==
Kessinger attended Oxford High School in Oxford, Mississippi. He was drafted out of high school in the 2016 MLB draft, going in the 26th round to the San Diego Padres, but did not sign with the Padres, instead choosing to attend the University of Mississippi to play college baseball for the Ole Miss Rebels.

As a freshman at Ole Miss in 2017, Kessinger batted only .175 with two home runs and 16 runs batted in (RBIs). In his sophomore year at Ole Miss, Kessinger improved to hit .300 with eight home runs and 37 RBIs. After the 2018 season, he briefly played collegiate summer baseball with the Bourne Braves of the Cape Cod Baseball League. In Kessinger's junior and final year at Ole Miss, he hit .330 with seven home runs and 50 RBIs. In his junior year at Ole Miss he was named First Team All-SEC shortstop, a Third Team All-American by Collegiate Baseball, and named to ABCA All-South Region First Team. He won the Brooks Wallace Award, given annually to the nation's top shortstop.

== Professional career ==
=== Houston Astros ===
The Houston Astros selected Kessinger in the second round of the 2019 Major League Baseball (MLB) draft. He made his minor league debut with the Low–A Tri-City ValleyCats on June 20, 2019, where he saw his first professional hit, a two-out double in the 6th inning, in that initial game. Kessinger was called up to Single–A on July 4, to play for the Quad Cities River Bandits. He did not play in a game in 2020 due to the cancellation of the minor league season because of the COVID-19 pandemic.

Kessinger returned to action in 2021 with the Double-A Corpus Christi Hooks. Across 86 games, he slashed .209/.287/.330 with 9 home runs, 26 RBI, and 12 stolen bases. For the 2022 season, Kessinger remained with Corpus Christi, playing in 121 games and batting .211/.327/.366 with career-highs in home runs (16), RBI (58), and stolen bases (23).

Kessinger began the 2023 season with the Triple-A Sugar Land Space Cowboys, playing in 52 games and hitting .284/.400/.443 with 6 home runs and 32 RBI. On June 5, 2023, Kessinger was selected to the 40-man roster and promoted to the major leagues for the first time. The promotion was made with the intention for Kessinger to fill in for Jose Altuve, who was dealing with an oblique issue. He made his debut on June 7, against the Toronto Blue Jays at the Rogers Centre, playing third base and hitting ninth. Kessinger hit his first career home run, accounting for his first career run batted in, on July 4, off Kyle Freeland of the Colorado Rockies at Minute Maid Park. Kessinger joined his grandfather, Don, and uncle, Keith, as the third generation of his family to hit a home run in Major League Baseball. In 26 games during his rookie campaign, Kessinger batted .200/.289/.325 with one home run and one RBI.

Kessinger made 22 appearances for Houston in 2024, going 0–for–21 with 3 walks. He was designated for assignment by the Astros following the signing of Christian Walker on December 23, 2024.

=== Arizona Diamondbacks ===
On January 7, 2025, the Astros traded Kessinger to the Arizona Diamondbacks in exchange for minor league pitcher Matthew Linskey. He was optioned to the Triple-A Reno Aces to begin the season. In 11 games for Reno, Kessinger batted .235/.447/.324 with three RBI and one stolen base. On April 19, he was designated for assignment by the Diamondbacks. Kessinger was released by Arizona the following day.

=== New York Mets ===
On January 27, 2026, Kessinger signed a minor league contract with the New York Mets. On March 1, manager Carlos Mendoza announced that Kessinger would miss roughly 8-to-12 weeks after suffering a "significant” hamstring injury. After completing a rehab assignment with the rookie-level Florida Complex League Mets and High-A Brooklyn Cyclones, he was assigned to the Triple-A Syracuse Mets. Kessinger played in 17 games for Syracuse and hit .242 with one home run and 12 RBI before he was released by the Mets on July 4.

=== Pittsburgh Pirates ===
On July 8, 2026, Kessinger signed a minor league contract with the Pittsburgh Pirates. In 30 games with Triple-A Indianapolis Indians he batted .094/.198/.118 with no home runs, 2 RBIs and 2 stolen bases. He elected free agency on November 2.

== Personal life ==
Kessinger's grandfather, Don, is a former six-time All-Star and two-time Gold Glove shortstop over 16 major league seasons, predominantly for the Chicago Cubs, former major league manager, and former head coach for Ole Miss. His uncle, Keith, appeared in 11 games at shortstop for the Cincinnati Reds in 1993 and coached in college baseball. His father, Kevin, was drafted by the Cubs, but retired from professional baseball due to injury before playing in the major leagues. Each of the four Kessingers played baseball for Ole Miss.

== See also ==
- List of third-generation Major League Baseball players
- List of University of Mississippi alumni
