= Don Kessinger =

American baseball player and manager (born 1942)

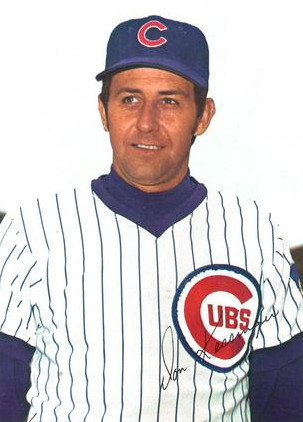
- Kessinger in 1973
- Shortstop / Manager
- Born: July 17, 1942 (age 84); Forrest City, Arkansas, U.S.
- Batted: Switch Threw: Right

MLB debut
- September 7, 1964, for the Chicago Cubs

Last MLB appearance
- July 31, 1979, for the Chicago White Sox

MLB statistics
- Batting average: .252
- Home runs: 14
- Runs batted in: 527
- Managerial record: 46–60
- Winning %: .434
- Stats at Baseball Reference
- Managerial record at Baseball Reference

Teams
- As player: Chicago Cubs (1964–1975); St. Louis Cardinals (1976–1977); Chicago White Sox (1977–1979); As manager: Chicago White Sox (1979)

Career highlights and awards
- 6× All-Star (1968–1972, 1974); 2× Gold Glove Award (1969, 1970); Chicago Cubs Hall of Fame

Donald Eulon Kessinger (/ˈkɛsɪndʒər/ KES-in-jər; born July 17, 1942) is an American former professional baseball player and manager. He played in Major League Baseball as a shortstop from 1964 to 1979, most prominently as a member of the Chicago Cubs, where he was a six-time All-Star and two-time Gold Glove Award winner. He ended his career playing for the St. Louis Cardinals and the Chicago White Sox.

In the late 1960s and early 1970s, Kessinger was considered one of the best shortstops in baseball. For nine consecutive seasons he formed a productive middle-infield partnership with second baseman Glenn Beckert. He is also notable for being the last player-manager in American League history.

== Baseball career ==
A four sport All-State and All-America athlete for the Forrest City High School Mustangs, Kessinger graduated high school in 1960 and went on to the University of Mississippi. During his collegiate years, he earned All-Conference, All-SEC, and All-America honors in both basketball and baseball for the Rebels, and was initiated into the Sigma Nu fraternity. Kessinger also played for the Peoria Pacers, of the Central Illinois Collegiate League (a summer league for collegiate players) in its founding year, 1963. He was signed by the Chicago Cubs as an amateur free agent on June 19, 1964. Kessinger was assigned to play for the Double-A Fort Worth Cats before making his major league debut on September 7, 1964.

He returned to the minor leagues with the Dallas-Fort Worth Spurs for the 1965 season, but was brought back by the Cubs in June of that year and became their starting shortstop. The 1965 season would mark the first of nine consecutive seasons in which Kessinger would work alongside Cubs' second baseman Glenn Beckert. He ended the season hitting for a .201 batting average and led the National League shortstops in errors but, showed some promise by leading the league in range factor.

As the 1966 season got underway, Kessinger continued to struggle with his hitting when, new Cubs manager Leo Durocher encouraged him to become a switch hitter. With the help of coach Pete Reiser, his hitting began to improve, in posting a .304 batting average during the second half of the season. Durocher made Kessinger his lead off hitter, a spot he would hold for many years. He ended the year with a career-high .274 batting average and led the league's shortstops with 474 assists.

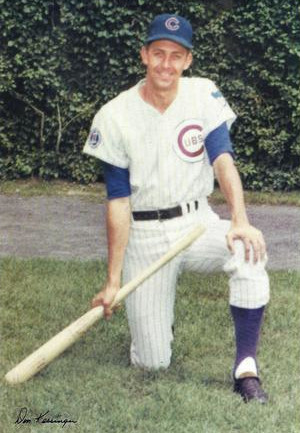
Kessinger in 1969

Kessinger continued to improve his fielding and in 1968, he was recognized as one of the top shortstops in the league when he was voted to be the starting shortstop for the National League in the 1968 All-Star Game. At the end of the season, he ranked first among the league's shortstops in range factor and, led the entire league in assists. While he also led the league in errors, he attributed this to the fact that he reached more ground balls than the average shortstop.

Kessinger repeated as an All-Star in 1969, in a year which saw the entire Chicago Cubs infield join him on the 1969 All-Star team, with Kessinger and Cubs' third baseman Ron Santo in the starting line-up. In 1969, he set a major league single-season record for shortstops by playing in 54 games without committing an error, breaking the record previously set by Chico Carrasquel in 1951. The Cubs were in first place in the National League Eastern Division for 180 days of the 1969 season, before going 8–17 in their final 25 games, while the New York "Miracle" Mets went 37–11 in their final 48 games to clinch the Eastern Division pennant. Despite the Cubs' late-season collapse, Kessinger scored 109 runs, hit for a .273 batting average with a career-high 181 hits, including 38 doubles; second-most in the league. He led the league's shortstops in putouts, finished second in fielding percentage and once again led the entire National League in assists. He finished in 15th place in balloting for the 1969 National League Most Valuable Player Award and won his first Gold Glove Award. In his book, The Bill James Historical Baseball Abstract, baseball historian Bill James cited manager Durocher's method of using his regular players everyday without any rest days as a factor in the Cubs' collapse. On September 9, 1969, Kessinger was in the batters box at Shea Stadium when a black cat emerged from under the stands. After staring at Kessinger and Santo (in the on-deck circle), it headed toward the Cubs' bench, where Durocher received a raised tail and hiss.

During a July 4 interview in 1969 with then St. Louis Cardinals sportscaster Harry Caray, Cubs pitcher, Ferguson Jenkins, gave a name to Kessinger's trademark play at shortstop—"The Down Pat". Children from throughout WGN-TV's viewing audience widely copied it on playgrounds and in Little League games, and his fellow players typically stood in awe. Carey noted that Kessinger would regularly go to his right, toward left field, spear the ground ball and then, demonstrating a unique agility, reverse while in the air as he whipped the ball toward first base. "Do you think it might be because Don was a great basketball player?" asked Caray. Without hesitation, Jenkins responded, "In the past five games he's made many great plays to his right. Don has this play down pat."

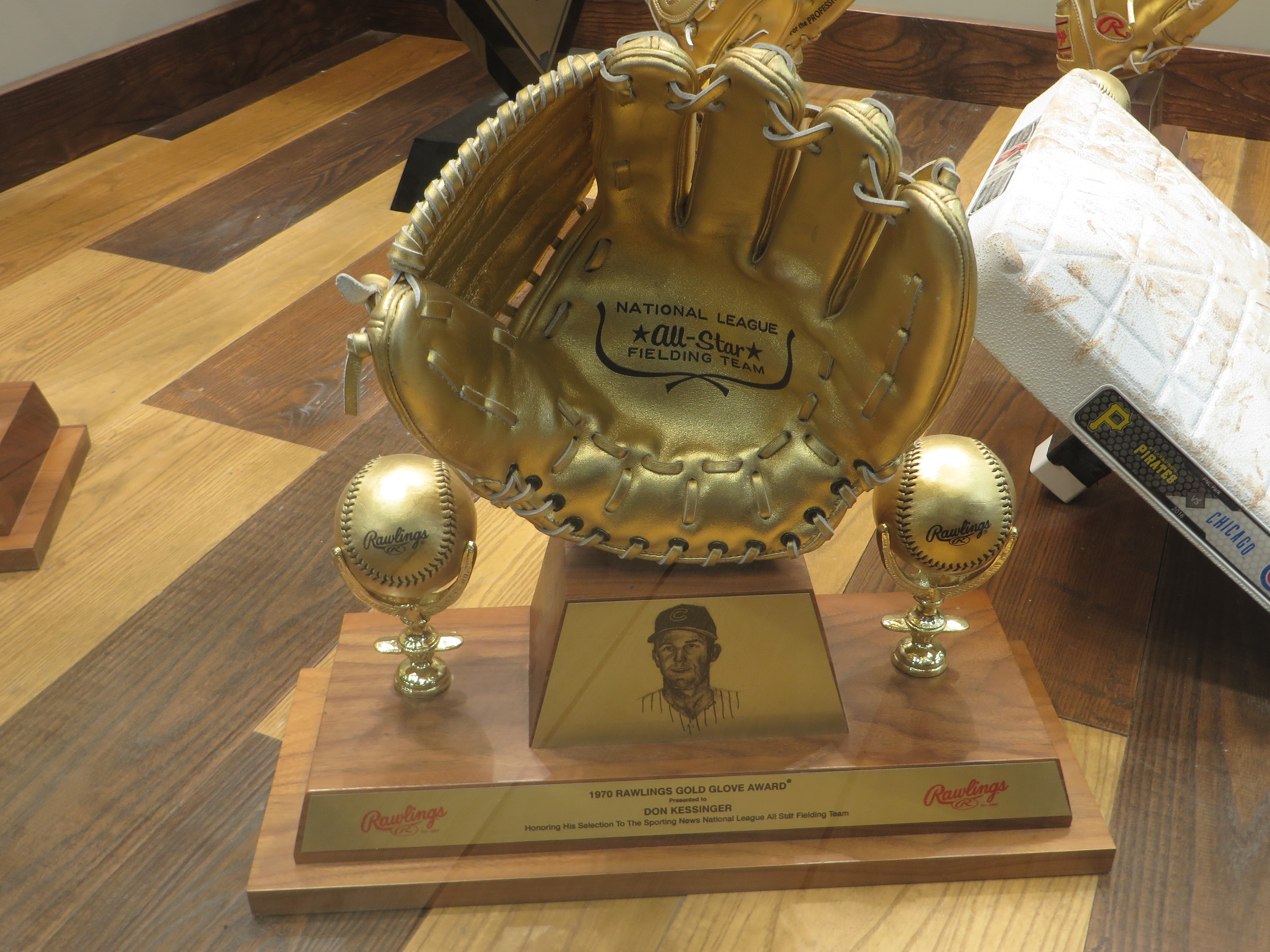
1970 Gold Glove Award trophy, received by Kessinger

Kessinger had another successful season in 1970, producing a .266 batting average while scoring 100 runs. He led the entire league in assists for the third consecutive year and claimed his second Gold Glove Award. On June 17, 1971, he went 6-for-6, becoming the first Cubs with a six hit game in nearly 34 years. He continued to be one of the cornerstones of the Cubs' infield, earning three more All-Star berths in 1971, 1972 and 1974. In October 1975, after 11 seasons with the Cubs, Kessinger was traded to the St. Louis Cardinals—for pitcher Mike Garman and infielder Bobby Hrapmann. He was the last remaining Cub from the 1969 season when they almost won the pennant.

The 33-year-old Kessinger still played well in St. Louis, ending the season with a .320 on-base percentage and was second in the league in range factor. In August 1977, he was traded to the Chicago White Sox—for pitcher Steve Staniland—who were seeking to bolster their infield strength. The White Sox held a "Don Kessinger Night" on September 8, 1978, where 31,000 Chicago baseball fans (said to consist, in Baseball Digest, of nearly equal numbers of Sox and Cubs fans) thanked #11 for his years of service at shortstop. On October 19, 1978, White Sox President Bill Veeck named Kessinger to be the team's player-manager (the last in AL history). He was managing at Comiskey Park on July 12, 1979, when the infamous "Disco Demolition Night" took place, and wisely locked his players in the locker room between games, avoiding the near-riot. With the White Sox languishing in 5th place in the standings, Kessinger resigned on August 2, 1979 and was replaced by Tony La Russa.

== Managerial record ==
Team	Year	Regular season					Postseason			
Team	Year	Games	Won	Lost	Win %	Finish	Won	Lost	Win %	Result
CWS	1979	106	46	60	.434	resigned	–	–	–	–
Total		106	46	60	.434		0	0	–	

== Career statistics ==
In a 16-year major league career, Kessinger played in 2,078 games, accumulating 1,931 hits in 7,651 at bats for a .252 career batting average along with 14 home runs, 527 runs batted in and an on-base percentage of .314. His 14 home runs is the fewest for all players with at least 2,000 games played in MLB history. Kessinger however struggled as a pinch-hitter in his MLB career, going 0-for-37 with just one RBI. He retired with a .965 fielding percentage. A six-time All-Star, Kessinger won the National League Gold Glove for shortstops in 1969 and 1970. In three different seasons with the Cubs, he turned 100 or more double plays. Kessinger had 6,212 assists during his career, ranking him 14th all-time among major league shortstops. In 1977 he was named the recipient of the Danny Thomas Memorial Award, for his exemplary Christian Spirit in Major League Baseball and, the following year he was the recipient of the Lou Gehrig Memorial Award, presented annually to the Major League baseball player who both on and off the field best exemplifies the character of Lou Gehrig. Kessinger received 0.5% of the vote on the Baseball Hall of Fame balloting, 1985, his only appearance on the balloting.

== Personal life ==
Kessinger married Carolyn Crawley—also from Forrest City—in 1965. One son, Keith, was drafted by the Baltimore Orioles in 1989 and had a brief career (nine years, minors and majors, in the Reds and Cubs organizations) as a professional baseball player. Another son, Kevin, was drafted by the Chicago Cubs in 1992.

Prior to the 1991 season, Kessinger was hired as the head baseball coach at his alma mater, the University of Mississippi. Kessinger would spend six years as the Ole Miss skipper, leading the Rebels to four 30-win seasons. His 1995 team produced a school record for wins, going 40–22 and earning the school's first NCAA Regional bid since 1977. Ole Miss finished on the verge of its first College World Series appearance since 1972, placing second at the NCAA Atlantic I Regional behind host Florida State. Both of his sons had the opportunity to play for their father at Ole Miss. Following the 1996 season, Kessinger resigned his head coaching position to become Mississippi's associate athletics director for internal affairs, while concurrently serving as chair of the NCAA Baseball Rules Committee. He finished with a six-year record of 185–153.

Kessinger was an honoree at the 1976 Chicago Baseball Writers Diamond Dinner, where he was presented with the Ken Hubbs Award, given for exemplary conduct both on and off the field. He has also honored by the Chicagoland Sports Hall of Fame, Chicago Cubs Hall of Fame, Wrigley Field Walk of Fame, Ole Miss Sports Hall of Fame, Mississippi Sports Hall of Fame, National High School Hall of Fame and the Arkansas Sports Hall of Fame. He was also recognized as the 12th Best Athlete in the history of the Southeastern Conference in 2007 and named to the Ole Miss All-Century Basketball Team in 2008. Presently, he is the President of Kessinger Enterprises, Inc. and owns a real estate business in Oxford, Mississippi.

While writing his 2012 novel Calico Joe—detailing a fictional young player on the Cubs in the early 1970s—author John Grisham drew from Kessinger's memories. "But Grisham gets the baseball right – among the people he consulted while writing the book was Don Kessinger, a longtime friend who was the Cubs' slick-fielding shortstop in the period the flashback portion covers."

Kessinger's grandson, Grae, also became a professional baseball player who made his major league debut for the Houston Astros in 2023.

== See also ==
- Chicago Cubs award winners and league leaders
- List of Major League Baseball career assists leaders
- List of Major League Baseball career double plays as a shortstop leaders
- List of Major League Baseball career fielding errors as a shortstop leaders
- List of Major League Baseball career putouts as a shortstop leaders
- List of Major League Baseball player-managers
- List of Major League Baseball single-game hits leaders
- List of second-generation Major League Baseball players
- List of University of Mississippi alumni
