= Keith Kessinger =

American baseball player (born 1967)

- Infielder
- Born: February 19, 1967 (age 59); Forrest City, Arkansas, U.S.
- Batted: Right Threw: Right

MLB debut
- September 15, 1993, for the Cincinnati Reds

Last MLB appearance
- October 3, 1993, for the Cincinnati Reds

MLB statistics
- Games played: 11
- Batting average: .259
- Runs scored: 4
- Stats at Baseball Reference

Teams
- Cincinnati Reds (1993)

Robert Keith Kessinger (born February 19, 1967) is an American former Major League Baseball player who played as a shortstop in 11 games for the Cincinnati Reds in 1993.

He had been originally drafted by the Baltimore Orioles in the 36th round of the 1989 amateur draft, then the Reds purchased his contract in 1991.

His ML debut came on September 15, 1993 against the Atlanta Braves, where Kessinger went 1 for 2 in that initial game.

Kessinger was the head baseball coach at Arkansas State University from July 2002 to June 2008, compiling an overall 148–178 record. He spent two years prior to that as head coach at Carson–Newman College where he compiled a 66–47 record. He also served as an assistant baseball coach at the University of Mississippi for four seasons, where he had previously been a second-team All SEC shortstop.

Keith Kessinger's father, Don, is a former six-time All-Star and two-time Gold Glove winning shortstop over 16 major league seasons, predominantly for the Chicago Cubs, former major league manager, and head coach at Ole Miss.

His brother, Kevin, was drafted by the Cubs, although retired from professional baseball due to injury before playing in the major leagues.

His nephew, Grae, also became a professional baseball player who made his major league debut for the Houston Astros in 2023.

Each of the four Kessingers played baseball for Ole Miss.

== See also ==
- List of second generation MLB players
- List of University of Mississippi alumni

== Career statistics ==
G	AB	R	H	HR	RBI	AVG
11	27	4	7	1	3	.259
