= World Market Center Las Vegas =

Convention center and wholesale market in Las Vegas

Coordinates: 36.170447°N 115.155194°W

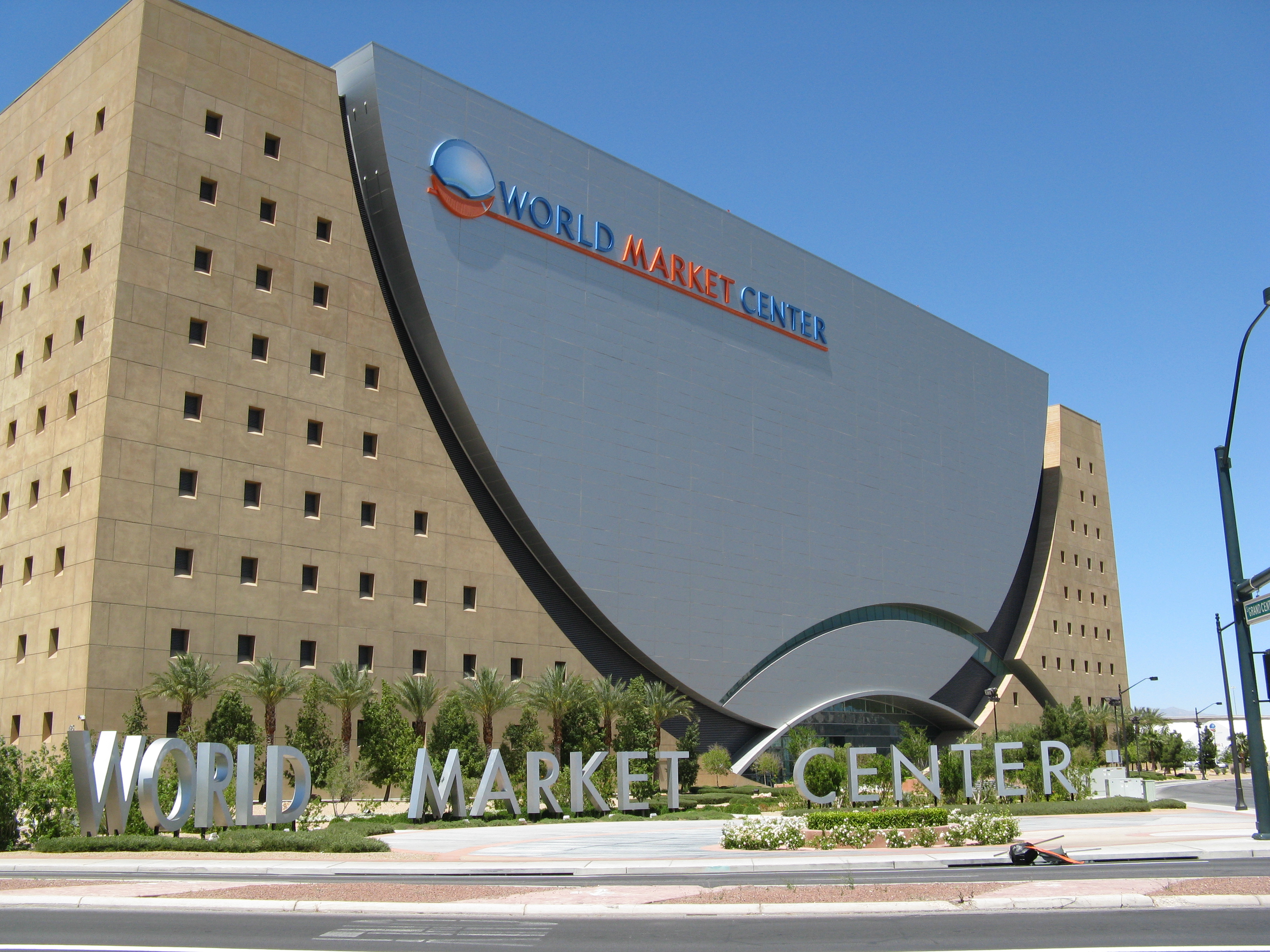
- Building A at World Market Center

General information
- Location: Downtown Las Vegas, Nevada, 495 Grand Central Parkway, United States
- Opened: July 25, 2005 (Building A); January 29, 2007 (Building B); July 28, 2008 (Building C); April 9, 2021 (Expo)
- Owner: International Market Centers

Technical details
- Floor count: 10 (Building A); 16 (buildings B and C)
- Floor area: 5.3 million square feet (490,000 m^{2}) (including all buildings)

Design and construction
- Architecture firm: Jerde Partnership International; JMA Architecture
- Main contractor: The Whiting-Turner Contracting Company (buildings A and B); Penta Building Group (Building C)

Website
- www.wmclv.com

World Market Center Las Vegas (Note: In 2007, retailer Cost Plus World Market filed a trademark infringement suit against the World Market Center. A settlement was reached in 2008, with the latter renamed World Market Center Las Vegas.) is a furniture showroom complex in downtown Las Vegas, Nevada, serving domestic and international sellers and buyers. It contains 5.3 million square feet (490,000 m^{2}) across four buildings, part of a 57-acre (23 ha) site. The project was proposed in 2001, and the first building opened on July 25, 2005. Subsequent additions opened in January 2007, July 2008, and April 2021.

== History ==
The World Market Center was conceived by Shawn Samson and Jack Kashani, both of Los Angeles-based Furniture Mart Enterprises. Las Vegas mayor Oscar Goodman met with the company in 2000 to discuss its plans for a wholesale furniture center in downtown Las Vegas. It was originally proposed as a 5 million sq ft (0.46 million m^{2}) project. It would be built on 57 acres (23 ha), located beside Interstate 15. The land, owned by Union Pacific Railroad, had been for sale since 1992. Speaking of any proposed project for the site, Goodman said, "I want people when they're driving by it on the freeway to say they've never seen anything like it."

The project, known as the World Market Center, was officially unveiled in February 2001. The land purchase was finalized that year, and the proposed project was expanded to 7.5 million sq ft (0.70 million m^{2}). At that time, it was planned as a 10-building complex, with the added 2.5 million sq ft (0.23 million m^{2}) consisting of hotel, residential and office space. The project was to be constructed in three phases, with completion expected in 2010. Goodman and Furniture Mart Enterprises believed that the project would establish Las Vegas as the furniture capital of the world. Although San Francisco and High Point, North Carolina were known for their furniture industries, Las Vegas was viewed as a superior city for its abundance of hotel rooms, as well as its popularity as a convention city.

The World Market Center sought a $115 million property tax rebate, although the Las Vegas Redevelopment Agency recommended against this, as it would drain the agency of funding for future projects. The city denied the request in 2001, but approved a $40 million rebate the following year, after lengthy negotiations. The Related Companies also provided financing.

Furniture Mart Enterprises broke ground on the project on March 21, 2003, with The Whiting-Turner Contracting Company as general contractor. It was set to open in 2004, although this was pushed back due to permitting issues. The foundation for the first structure, Building A, was eventually poured in January 2004. It was fully leased more than a year prior to its opening, signing on 230 tenants.

The World Market Center opened on July 25, 2005, with Building A hosting the Las Vegas Market show as its first event. The twice-annual Las Vegas Market brought an estimated 62,000 people during its first two shows. The World Market Center's early success had a negative impact on the San Francisco Mart, while High Point remained a viable competitor. The World Market Center also led to renewed interest in downtown redevelopment.

2005 artist rendering of the planned eight-building complex

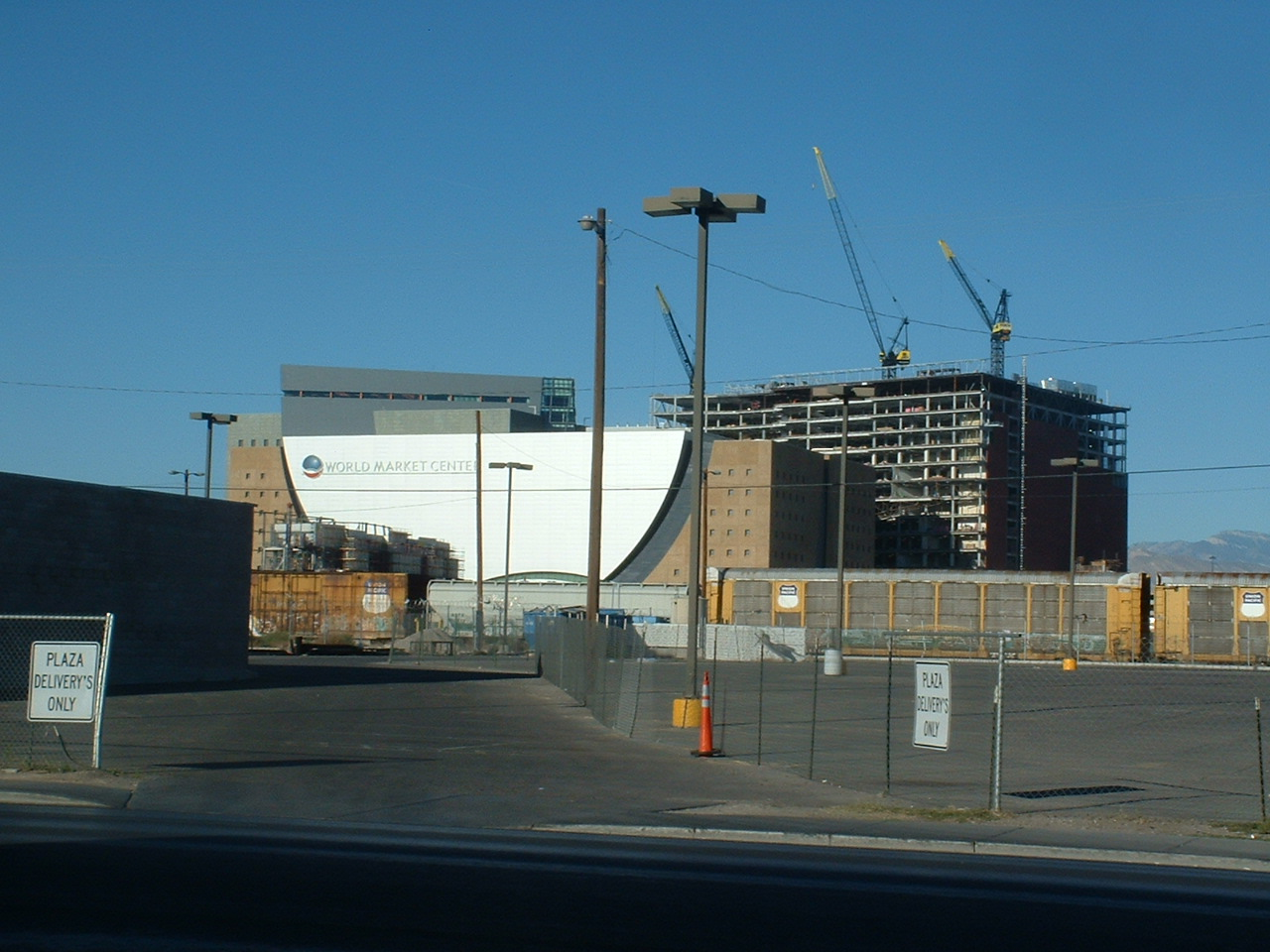
Construction of Building C, November 2007

New expansion plans for the market were announced several months prior to its opening, the final goal being a $2 billion, eight-building complex featuring 12 million square feet (1,100,000 m^{2}), with completion expected by 2015. These plans never fully materialized, although two more buildings would be added within a few years of the initial opening. Whiting-Turner returned as the contractor for Building B, which opened on January 29, 2007. Building C was constructed by the Penta Building Group. It was topped off in October 2007, and opened on July 28, 2008. During its first three years, the center attracted an estimated 300,000 people.

Plans for future buildings were shelved in 2008, amid concerns about the Great Recession; these also prompted the World Market Center to diversify itself beyond furniture, expanding to cover the home accent and gift markets. Occupancy and sales at the World Market Center dropped because of the recession, and the center defaulted on mortgages covering two of its buildings. As a result of the recession and financial problems, ownership of the World Market Center was merged with its rivals in High Point, forming the new company International Market Centers (IMC) in 2011. Blackstone Group later partnered with Fireside Investments to purchase IMC, a deal that was completed on September 26, 2017.

The closure of Cashman Center in 2017 left downtown Las Vegas with only 106,000 sq ft (9,800 m^{2}) of convention space, spread across 10 different resorts. In 2018, IMC proposed an addition to the World Market Center that would add to downtown's convention space. The city approved the project and contributed $30 million in tax increment financing. The ultimate cost of the facility was $103 million. The addition, known as the Expo at World Market Center building, began construction in August 2019. It was designed by Ed Vance & Associates Architects, and built by the Penta Building Group. The project was topped off on December 19, 2019, and was completed the following year, although its opening was delayed because of the COVID-19 pandemic. It eventually debuted on April 9, 2021.

== Features ==
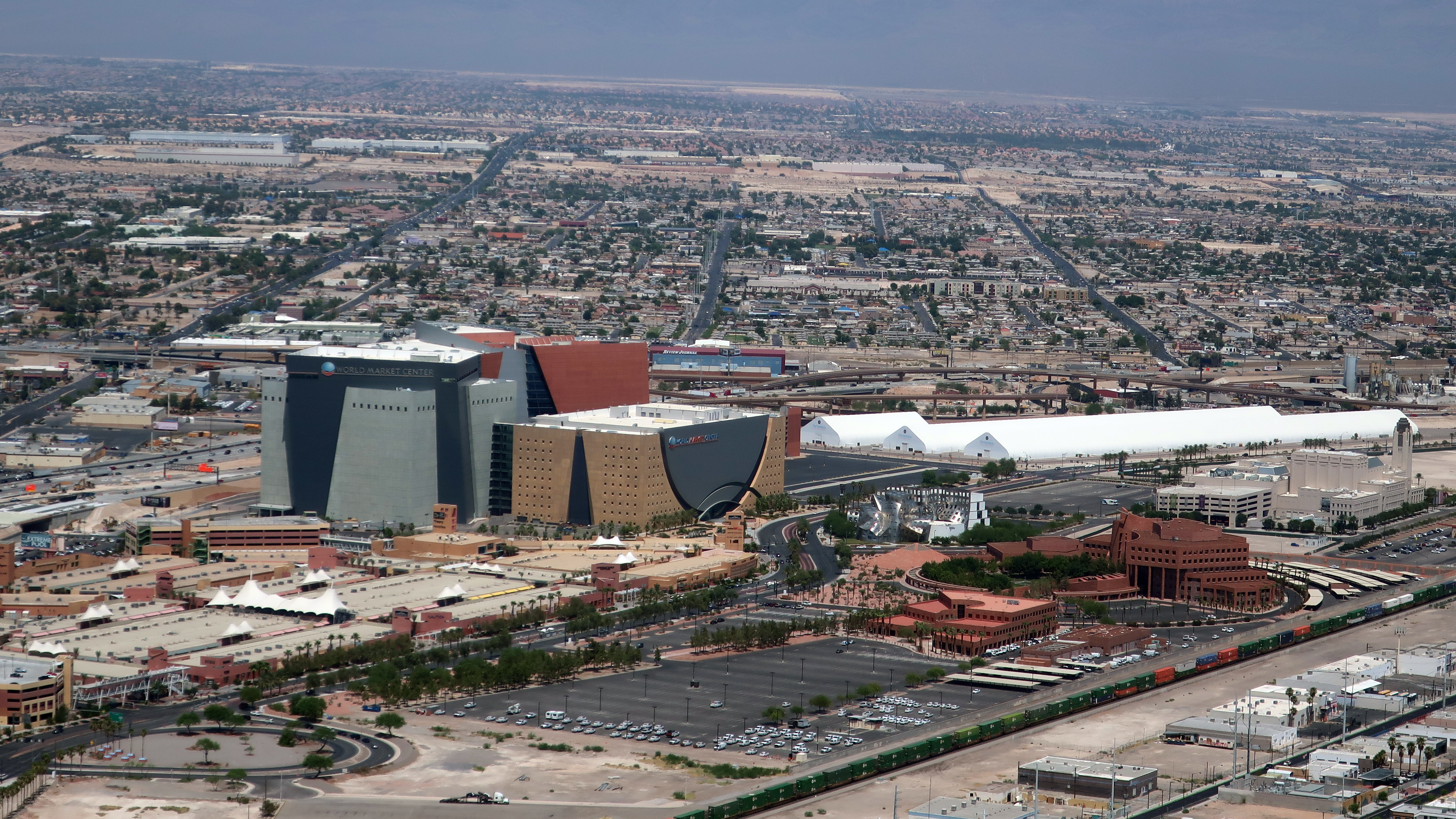
2018 aerial view of the World Market Center, with Pavilion tents to the right

The World Market Center has 5.3 million square feet (490,000 m^{2}) of space. It includes three primary buildings:

- Building A is a 10-story structure containing 1.3 million square feet (120,000 m^{2}). It was designed by Jerde Partnership International, in association with Las Vegas-based JMA Architecture Studios. Its facade features a swooping arc made of reflective metal panels, reminiscent of a half-moon or happy face. The structure cost $230 million to construct.
- Building B is 16 stories and contains 1.6 million square feet (150,000 m^{2}), and was built at a cost of $345 million.
- Building C is also 16 stories, and was designed by JMA as well. It cost $550 million, and contains 2.1 million square feet (200,000 m^{2}). Building C was accompanied by a seven-level parking garage, located directly north.

In addition to Building A, the World Market Center also opened with three large tent structures, known as the Pavilions. Each one measured 41 feet high and contained approximately 150,000 sq ft (14,000 m^{2}) of space. The structures included heating, cooling, restrooms, and wireless Internet access. They cost a total of $15 million.

The Expo at World Market Center is a 315,000 sq ft (29,300 m^{2}) facility that connects to Building C. Because of limited acreage, a large portion of the Expo facility was constructed within the first floor of the parking garage. The Pavilion tents, located across the street, were dismantled following completion of the Expo facility.

=== Las Vegas Market ===
The Las Vegas Market is a major trade show held at the World Market Center twice a year. The first event was held during July 25-29, 2005. It was launched as a West Coast rival to the twice-yearly International Home Furnishings Market in High Point. The show is open only to designers, retail buyers, and wholesalers.

Pas exhibitors have included Ashley Furniture Industries, Natuzzi, and Modway.

=== Las Vegas Design Center ===
When not hosting trade shows, the first two floors of Building A are open to the public as the Las Vegas Design Center, featuring numerous showrooms. It has operated since 2005, but was not opened to the public until 2009.

== Gallery ==
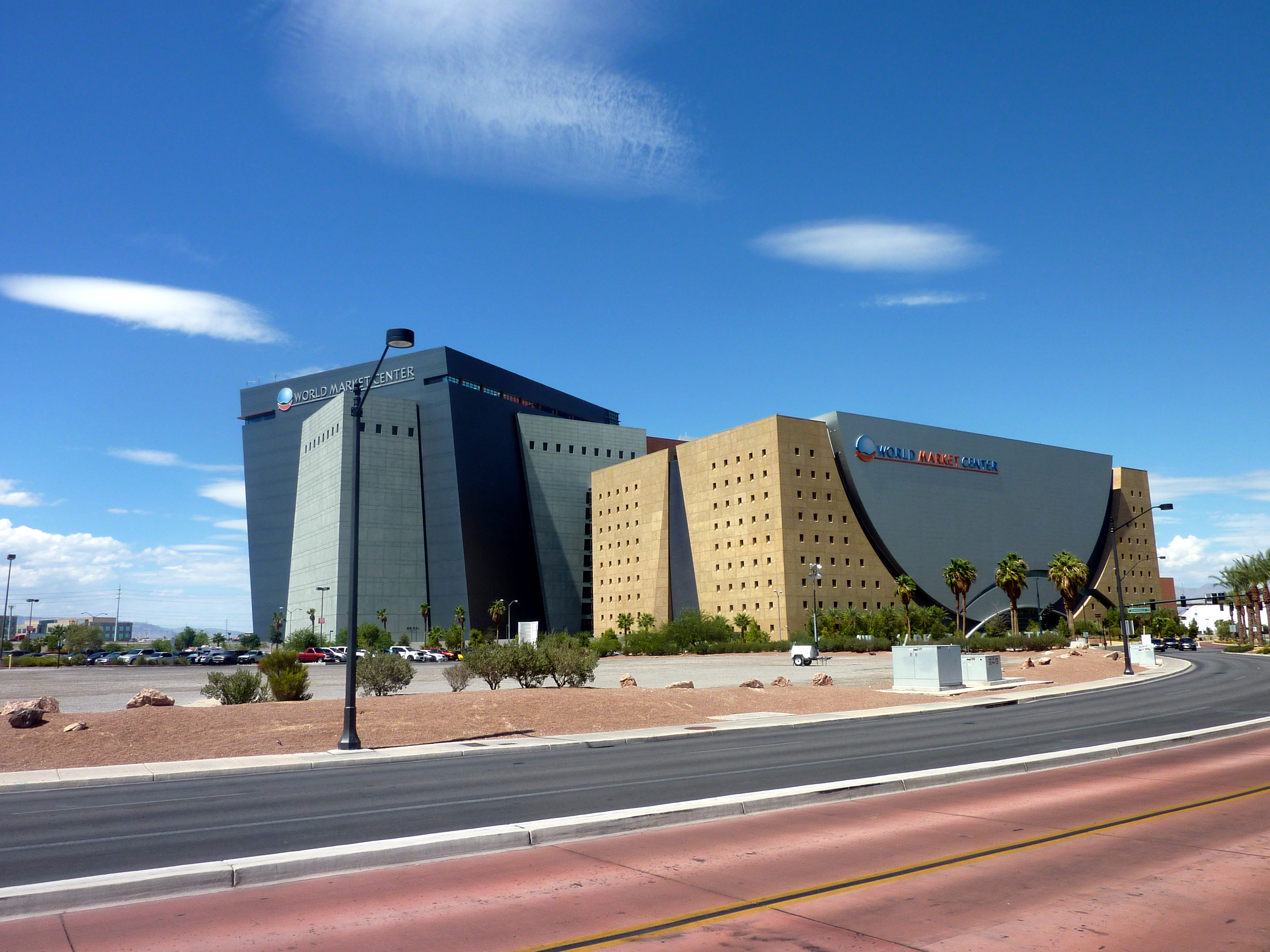
Buildings A (right) and B

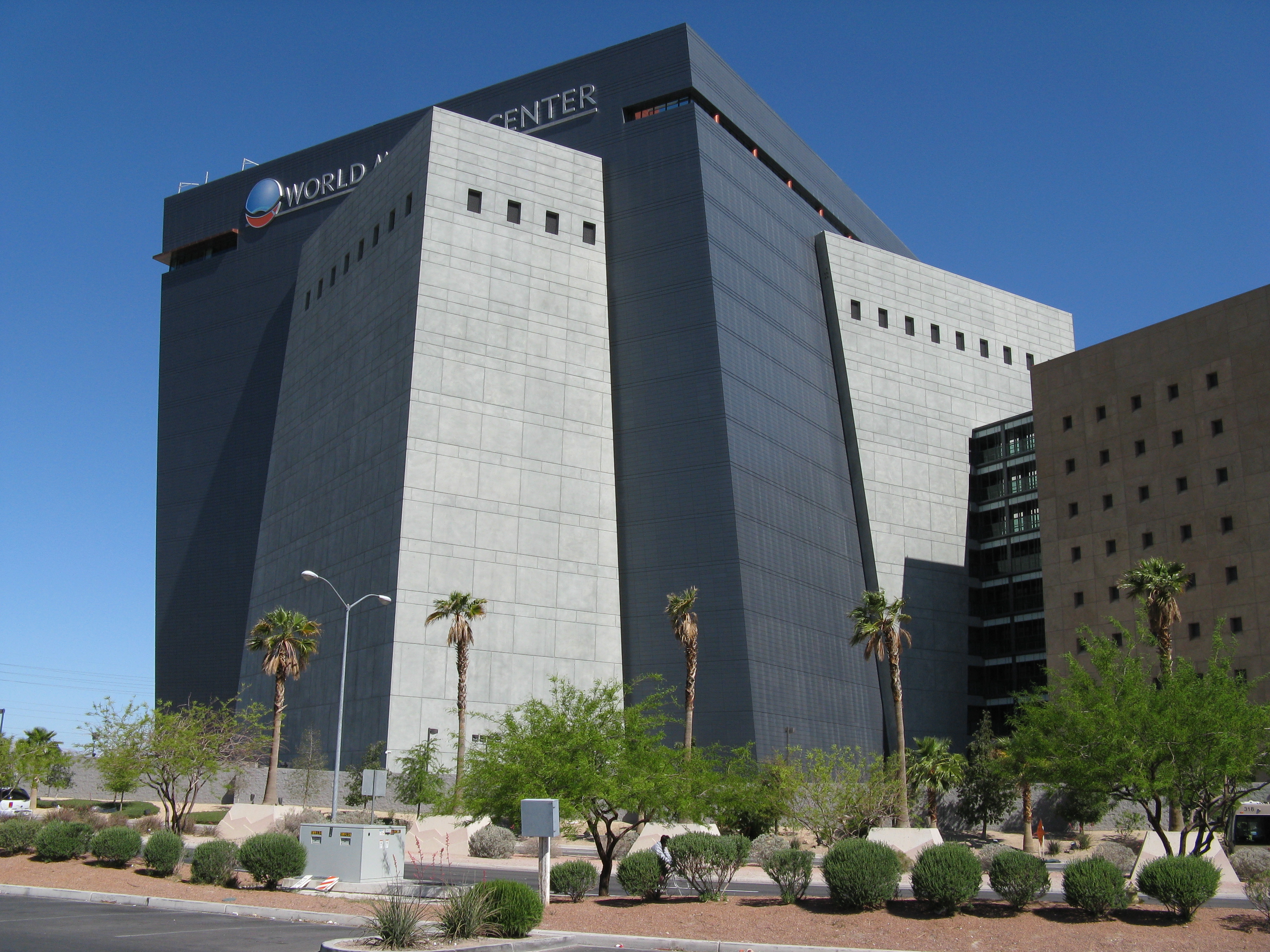
Building B

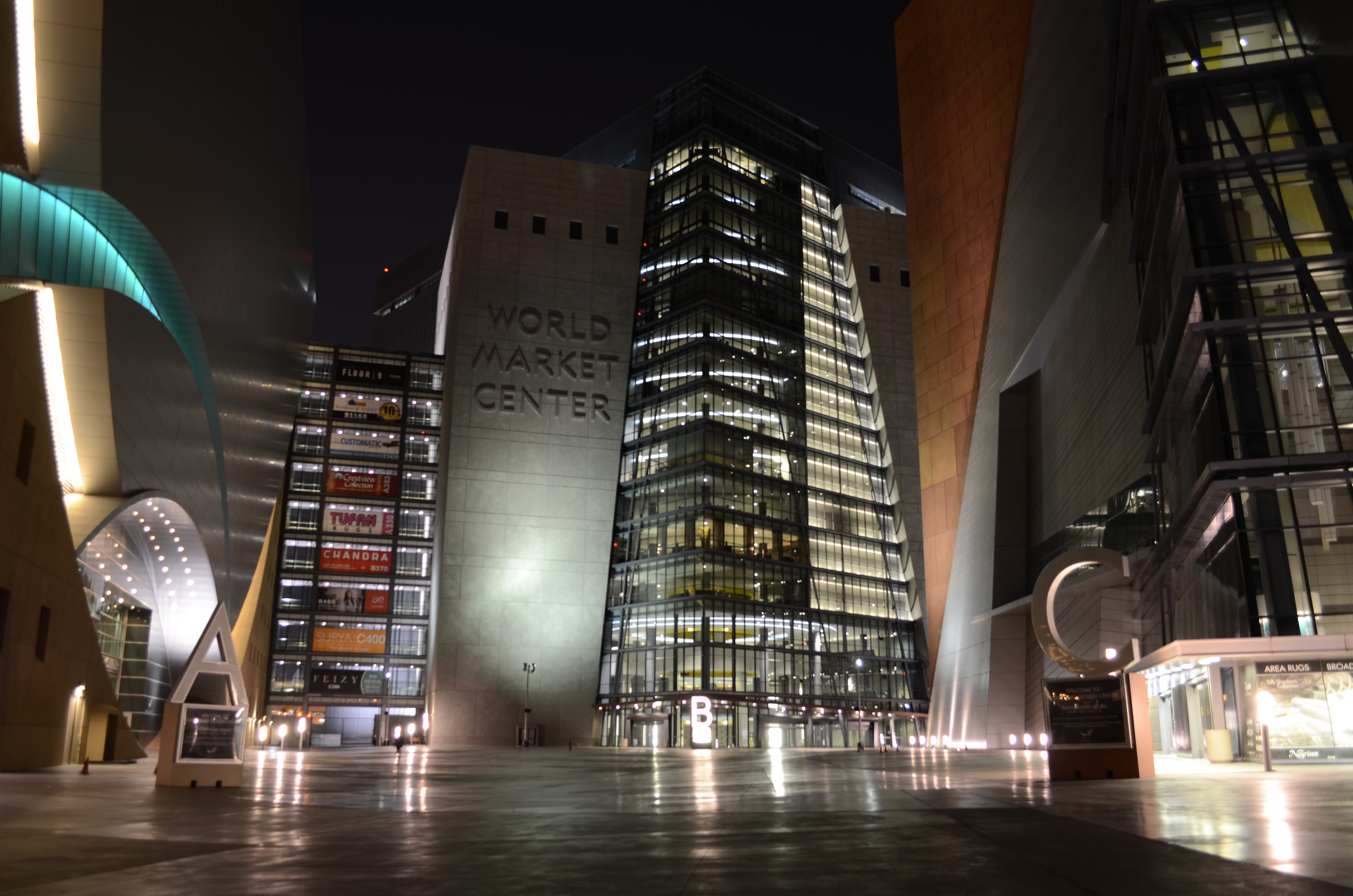
World Market Center plaza at night
