= High Point Market =

Home furnishing industry trade show

- Status: Active
- Genre: Furniture
- Location: High Point, North Carolina
- Country: USA
- Inaugurated: 1909 (as Southern Furniture Market)
- Organizer: High Point Market Authority
- Website: www.highpointmarket.org

The High Point Market (formerly the International Home Furnishings Market and the Southern Furniture Market), held in High Point, North Carolina, is the largest home furnishings industry trade show in the world, with over 11 million square feet (1 km^{2}) and about 2,000 exhibitors throughout about 180 buildings. The market holds two major shows each year in April and October, and attracts between 70,000 and 80,000 attendees. The High Point Market Authority coordinates the exposition, whose showrooms have nearly completely filled what had been the historic downtown. A 2018 Duke University study showed that the market contributed $6.7 billion to the area's economy.

== History ==
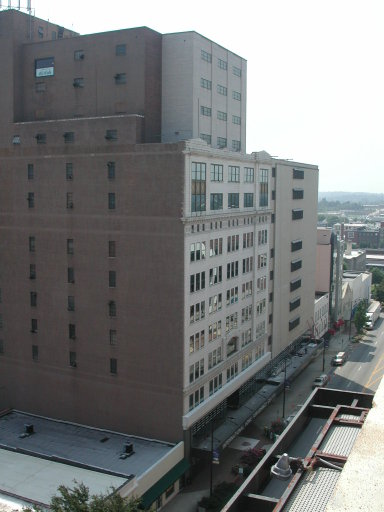
International Home Furnishings Center in High Point

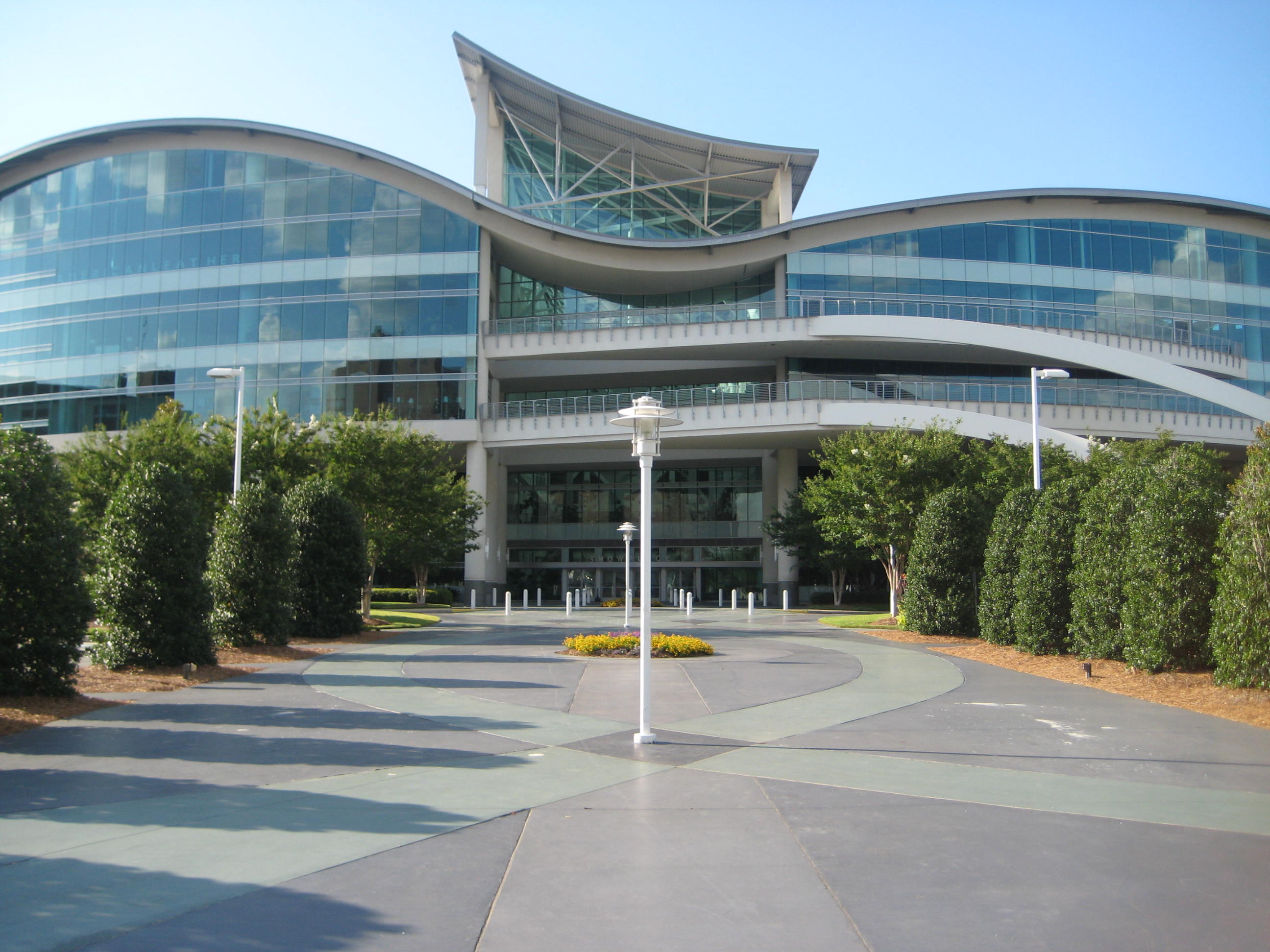
Showplace exposition building in High Point

The first formal Southern Furniture Market was held in High Point March 1–15, 1909. In 1921, the Southern Furniture Exposition Building opened for its first show June 20. Built in 19 months, the showroom cost approximately $1 million and held 249,000 square feet (23,100 m^{2}) of exhibition space. Regular shows were held in January and July. With the exception of 1943, the market was put on hold from 1941 until the end of World War II.

The $1 million 10-story Wrenn Wing was added to the Southern Furniture Exposition Building in 1950. The center's fourth expansion is connected to older parts of the building by glass walkways over Wrenn Street. During the 1950s, informal "in-between" markets began to emerge, hosting visitors in April and October. The main markets were still held in January and July. However, the size and scope of the mid-season marketing during April and October begin to surpass the January and July shows in the 1960s.

In the 1970s, showrooms other than the Southern Furniture Exposition Building gained stature, both in size and importance. In 1980, organizers in Dallas made a bid to host the major national home furnishings market. In 1982, marking a complete transition, the January and July shows were discontinued, leaving the April and October shows. Also in 1982, Market Square opened in the renovated Tomlinson Chair complex. It is credited with starting the dramatic increase in showroom space that made High Point a major furniture exhibition center.

The Southern Furniture Market was renamed the International Home Furnishings Market in 1989. High Point's largest showroom, the Southern Furniture Exposition Building, changed its name to the International Home Furnishings Center, or IHFC. With nearly 7,000,000 square feet (650,000 m^{2}) of furniture showroom space already available around the city, a decade-long showroom building boom began. In the 1990s, a construction boom added an additional 3,000,000 square feet (279,000 m^{2}) of showrooms to High Point. Showroom expansion continued in 2000, with the addition of new temporary exhibit spaces: The Suites at Market Square and Showplace. A year later, the 12th floor of the IHFC opened, giving the building 3,500,000 square feet (330,000 m^{2}) of space, more than 14 times its original size.

In 2001, organizers announced the formation of the High Point Market Authority, the official organizer of the Market. The next year, the Authority approached the N.C. General Assembly for the first time in its history seeking state support for the trade show, the largest event in the state of North Carolina. In 2003, the Market Authority began a massive shuttle service that today supports over 300,000 riders per year. The N.C. Department of Transportation set aside $900,000 for each of the next two years so the Authority could offer free shuttles to and from 100 hotels and the Piedmont Triad International Airport, Charlotte Douglas International Airport, and Raleigh-Durham International Airport. In 2005, a new transportation terminal, the Mendenhall Transportation Center, opened in downtown High Point to anchor the Market.

On March 12, 2020, the spring event was moved from its intended April 25–29 date to early June as a result of the ongoing COVID-19 pandemic; it was cancelled April 16. It marked the second time the Market was cancelled, with World War II being in the first.

The Market's 70,000-80,000 attendees include exhibitors, buyers, designers, and media in the furniture industry. Among the High Point Market attendees transacting business are widely known figures from other arenas who participate in the home furnishings industry, including Martha Stewart, Kathy Ireland, Alexander Julian, Jonathan Adler, Oscar de la Renta, Candice Olsen, Paula Deen, Drew Scott, Jonathan Scott, and Charles Spencer.

== Private equity investment in High Point Market ==
In May 2011, the High Point Market and the Las Vegas World Market Center were combined into the new firm International Market Centers (IMC). This transaction consolidated the major showroom facilities in downtown High Point, over 60% of the city's showroom space. IMC was backed by funds from Bain Capital and Oaktree Capital. The list of IMC's High Point properties included the International Home Furnishings Center, Market Square, Market Square Tower, Suites at Market Square, Plaza Suites, Furniture Plaza, National Furniture Mart, Hamilton Market, Showplace, Showplace West and, later, the Commerce and Design Building, as well as several other freestanding buildings. The ownership of more than 50% of downtown High Point real estate by private equity marked a new era for the Market. In September 2017, Blackstone Inc. and Fireside Investments purchased IMC, which at the time owned 14 buildings with 6.7 million square feet in High Point. IMC has since changed its name to Andmore. As of 2026, IMC and Andmore had spent $115 million in High Point.

== Furniture cluster and niche city ==
The High Point Market has been noted for being a significant part of the region's furniture business cluster, which was discussed by urbanist Richard Florida and initially by economist Michael Porter. The High Point Market's relationship to downtown High Point is the focus of the book Showroom City by urban sociologist John Joe Schlichtman. Describing its ability to capture the global furniture merchandising market, Schlichtman describes High Point as a "niche city" or "a city that forges global centrality by creating an economic specialization in a specific segment of the global service economy."

Since about 2013, Chabad of Greensboro has rented a temporary showroom during the semiannual market where Jewish furniture-industry visitors can pray, rest, and obtain kosher meals; in 2023, about 150 people were reported to use the space during a market day.
