= Charlie Palmer Hotel =

American proposed hotel in Las Vegas, Nevada

- Interactive map of the Charlie Palmer Hotel area
- Etymology: Charlie Palmer

General information
- Status: On hold
- Location: Symphony Park, Las Vegas, Nevada, United States
- Coordinates: 36.170274°N 115.151220°W

Design and construction
- Developer: Charlie Palmer; Richard Kaufman

Other information
- Number of rooms: 371

Website
- Official website (archived)

Charlie Palmer Hotel was a proposed 371-room hotel planned for 3 acres (1.2 ha) of land at Symphony Park in downtown Las Vegas. As of September 2014, the project was on hold. A 2022 article claimed that the project was "no longer in the neighborhood plans."

The project was announced by chef Charlie Palmer as a boutique condo hotel in 2006, with groundbreaking scheduled for later that year. In 2007, the proposed location for the project was changed to Symphony Park, and the condominium was removed from the project. The opening had initially been scheduled for November 2011, but the start of construction was delayed several times between 2010 and 2014, due to the poor state of the local hotel market. The project was shelved by 2022.

== History ==
=== Original project ===
The Charlie Palmer Hotel was announced by chef Charlie Palmer in April 2006. The project would have included a 35-story boutique condo hotel with 400 to 500 rooms, primarily consisting of studio and one-bedroom units that would range from 550 sq ft (51 m^{2}) to 800 sq ft (74 m^{2}). The project was to be built on the three-acre site of the Golden Palm Hotel, located at the intersection of Tropicana Avenue and Dean Martin Drive. The project was to cost $400 million, and was scheduled to break ground later in 2006, with its completion expected for mid-2008. Palmer's partners in the project included Marvin Lipschultz, the owner of the property; Bill Richardson, the owner of W.A. Richardson Construction and a former executive for Mandalay Resort Group; and Dan Juba, the principal of the locally based Klai Juba Architects. Adam Tihany, who designed the interior for Palmer's Aureole restaurant in Las Vegas, was also involved in the new project.

Palmer said the project would not include a casino or gambling: "Our focus is on the guest experience, not walking them through a casino and getting them to game." The hotel was to have a sky lounge, event space on the top floor, a night club and cigar bar, and three restaurants, including the first sushi bar to be owned by Palmer. Amenities would include a health spa, a hair salon, sommelier service, and a 24-hour concierge service.

=== New location ===
By May 2007, the project's proposed location was moved to Union Park, an undeveloped 61-acre property in downtown Las Vegas that was subsequently renamed Symphony Park. In December 2008, Palmer still planned to proceed with the project, with an opening scheduled for November 2011, to coincide with the opening of the adjacent Smith Center for the Performing Arts. At the time, the project was to consist of 426 rooms; no condominium aspect was specified for the project. The hotel would be located on 3 acres (1.2 ha) of land located north of the Smith Center. Richard Kaufman, the president of City-Core Development and a partner with The Charlie Palmer Group, was involved with the project at that time as a developer.

In February 2010, the Las Vegas City Council allowed Palmer to delay construction for two to four years, due to a poor economy. Construction had been scheduled to begin later that year. Bill Arent, the director of the city's office of business development, said, "We believe this extension is in the best interest of making this project happen. This project was proposed as a hospitality project, a non-gaming hotel. The hospitality market right now in Las Vegas is struggling and is to experience some challenges in a few years to come." Kaufman said, "The idea of this hotel is to bring an experience that I don't think exists in Las Vegas, and really concentrating on the non-gaming person who comes to Las Vegas, whether it's for business or recreation or what have you."

In March 2011, Kaufman said that the project would remain on hold because of the poor hotel economy. Kaufman also confirmed that condominiums were no longer a part of the project. In March 2012, Kaufman said the project did not have a start date, as he and Palmer were waiting for construction costs to decrease and for hotel-room rates to increase so the project could be financially viable. Kaufman said the project could be built in phases, with the first phase to consist of 50 to 100 rooms and a restaurant by Palmer. The project, at that time, was to include an ultimate total of 371 rooms. Kaufman said one problem in progressing the project was the uncertainty of what type of other nearby projects would be constructed at Symphony Park in the future.

In March 2013, the Las Vegas City Council unanimously approved a one-year extension for the start of construction on the project, as Kaufman said room rates had not increased enough for the hotel to operate: "The problem is room rates are low so we need to spend less money because we can't charge more. How do we make it more affordable to build?" Kaufman said a potential solution would be the construction of a 100-room hotel with a restaurant, with the possibility of expanding the project as part of a later second phase.

In September 2013, Palmer confirmed that he still planned to build the hotel but said, "The big question there is what's going to happen around that piece of land. Originally there were nine or 10 projects on the slate, and a lot of them fell out. There's been talk of a stadium on the land adjacent to our property. It's hard to build and spend $200 or $300 million on a project not knowing who your neighbors are going to be". In September 2014, the project was on hold until a decision was made regarding the proposed stadium in Symphony Park.

A 2022 article stated the project was no longer proceeding.
