= Downtown (Nevada gaming area) =

Nevada Gaming Control Board term for area in and around Fremont Street

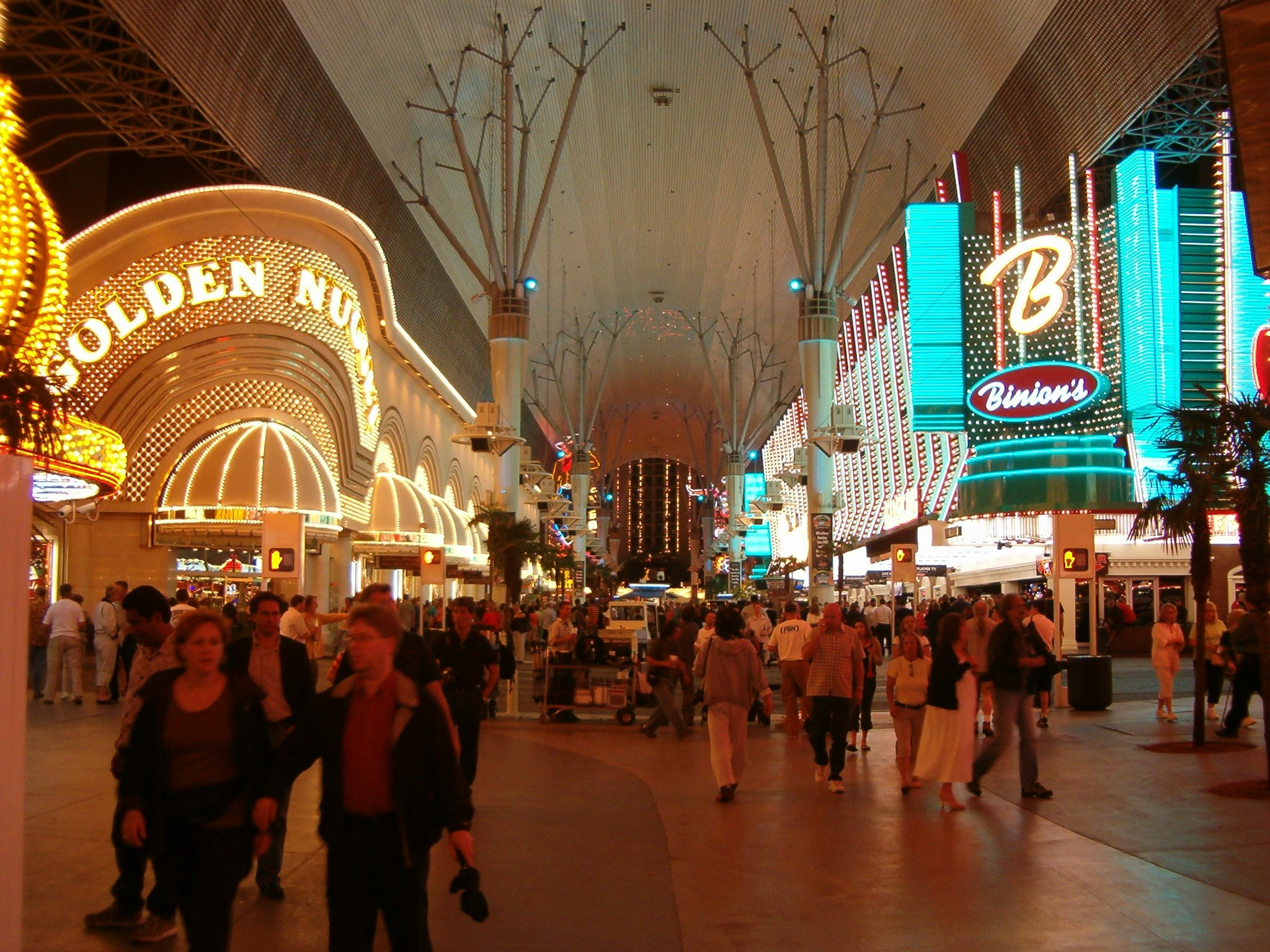
Center of Fremont Street in May 2008

"Downtown Las Vegas Area" is the name assigned by the Nevada Gaming Control Board (NGCB) which includes the Downtown Las Vegas area casinos and The Strat casino tower which is located 2 miles (3.2 km) from Fremont Street. The city of Las Vegas uses the term Downtown Gaming for the casinos near the Fremont Street Experience. The land is part of the 110 acres (45 ha) that were auctioned on May 15, 1905 when the city was founded.

== Downtown competition ==
In the fiscal year 1988 the ratio of revenue for the Strip compared to downtown was less than 3:1. By 2008, gambling on the Strip had grown to outpace downtown by over 10:1. However, downtown rode the massive increase in tourist spending from 2004 through 2007 that swelled the non-gaming revenue of the area. Non-gaming revenue and income hit an all-time high in 2006.

The population of the city of Las Vegas has increased from 249,000 in 1990 to over 600,000 in 2010. In the interim three major hotels have been constructed inside the city limits (Stratosphere Las Vegas, Suncoast Hotel and Casino, and JW Marriott Rampart Casino). The downtown casino district with over 1100 employees has remained important to the city.

== Casinos in the Downtown Nevada Gaming Area ==
This table includes large casinos inside the area limits. The table, game, and slot count is valid on December 31, 2008. The category of over $1 million and under $12 million are re-evaluated every fiscal year. FSE means Fremont Street Experience. Games refers to table games. License numbers are issued by city of Las Vegas.

City of Las Vegas Downtown Casinos (as of July 31, 2009)
License	Name	Category	Owner	FSE	Keno	Bingo	Sports	Poker	Games	Slots
G08-00014	Golden Nugget	>$72m	Landry's Restaurants	Yes	Yes		Yes	13	71	1358
G08-00003	California	>$12m	Boyd Gaming		Yes		Yes		32	1100
G08-00023	Main Street Station	>$12m	Boyd Gaming						19	881
G08-00010	Fremont	>$12m	Boyd Gaming	Yes	Yes		Yes		31	1092
G08-00009	Four Queens	>$12m	TLC	Yes	Yes		Yes		31	1026
G08-00075	Binion's	>$12m	TLC	Yes			Yes	50	52	800
G08-00051	The D Las Vegas	>$12m	Stevens	Yes	Yes			6	31	980 Fitzgeralds became The D Las Vegas Casino Hotel - Fall 2012
G08-00006	El Cortez	>$12m	Epstein		Yes		Yes	3	21	1025
G08-00078	Plaza	>$12m	Tamares			Yes	Yes	3	23	800
G08-00060	Las Vegas Club	>$12m	Stevens	Yes					15	700
G08-00032	Stratosphere Las Vegas	>$12m	ACEP				Yes	8	56	1300

== Monthly executive summary ==
A monthly report of gaming revenue is released about five weeks after the end of the month. These statistics are posted in several locations on the Internet. The Las Vegas Convention and Visitors Authority (LVCVA) posts an executive summary for forty one categories. The number that gets the most attention is the percentage change of gaming revenue from the same month the previous year.

Historical data is released in various formats. The LVCVA maintains year to date and year end tables with on their site back to calendar year 2002. Data presented in graphic form covering several years is easier to visualize.

== Nevada Gaming Control Board publications ==
The NGCB maintains a list of publications. Cumulative data is reported in fiscal years (FY) (July 1 to June 30) instead of calendar years.

Downtown Las Vegas currently has 16 nonrestricted gaming locations that earn more than $1 million per year in gaming revenue. Since fiscal year 1990 when the Mirage opened on the Las Vegas Strip gaming revenue downtown has been flat. Non-gaming revenue has increased, but income also remains relatively flat. Some of the smaller casinos have since closed, and one major casinos hotel, (The Stratosphere) has opened. On average, the casinos that have less than $12 million per year in gaming revenue have a negative income.

- Based on numbers of hotel rooms, slot machines, and table games the three largest operations are (not in order of revenue) the Golden Nugget, the Stratosphere Las Vegas and Boyd Gaming downtown division which consists of the Main Street Casino, the California Hotel and Casino, and the Fremont Casino.
- In 1990 one of the 11 casinos in the over $12 million category was the Golden Gate Hotel and Casino, but revenue is now under $12 million. The Stratosphere has taken its place.
- Of the 5 current license holders in the under $12 million category, 3 of them currently offer slot machines only (no table games, poker, racing or sports), and only 2 of them have small attached hotels (100 rooms apiece).

The Downtown Las Vegas Nonrestricted locations have 9,636 rooms. The number of gaming devices in comparison with other areas. Locations with over $1M per year gaming
Area December 2008	Locations	Slot Machines	Table Games	Card Games	Calendar Year 2008 Gaming ($m)
Downtown	16	12,034	395	50	$578
Strip Area	41	50,158	2,737	403	$6,126
Clark County	151	125,892	4,403	722	$9,768
Statewide	261	171,693	5,605	913	$11,543

For Downtown Las Vegas, the total revenue dropped after September 11 attacks in 2001 as it did in most resort areas including the Strip. Total revenue includes all sources of revenue for the property (food, drinks, attractions, etc.). Unlike the strip, income remained slightly positive, but revenue did not recover for three years. Profitability was restored during this period solely through cost-cutting measures. An analysis of the data could reveal how much of the cost-cutting was payroll, cost of goods (food and beverage), and number of employees.

Beginning with December 2001, all of the properties changed ownership, at least once, with the exception of the 3 properties in the Boyd Gaming downtown division. Most ownership changes are accompanied by attempts to upgrade the properties with new restaurants, clubs, renovations, and games.

Post 9-11 Revenue and Income for Downtown Las Vegas (gaming over $1m per year)
FY	Fiscal Year	Income %	Total Revenue $m	Gaming Revenue $m
01	Jul 2000 – Jun 2001	1.89%	$1,102.63	$671.9
02	Jul 2001 – Jun 2002	0.05%	$1,085.73	$661.4
03	Jul 2002 – Jun 2003	2.20%	$1,085.72	$655.2
04	Jul 2003 – Jun 2004	3.88%	$1,085.73	$653.4
05	Jul 2004 – Jun 2005	4.42%	$1,112.60	$658.6

Tom Breitling and Tim Poster were the highest profile successful entrepreneurs who profited in the downtown market during the last crisis. As recounted in Tom Breitling's book, Double or Nothing, the partners agreed to buy the Golden Nugget and had an agreement to sell the property after operating it for only one year. The partners made $113 million in profit called the highest rate of return in such a short time in the gaming industry.

By FY2006 total revenue for downtown exceeded that of FY2004 by $106 million. Margins (income over revenue), income, and revenue all reach record highs for downtown. Margins even surpass the Strip according to NGCB Data. Although the sale of the Golden Nugget is completed after six months needed to earn gaming license, no casino purchases are negotiated this fiscal year. Heartened by the improving economic conditions, the Lady Luck is closed for complete renovations.

On February 21, 2008 Carl Icahn sold his four Southern Nevada casinos, comprising American Casino & Entertainment Properties anchored by the Stratosphere Las Vegas and realized a gain of $1 billion after a decade of investing in the market. The price for the properties was agreed on the previous April, and was based on an appraised value of $718.443 million for the land. Although revenue drop has been comparatively benign in the recession, the interest on the long term notes for this land speculation has made the company unprofitable.

== Revenue since July 1, 2006 ==
Fiscal year 2006 (July 1, 2005 through June 30, 2006) set all time records for downtown Las Vegas in terms of total revenue gaming and non-gaming. Revenue in FY2007 and FY2008 dropped. But like the rest of Nevada FY2009 was the most severe fiscal year since downtown gaming peaked in the early 1990s.

- Boyd Gaming reported their year end revenue on February 26, 2009. The downtown properties are one of the relatively brightest properties in their portfolio. The total revenue for the calendar year 2009 was $229 million vs $240 million for the year 2008 and $255 million for 2007. Collectively the Boyd Downtown Division is the currently the largest operation inside the downtown region.

== Future prospects ==
The Lou Ruvo Brain Institute is currently finished construction. The Smith Center for the Performing Arts was completed in 2012.

At the site of the former Holy Cow casino and brewery, which closed in May 2002, a developer received preliminary approval to build a 98-foot (30 m)-tall video screen and a new casino. Aspen Highlands Holdings hoped that the eye-catching attraction at the entrance to the city of Las Vegas would attract gamblers to the casino without an attached hotel. Instead, the property was turned into a two-story Walgreens.

Profitability has the potential to increase after March 28, 2010 when the ACE bus rapid transit project comes on line. The ACE rapid transit system will have the appearance and feel of a light rail transit network. Traffic lights will be controlled by a system similar to the one that emergency vehicles use. This modern transit system made travel from Fremont Street to the Convention Center virtually the same as the Las Vegas Monorail transit time from in front of the MGM Grand.

Some downtown casinos may come on the market in the near future, as an investor will be eager to try to repeat the success of Breitling, Poster and Icahn. In an article by journalist Ben Spillman, he describes a report that looks at historical costs and provides accurate estimates of revenues of the individual downtown casinos.
