= Las Vegas Post Office and Courthouse =

- U.S. Post Office and Courthouse
- U.S. National Register of Historic Places
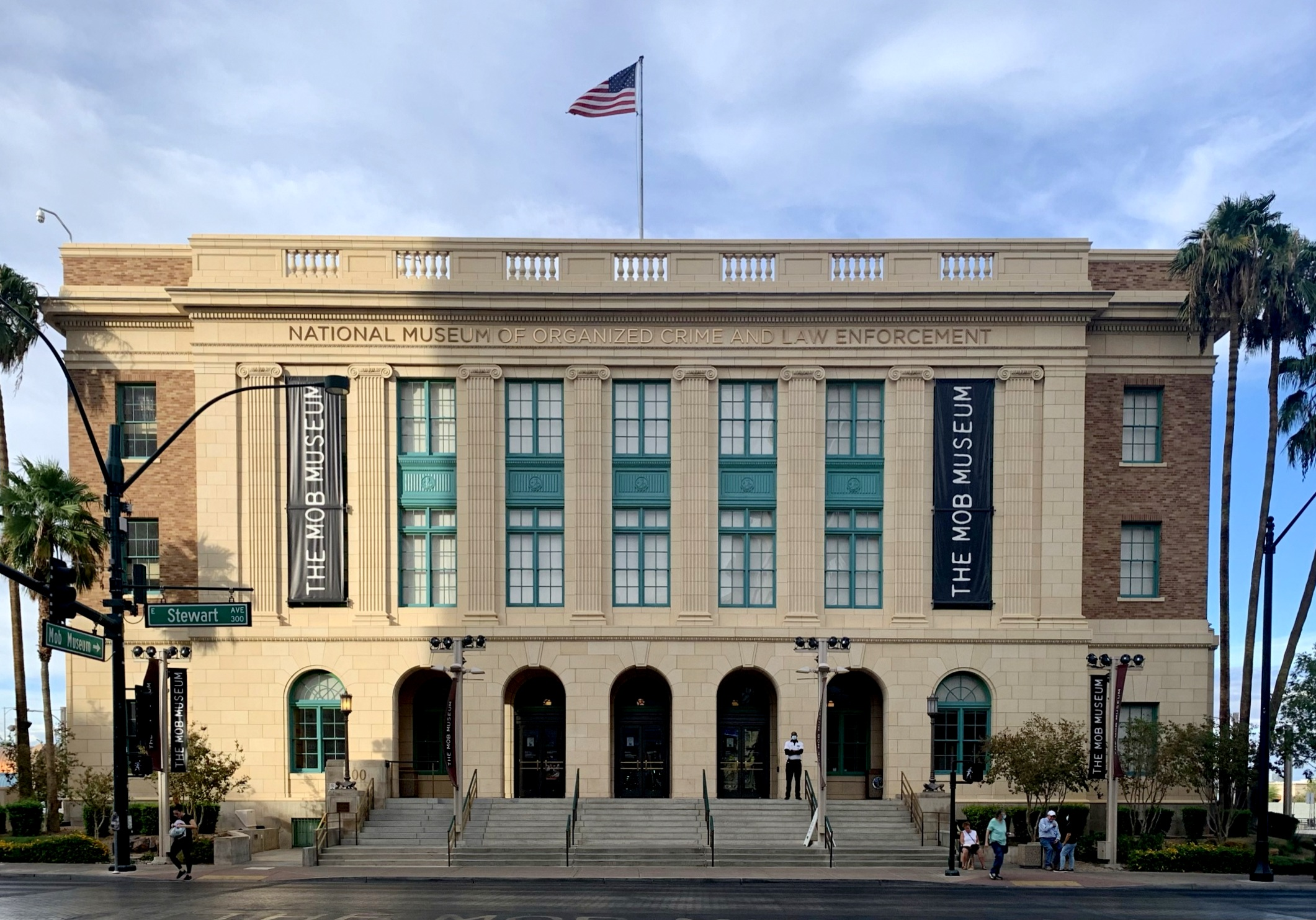
- Street view of the building
- Location: 300 E. Stewart Ave. Las Vegas, Nevada
- Coordinates: 36.172823°N 115.141252°W
- Built: 1931-1933
- Architect: Office of the Supervising Architect under James A. Wetmore
- Architectural style: Classical Revival
- NRHP reference No.: 83001108
- Added to NRHP: February 10, 1983

Las Vegas Post Office and Courthouse is a Neo-classical building located in Downtown Las Vegas, Nevada. It is listed on the United States National Register of Historic Places.

== History ==
The building was erected between 1931 and 1933, dedicated on November 11, 1933. It served as a post office, and as a court house of the United States District Court for the District of Nevada.

The building was listed in the National Register of Historic Places on February 10, 1983. The building remained an active post office for several more years.

Control of the building was turned over to the city in 2002 for use as a museum and cultural center.

== Mob Museum ==
The building was restored and renovated into the National Museum of Organized Crime and Law Enforcement in February 2012.

== Sources ==
- Historic Federal Building web site
