= Downtown Las Vegas =

Central business district in Nevada, United States

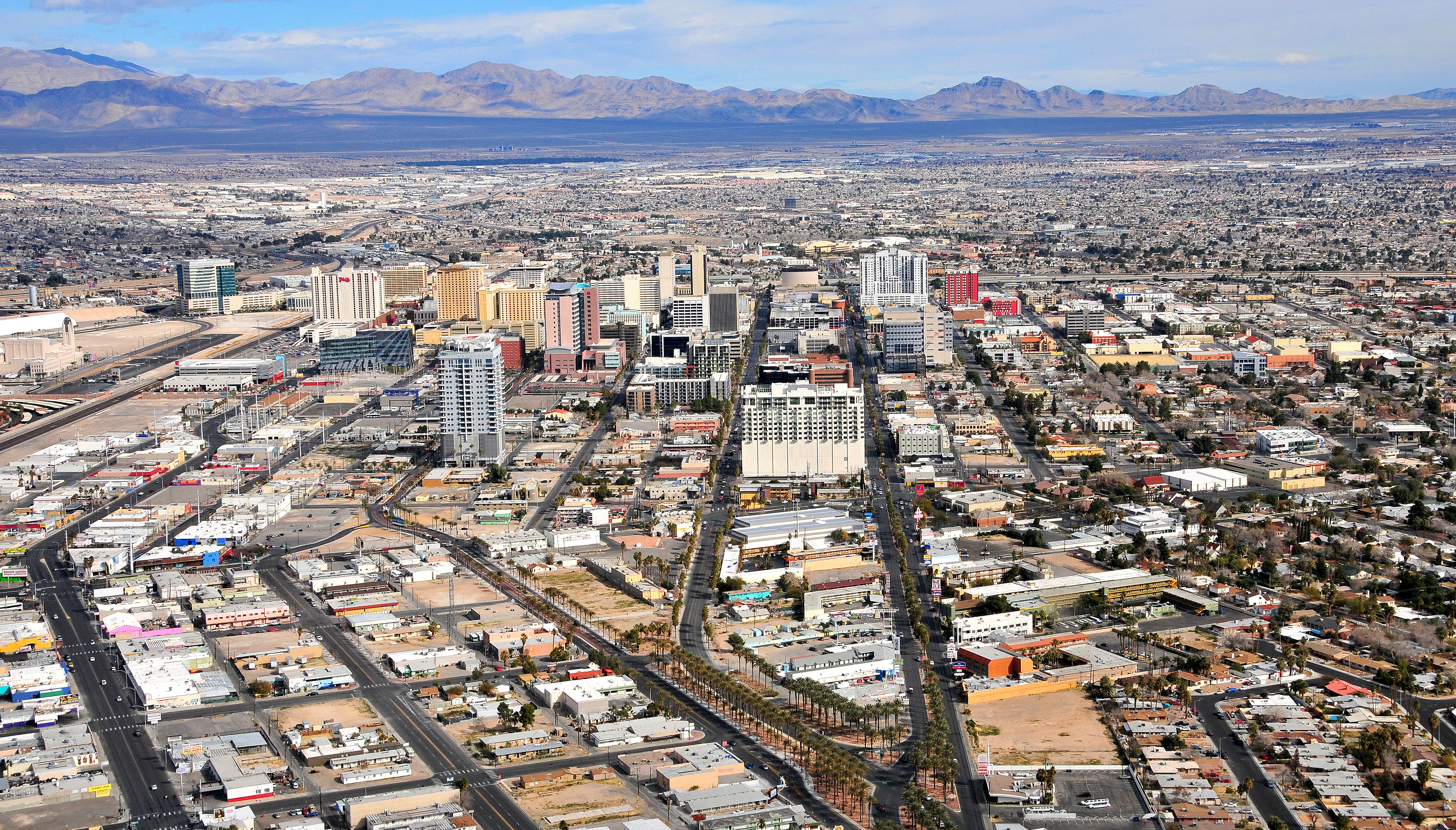
- Downtown Las Vegas

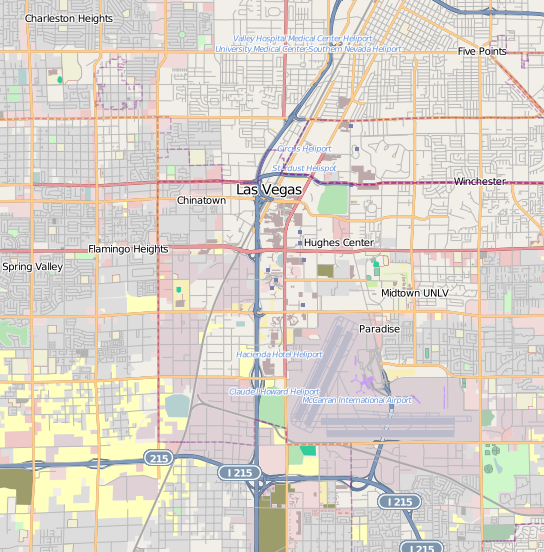
- Location within Downtown Las Vegas Location within Las Vegas Boulevard Location within Nevada
- Coordinates: 36.17169°N 115.14382°W
- Country: United States
- State: Nevada
- County: Clark

Downtown Las Vegas (commonly abbreviated as DTLV) is the central business district and historic center of Las Vegas, Nevada, United States. It is the original townsite, and the Downtown Gaming Area was the primary gambling district of Las Vegas prior to the Strip. As the urban core of the Las Vegas Valley, it features a variety of hotel and business highrises, cultural centers, historical buildings and government institutions, as well as residential and retail developments. Downtown is located in the center of the Las Vegas Valley and just north of the Las Vegas Strip, centered on Fremont Street, the Fremont Street Experience and Fremont East. The city defines the area as bounded by I-15 on the west, Washington Avenue on the north, Maryland Parkway on the east and Sahara Avenue on the south.

== History ==
=== Before incorporation ===
Perhaps the earliest visitors to the Las Vegas area were nomadic Paleo-Indians, who traveled to the area 10,000 years ago, leaving behind petroglyphs. Anasazi and Paiute tribes came here at least 2,000 years ago.

The area was named Las Vegas, which is Spanish for the meadows, in the 1800s because it featured abundant wild grasses, as well as desert spring waters for westward travelers.

The year 1844 marked the arrival of John C. Frémont, whose writings helped lure pioneers to the area. Downtown Las Vegas' Fremont Street is named after him.

Eleven years later, members of the Church of Jesus Christ of Latter-day Saints chose Las Vegas as the site to build a fort halfway between Salt Lake City and Los Angeles, where they would travel to gather supplies. The fort was abandoned several years afterward. The remainder of this fort can still be seen at the intersection of Las Vegas Boulevard and Washington Avenue at the Old Las Vegas Mormon Fort State Historic Park.

=== Incorporation and growth ===
Las Vegas was founded as a city in 1905, when 110 acres (45 ha) of land adjacent to the Union Pacific Railroad tracks were auctioned in what would become the downtown area. The first hotel in the area, the Hotel Nevada, was built in 1906; it is still operating as the Golden Gate Hotel and Casino. In 1911, Las Vegas was incorporated as a city.

The year 1931 was a pivotal one for Las Vegas. At that time, Nevada legalized casino gambling and reduced residency requirements for divorce to six weeks. This year also witnessed the beginning of construction on nearby Hoover Dam. The influx of construction workers and their families helped Las Vegas avoid economic calamity during the Great Depression. It was completed in 1935.

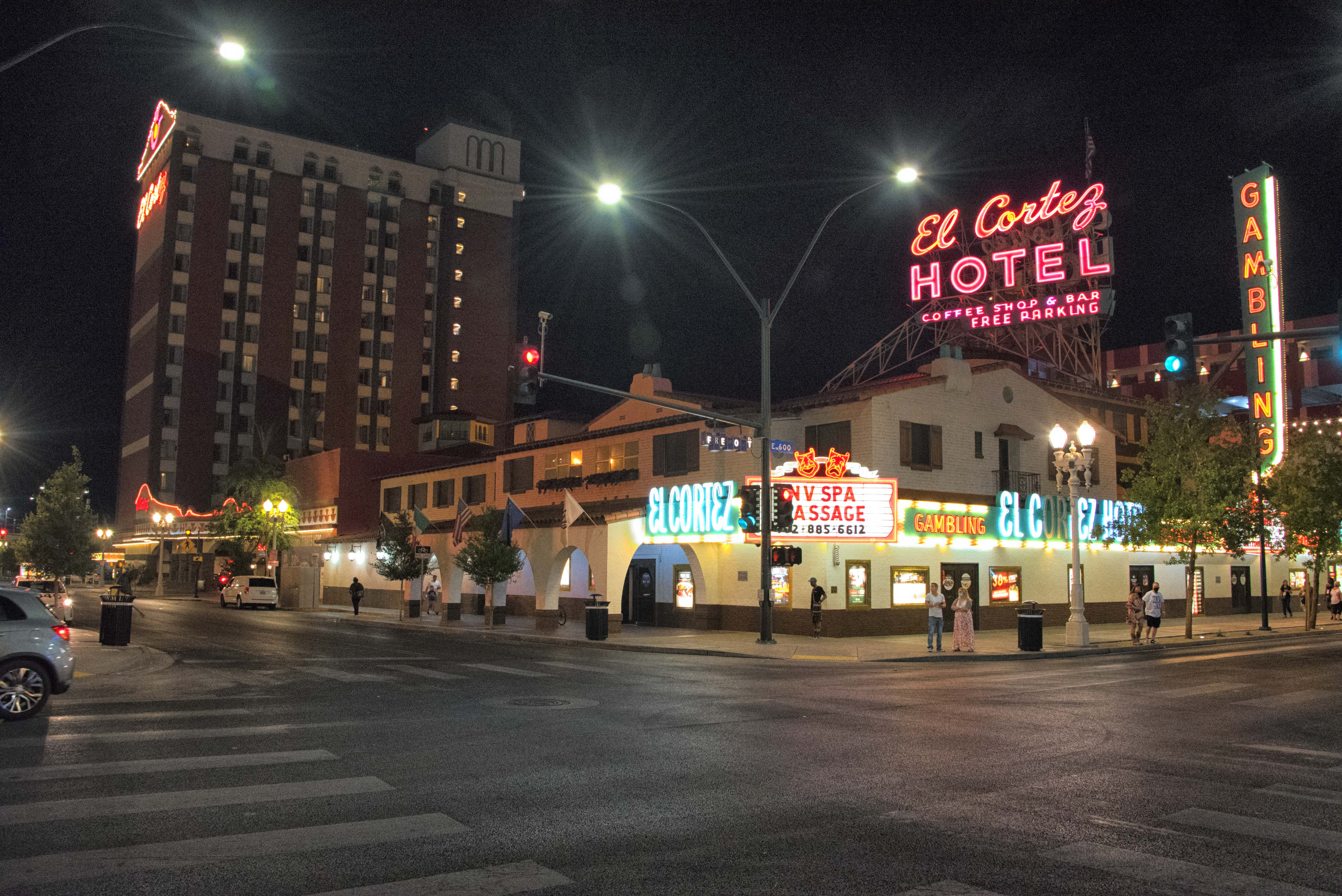
El Cortez (photographed in 2021)

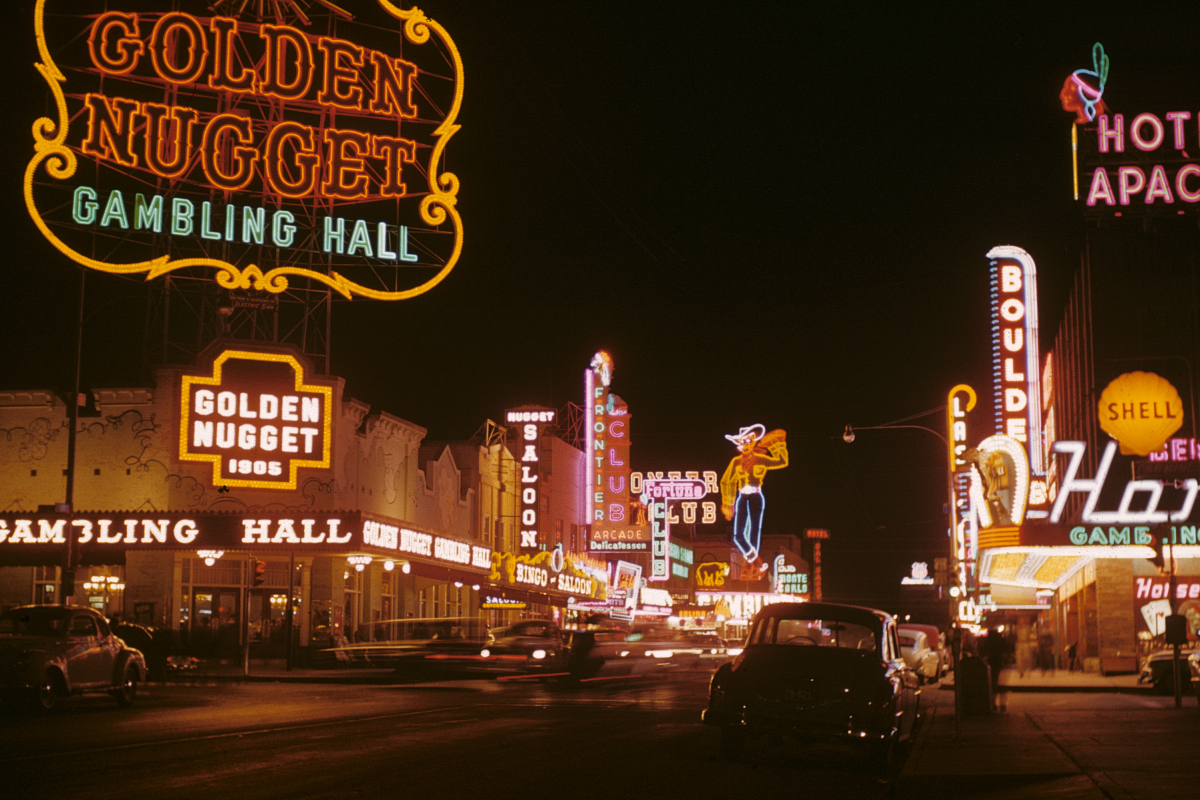
Fremont Street (1952), night view directed west; prominent neon signs include the Golden Nugget and Vegas Vic

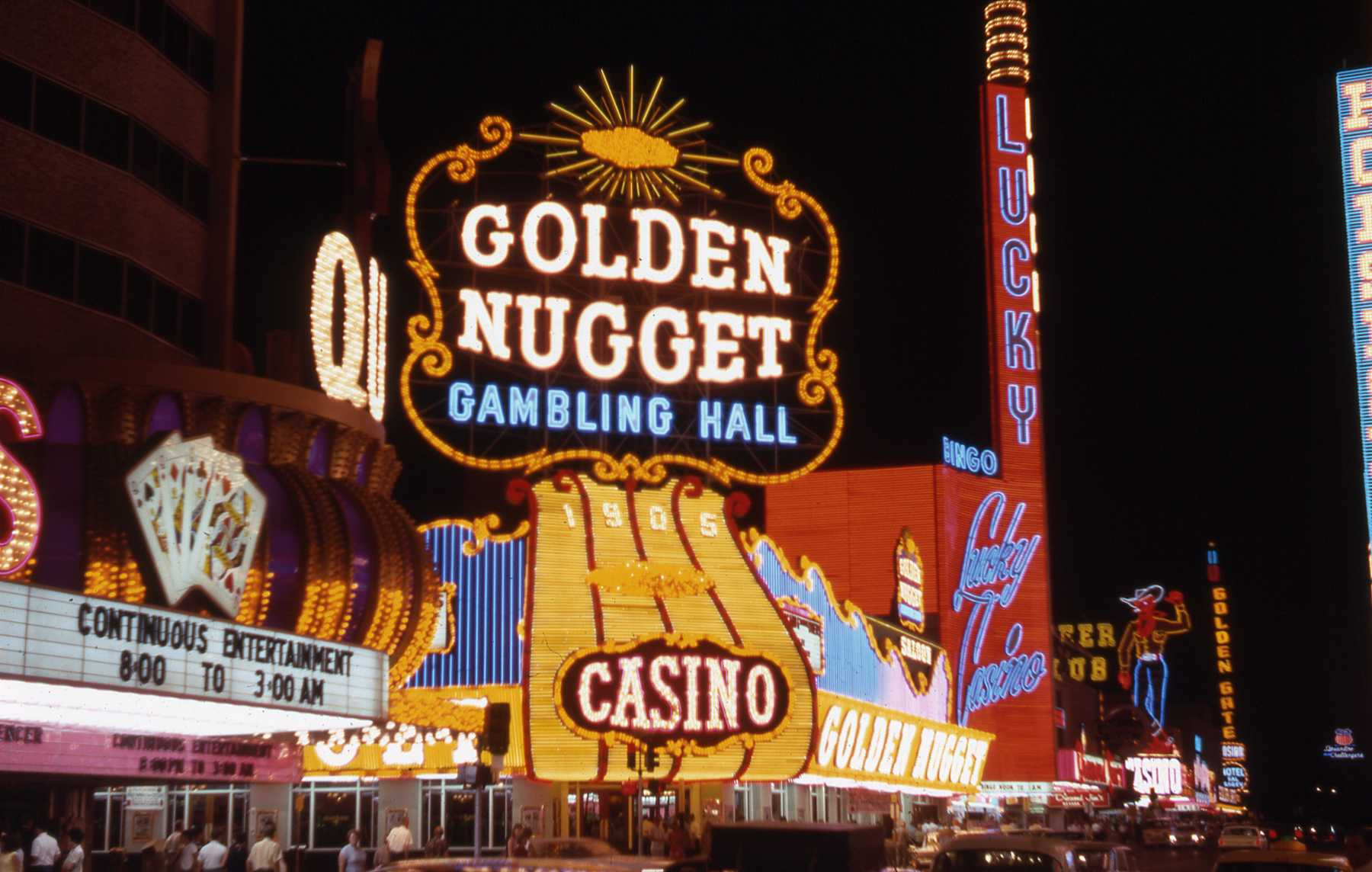
Fremont Street (1964), night view directed west; Golden Nugget decoration is much brighter

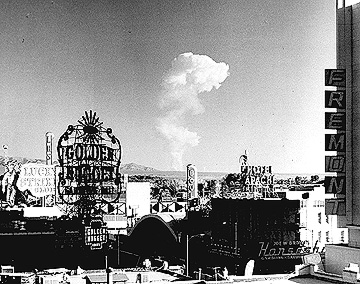
Mushroom cloud over the Nevada Test Site, viewed from downtown Las Vegas

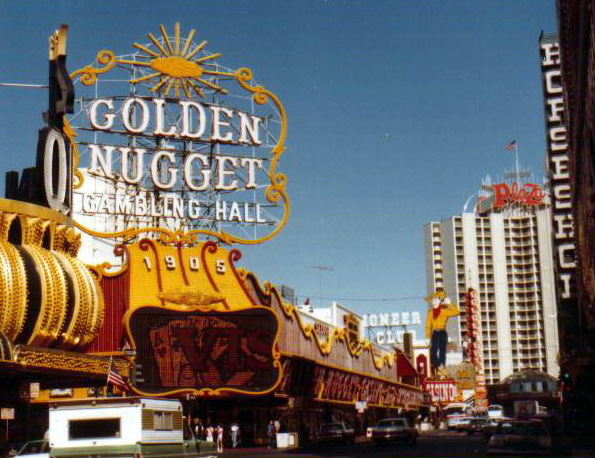
Fremont Street (1983), day view directed west

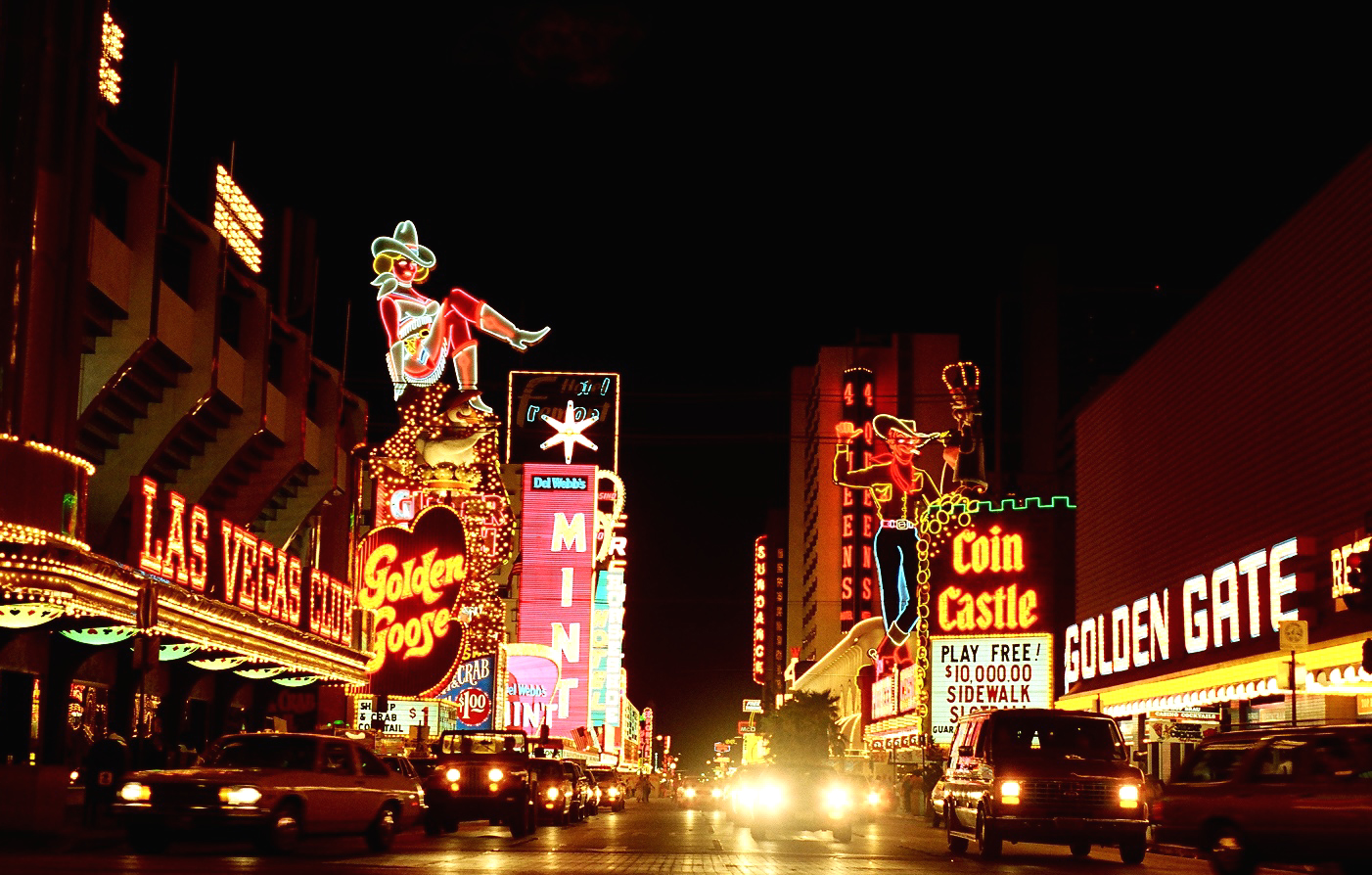
Fremont Street (1986), night view directed east

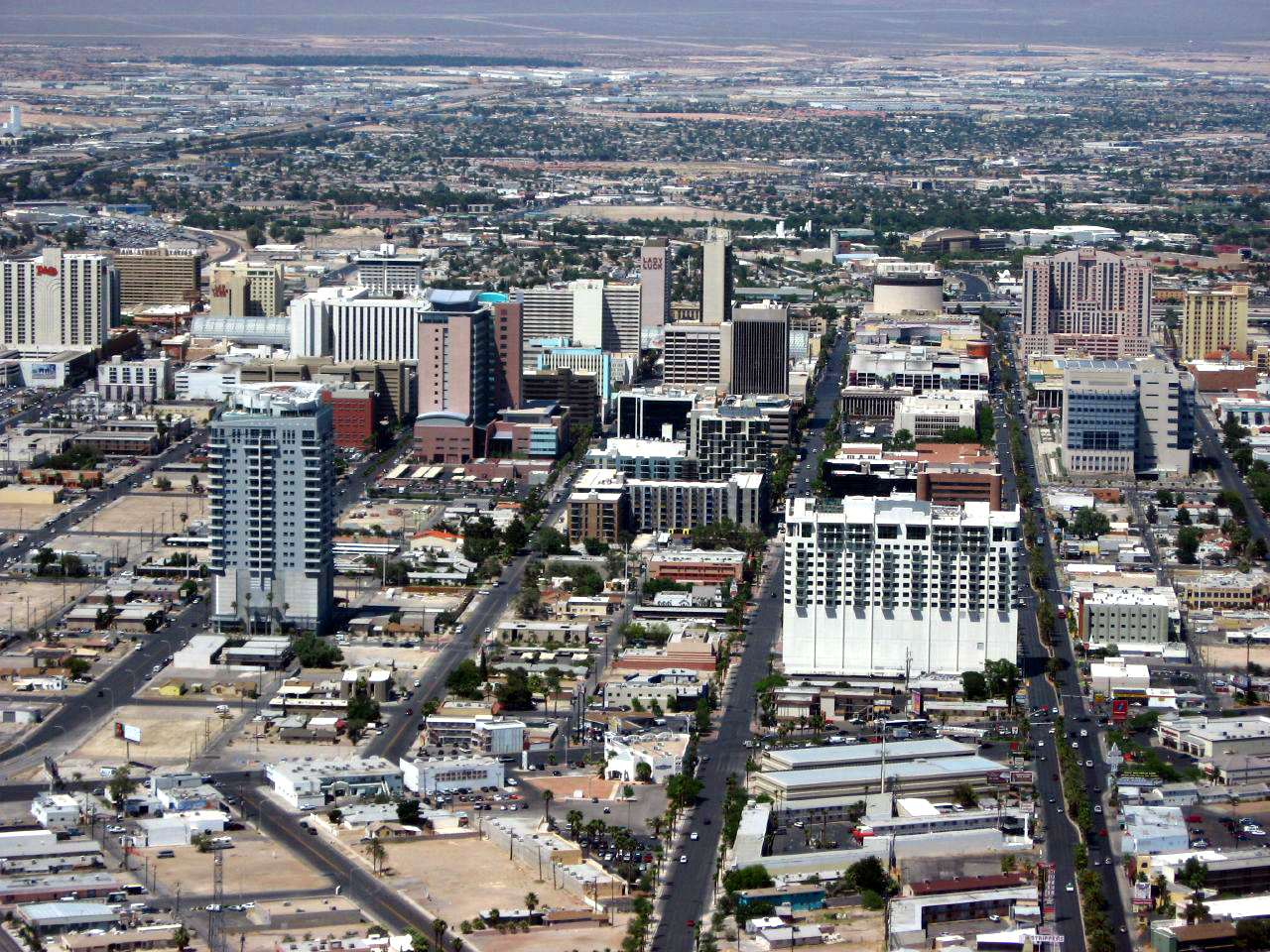
Downtown Las Vegas (2008), viewed north from The Strat casino tower

Key hotel developments serving tourists in Las Vegas included the El Cortez (1941) on Fremont and Last Frontier (1942) on U.S. Route 91, further south, later to be known as Las Vegas Boulevard/Strip. Following World War II, lavishly decorated hotels, gambling casinos and big-name entertainment became synonymous with Las Vegas. The first large casino in Las Vegas was built downtown, the Golden Nugget, completed in 1946.

In 1951, the first atomic bomb detonation at the Nevada Test Site, 65 miles (105 km) northwest of Las Vegas, occurred. City residents and visitors were able to witness the mushroom clouds until 1963, when the Limited Test Ban Treaty required that nuclear tests be moved underground.

Meanwhile, Downtown and the Strip began competing for tourists, with the famous Vegas Vic waving cowboy sign downtown (1951) being answered by the opening of the tallest building in Las Vegas, the nine-storey Riviera on the Strip; the Riviera was trumped by the twelve-storey Fremont Hotel and Casino (1956) downtown. By the late 1950s, most new casino-resorts were opening on the Strip, including the Dunes (1955), Tropicana (1957), Stardust (1958), Tallyho (1962), and Caesars Palace (1966), in comparison, competing contemporary developments downtown included The Mint (1957), Lady Luck (1964), and Four Queens (1966).

1955 also saw the opening of the Moulin Rouge Hotel just west of downtown, the first racially integrated casino-hotel in Las Vegas. Full desegregation of other Las Vegas properties followed in 1960, and during the 1960s, corporations and business powerhouses such as Howard Hughes were building and buying hotel-casino properties. Gambling was referred to as "gaming", which transitioned into legitimate business.

In 1989, entrepreneur Steve Wynn changed the face of the Las Vegas gaming industry by opening up The Mirage, the Las Vegas Strip's first mega-casino resort. This strengthened the pull of visitors away from the downtown area.

=== Fremont Street Experience ===
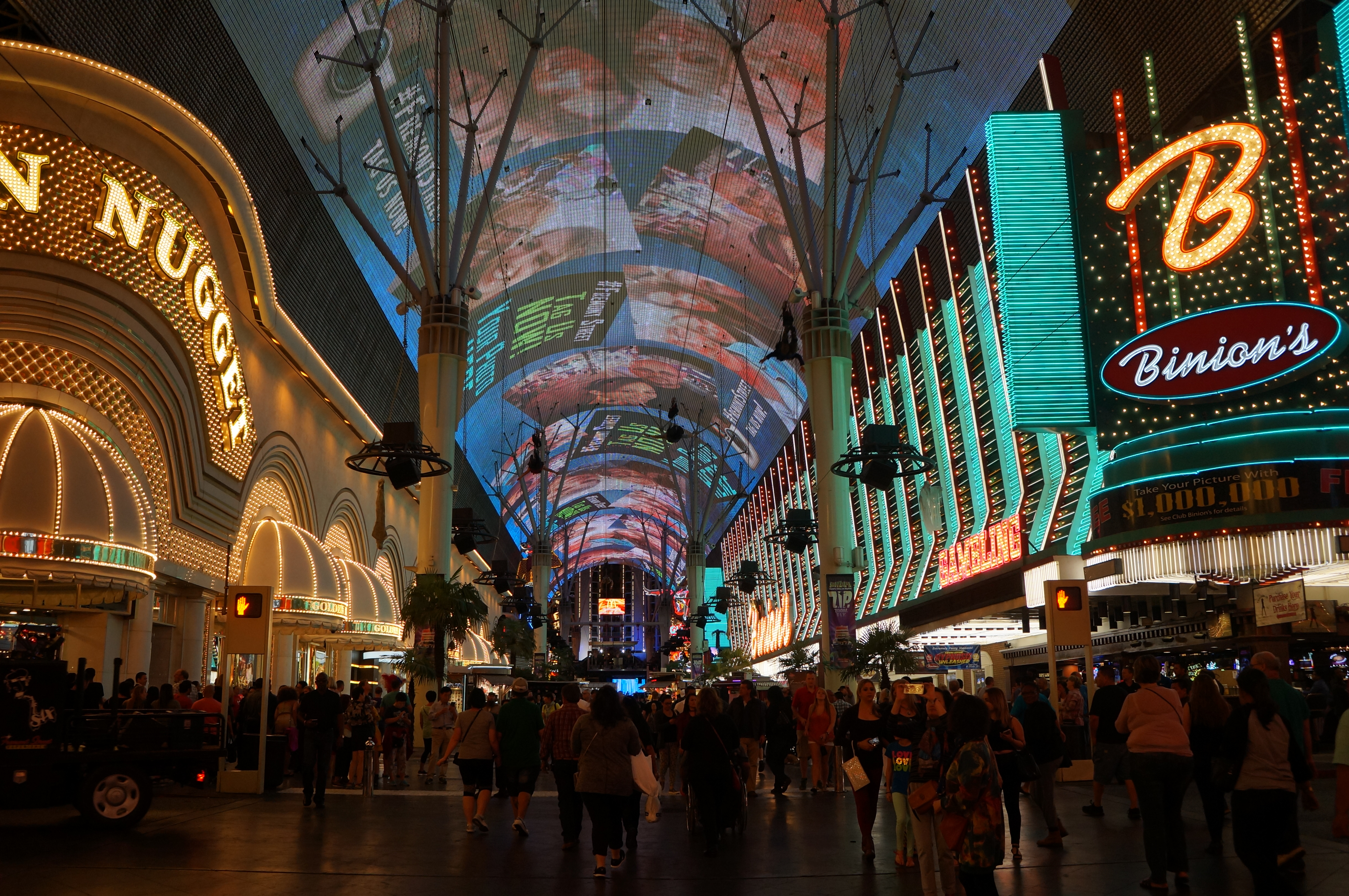
Casinos along Fremont Street at night with a light show displayed on the Fremont Street Experience canopy completed in 1995

In 1995, the Fremont Street Experience in Las Vegas's downtown area was opened. This canopied, five-block area features 24 million LED lights and 550,000 watts of sound from dusk until midnight during shows held on the top of each hour.

Due to years of revitalization efforts, 2012 was dubbed "The Year of Downtown". Projects worth hundreds of millions of dollars made their debut at this time. They included The Smith Center for the Performing Arts and Discovery Children's Museum, the Mob Museum, the Neon Museum, and a new Las Vegas City Hall complex.

In 2018, plans for a new downtown expo center were announced, replacing and expanding on space previously provided by the Cashman Center.

== Neighborhoods and attractions ==
Selected locations in Downtown Las Vegas
1 Fremont Street Experience / Downtown casinos
2 Fremont East Entertainment District
3 Arts District
4 Symphony Park
5 Medical District
6 Financial District

=== Fremont Street Casino District ===
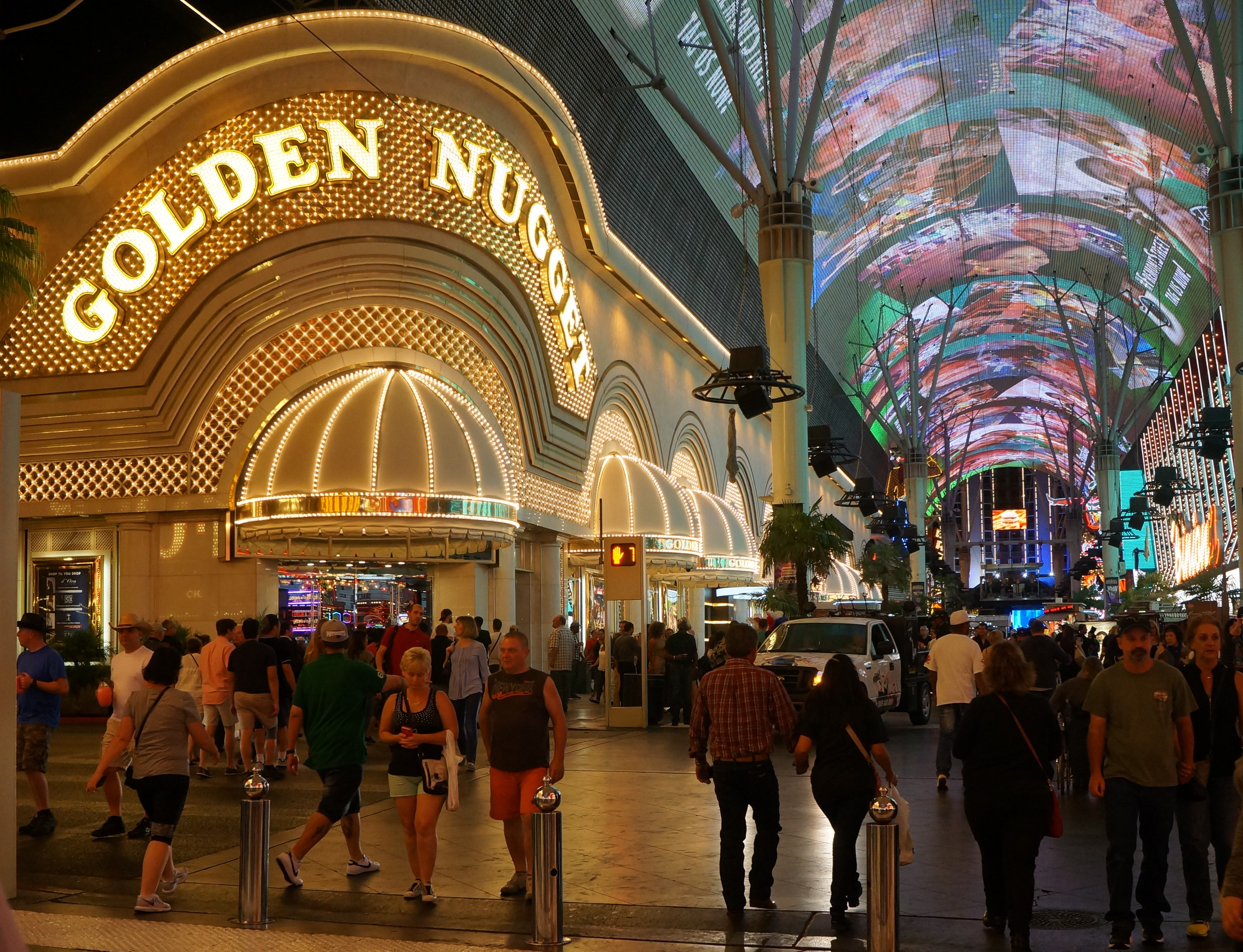
Golden Nugget and Fremont Street Experience (2016)

Fremont Street is home to most of downtown's hotels and casinos. These are the original casinos of Las Vegas, which existed before the more famous Las Vegas Strip. The Fremont Street Experience is a canopied street of the downtown area where casinos have been connected to the street and to each other in a unique visual manner. An audio-visual system consisting of more than 2 million lights and a sound system allows for nightly shows. A variety of events also occur at the Experience, including several live concerts. Various entertainment and dining options are also located in the area.

=== Fremont East Entertainment District ===
Property and business owners have been working to redevelop Fremont Street just east of the Fremont Street Experience. In 2002, the city of Las Vegas Redevelopment Agency joined with Fremont East property and business owners to create a business improvement district, as well as pay for a $5.5 million streetscape improvement. This area is called the Fremont East Entertainment District. It features an eclectic mix of bars, clubs and restaurants. Centered on Las Vegas Boulevard on Fremont Street, this three-block renovation includes pedestrian-friendly street redesign, landscaping and retro-looking neon signage.

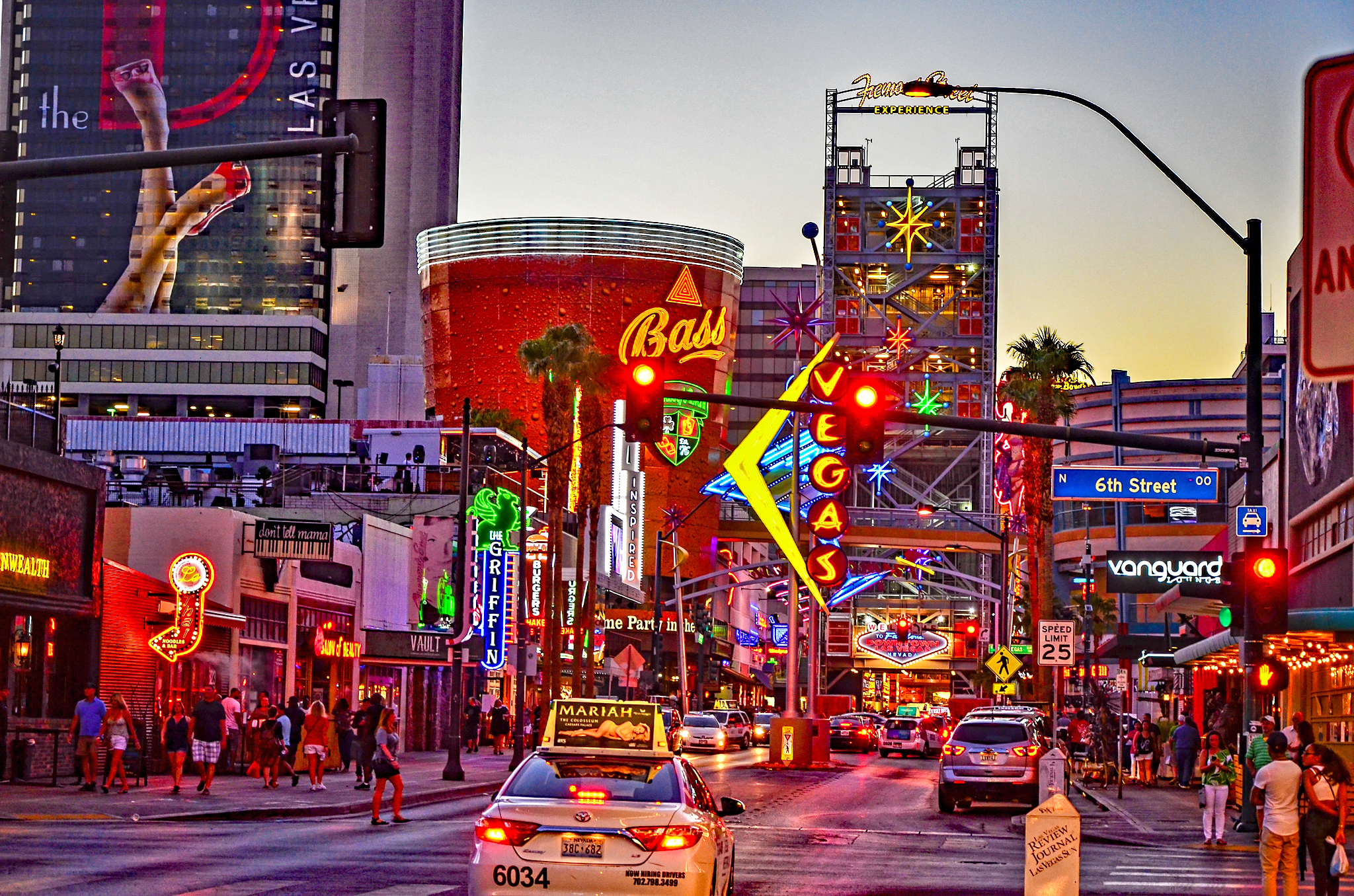
Fremont East (2016), looking towards FSE

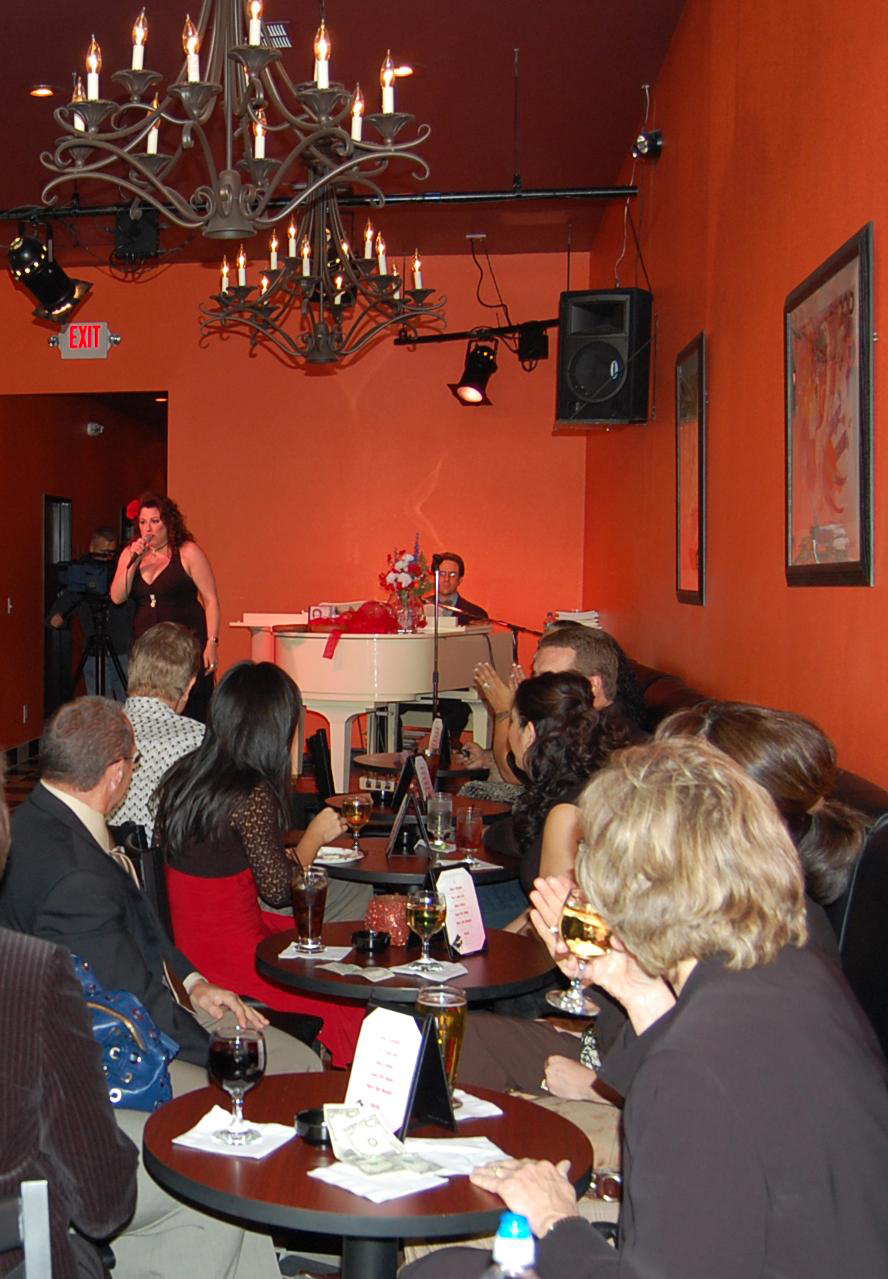
Fremont East bar

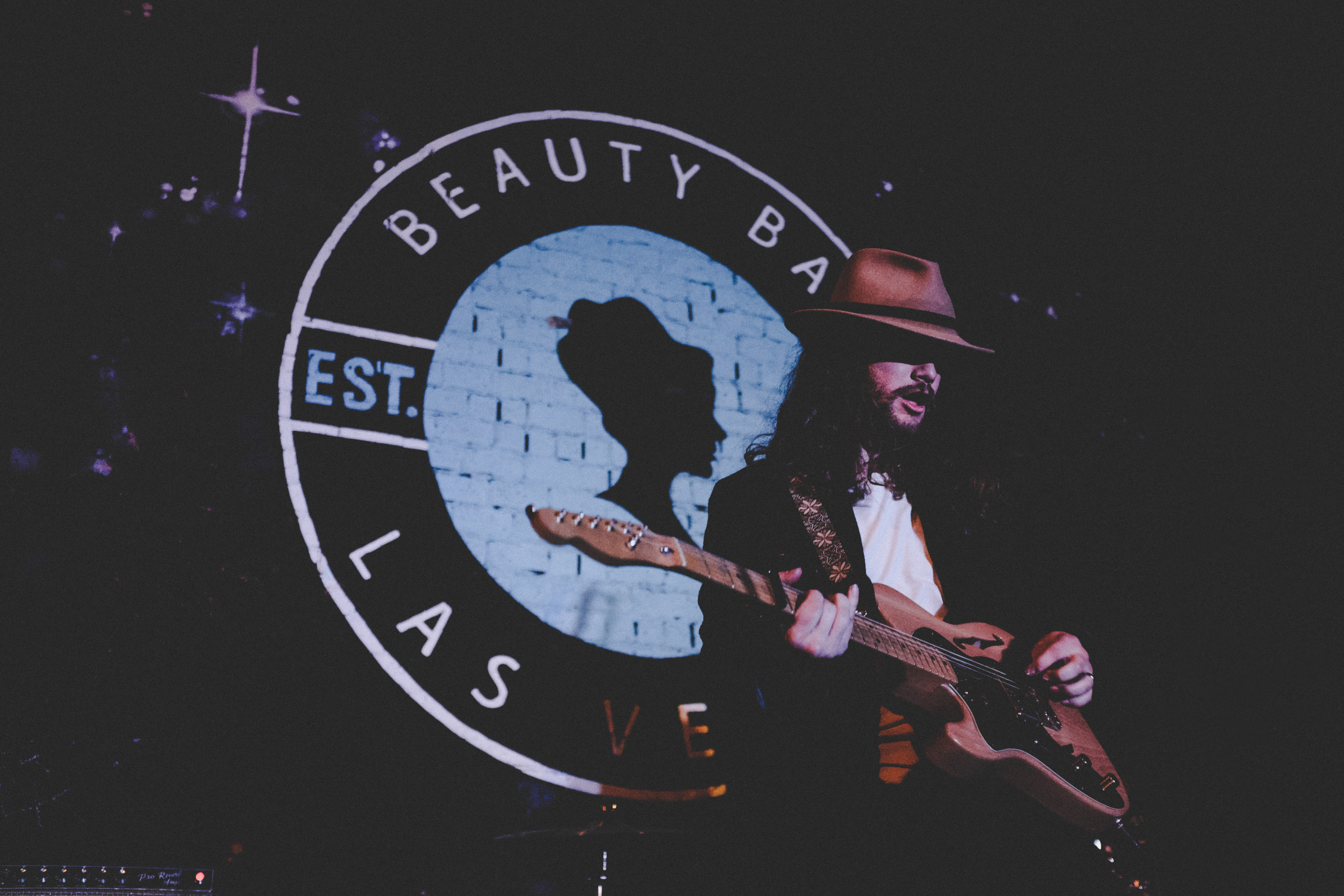
The former Beauty Bar on Fremont East

=== The Arts District ===
Officially called 18b, The Las Vegas Arts District – named after the 18 blocks the district originally encompassed – this area is home to the city's arts scene with its mix of art galleries, studios and stores. Many arts district stores offer antiques, vintage clothing, high fashion, and mid-20th century furniture/furnishings and other collectible items. Centered on Main Street and Charleston Boulevard, the area hosts the popular First Friday festival every month featuring art, music and other performances.

=== Symphony Park ===
Symphony Park is a mixed-use urban district being built on the land to the west of Fremont and Main streets. It will eventually feature a mix of retail, medical, hotel and residential developments. The city of Las Vegas is undertaking the development on 61 acres (25 ha) of land purchased from the Union Pacific Railroad in 1995. This is a major project for the Las Vegas Redevelopment Agency and the city. Projects that have been completed and are currently operating at Symphony Park are the Cleveland Clinic Lou Ruvo Center for Brain Health, The Smith Center for the Performing Arts and the Discovery Children's Museum.

=== Las Vegas Medical District ===
Business and government leaders have begun working on a plan to expand downtown's Las Vegas Medical District (LVMD) from its current 200 acres (81 ha) to at least 680 acres (280 ha). While currently offering the largest concentration of health-care services in the Las Vegas valley, an expanded district would allow for additional health-care services and opportunities. Areas for planned expansion include the Charleston Boulevard corridor to Valley View Boulevard, along Martin L. King Boulevard and in Symphony Park. The centerpiece of this expanded district will be the 260,000 square feet (24,000 m^{2}) UNLV School of Medicine, which will include an educational building and library. The school was granted preliminary accreditation in late 2016 and can begin accepting students for its 2017 charter class.

=== Financial District ===
Centered on Bonneville Avenue and Casino Center Boulevard, most of this area is filled with office and government buildings. With several court buildings located here, there are many judicial-related businesses, such as law firms in the immediate area. The financial district is home to the Las Vegas City Hall building, the Lloyd D. George U.S. Courthouse, and several bank buildings such as Bank of America. The Clark County Marriage Bureau is also located here at the Regional Justice Center.

=== Art and culture ===
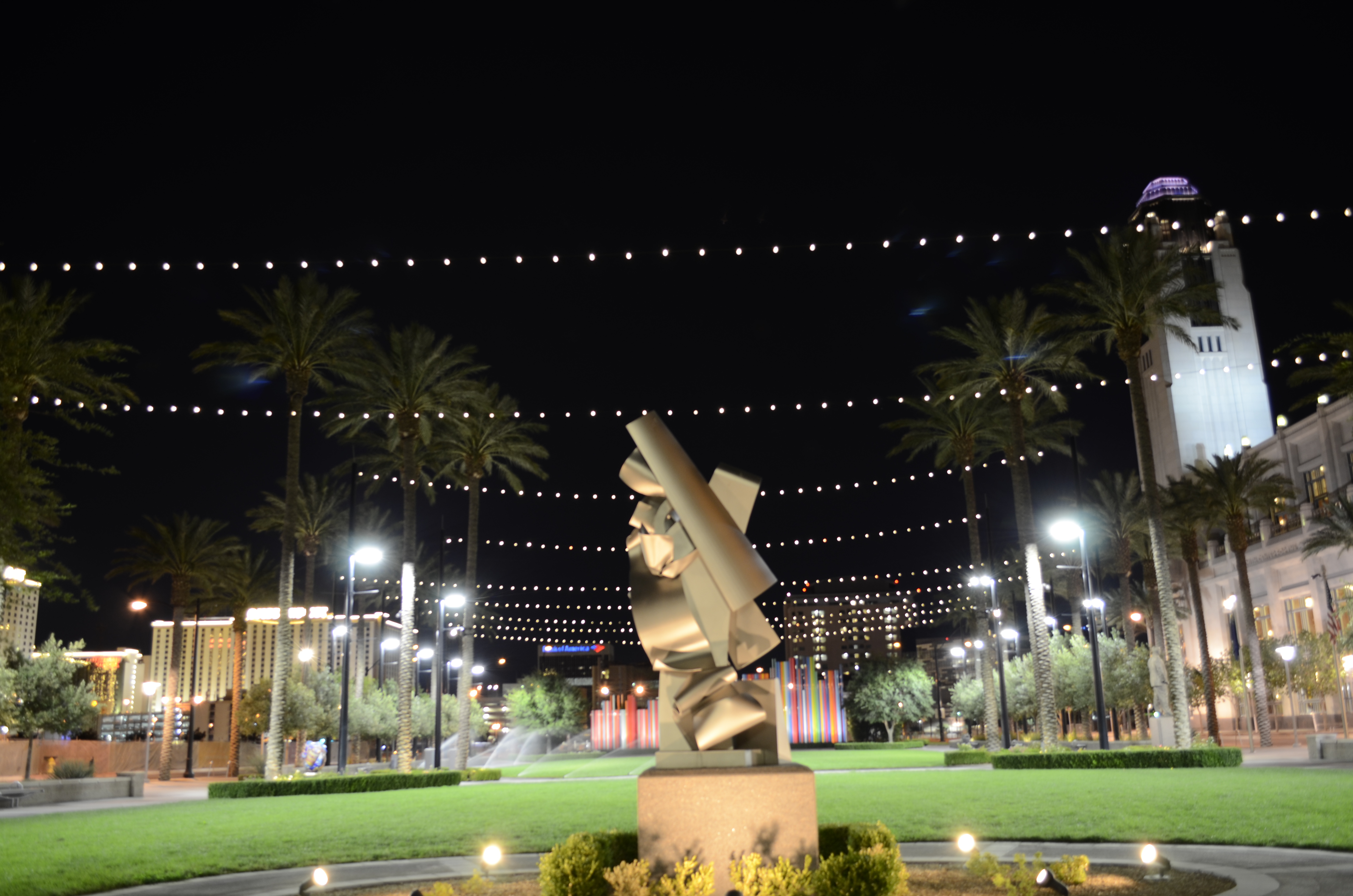
Symphony Park

Downtown is a hub for arts and culture in the metro area. The main venue for performing arts is the Art Deco-inspired Smith Center for the Performing Arts. In addition to The Smith Center and 18b, The Las Vegas Arts District, there are a number of educational facilities in the Cultural Corridor, located just north of the immediate downtown area. They include the Las Vegas Natural History Museum, the Neon Museum and Boneyard and the Old Las Vegas Mormon Fort State Historic Park. Also in this area are a number of neon signs from former Las Vegas casinos and landmarks, which have been restored and installed on several streets around downtown, as well as throughout the Fremont Street Experience. A famous neon icon of downtown Las Vegas is the Vegas Vic sign, also located at the Fremont Street Experience. Downtown also hosts the annual Life Is Beautiful Festival, a multi-day event that features music, art installations, and food experiences throughout the Fremont East area.

- The Smith Center for the Performing Arts
- The Writer's Block
- DISCOVERY Children's Museum
- Mob Museum
- Neon Museum
- Las Vegas Natural History Museum
- Old Las Vegas Mormon Fort State Historic Park
- "Cannabition" pop-up museum of marijuana (opening July 1, 2018 and only open to those 21 and over).

=== Retail ===
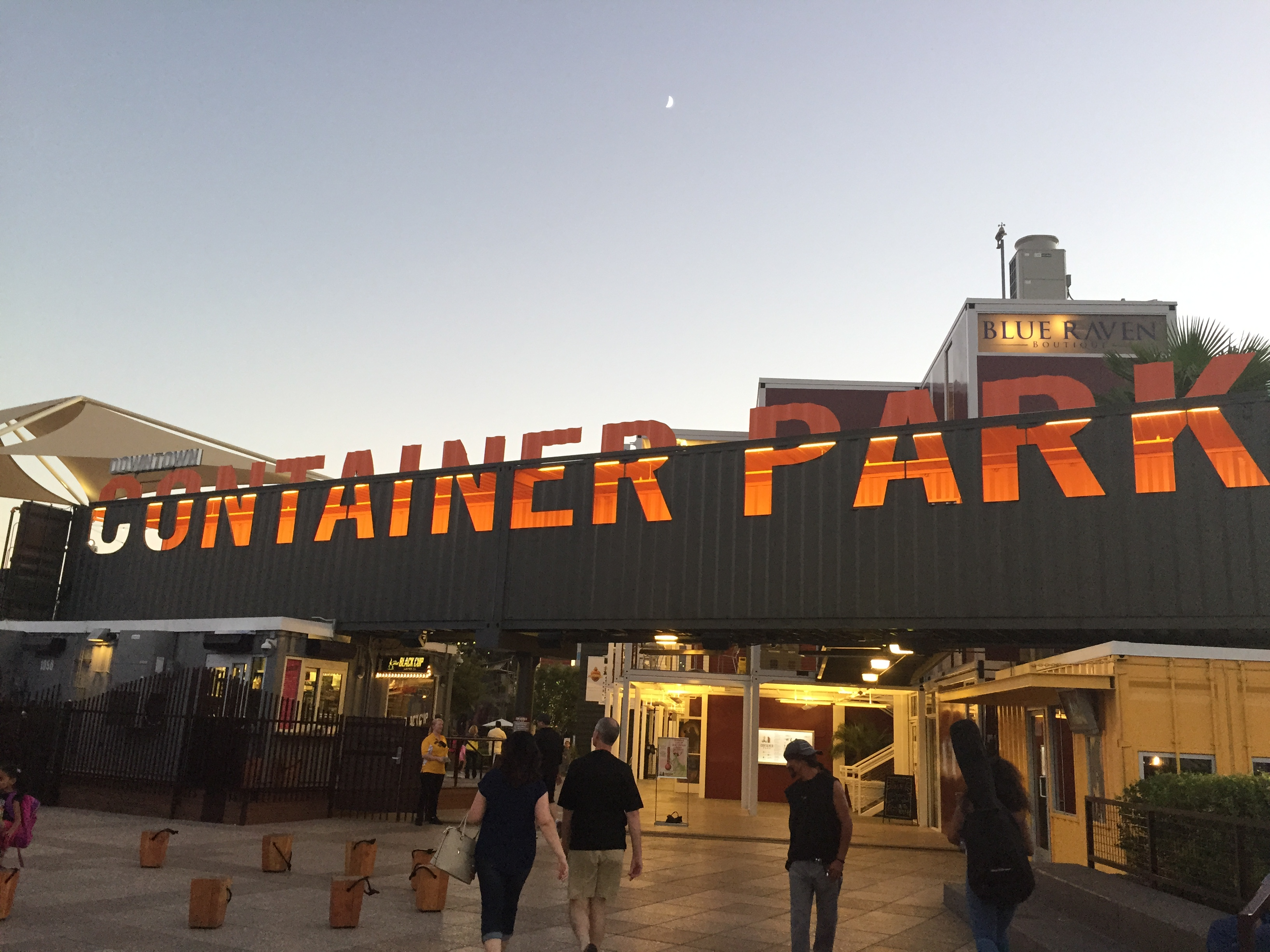
Container Park entrance

- Las Vegas North Premium Outlets
- Downtown Container Park
- Antique & Vintage stores

== Cityscape ==
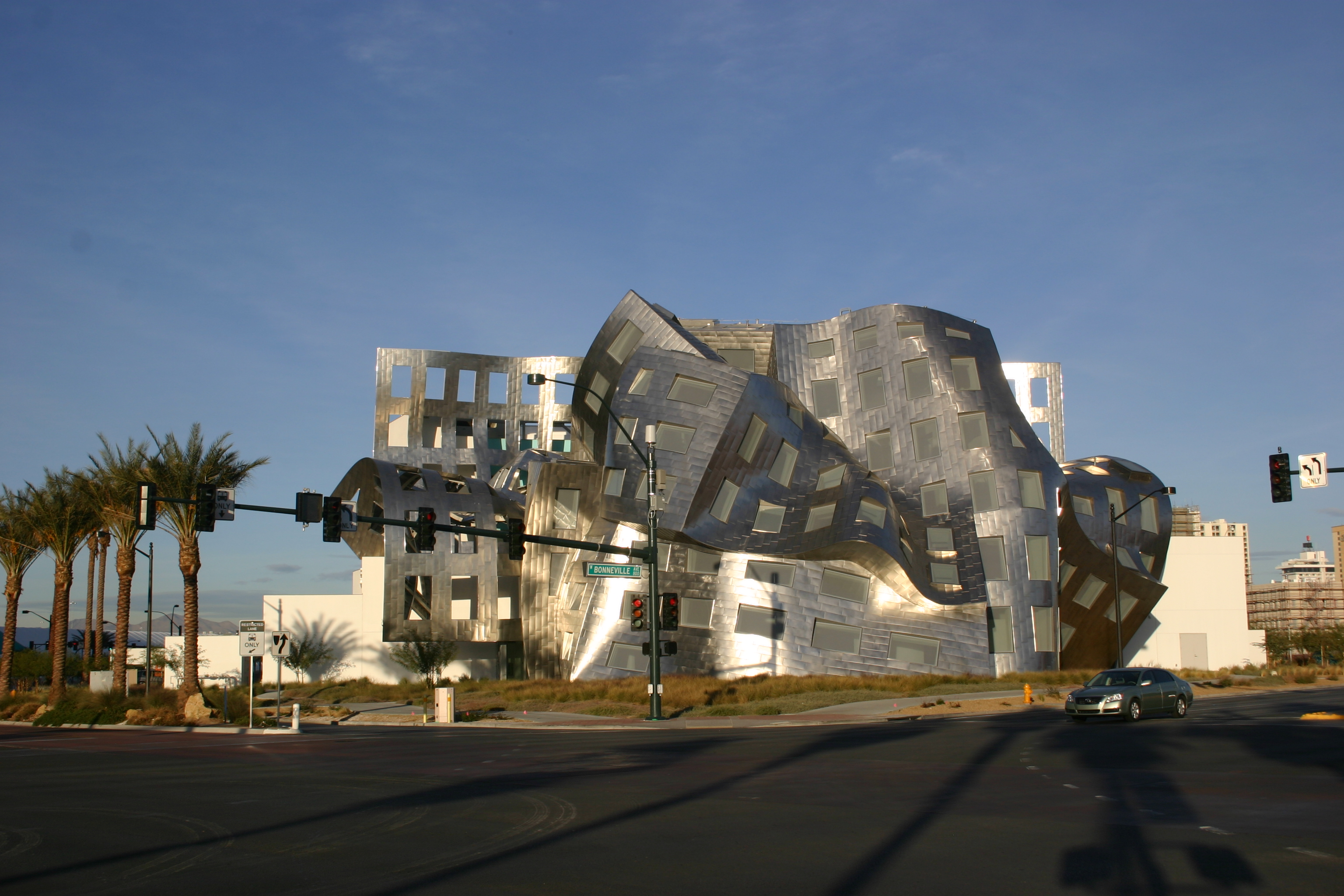
Cleveland Clinic Lou Ruvo Center for Brain Health

=== Architecture ===
Several buildings of architectural significance exist downtown, although being founded in 1905, Las Vegas lacks the number of historical buildings of older cities. Exceptions include the Historic Fifth Street School, built in 1936 in the Spanish-mission style and listed in the National Register of Historic Places. Also listed is the Las Vegas Post Office and Courthouse, which currently serves as home to The Mob Museum and is one of the few historical neoclassical buildings in the city. Built in 1930, the Las Vegas Academy of International Studies and Performing Arts is the city's best example of Art Deco architecture. The Morelli House, built in 1959, is a notable mid-century modern design. The building that formerly housed the Las Vegas City Hall, and now is home to the corporate headquarters for the online retailer Zappos.com, is a notable example of 1970s modern architecture.

As Las Vegas boomed, more recent buildings tended to take inspiration from a variety of styles. The Clark County Government Center has a red sandstone exterior invoking a desert motif. The Smith Center for the Performing Arts, opened in 2012, is a more modern example of Art Deco design. Architect Frank Gehry designed the building for the Cleveland Clinic Lou Ruvo Center for Brain Health building in deconstructionist style. It was completed in 2010.

=== Parks ===
- Donald W. Reynolds Symphony Park
- Lewis Avenue Pedestrian Corridor
- Heritage Park
- Old Las Vegas Mormon Fort State Historic Park
- Clark County Government Center Amphitheater
- Cashman Field Center

== Government ==
Downtown serves as a main center for government services in the Las Vegas Valley. Government offices for the city of Las Vegas and Clark County are located here, as well as the Las Vegas Metropolitan Police Department and several courts.

Some former government buildings have been turned into attractions, such as the old Las Vegas Post Office and Courthouse becoming the Mob Museum.

== Transportation ==
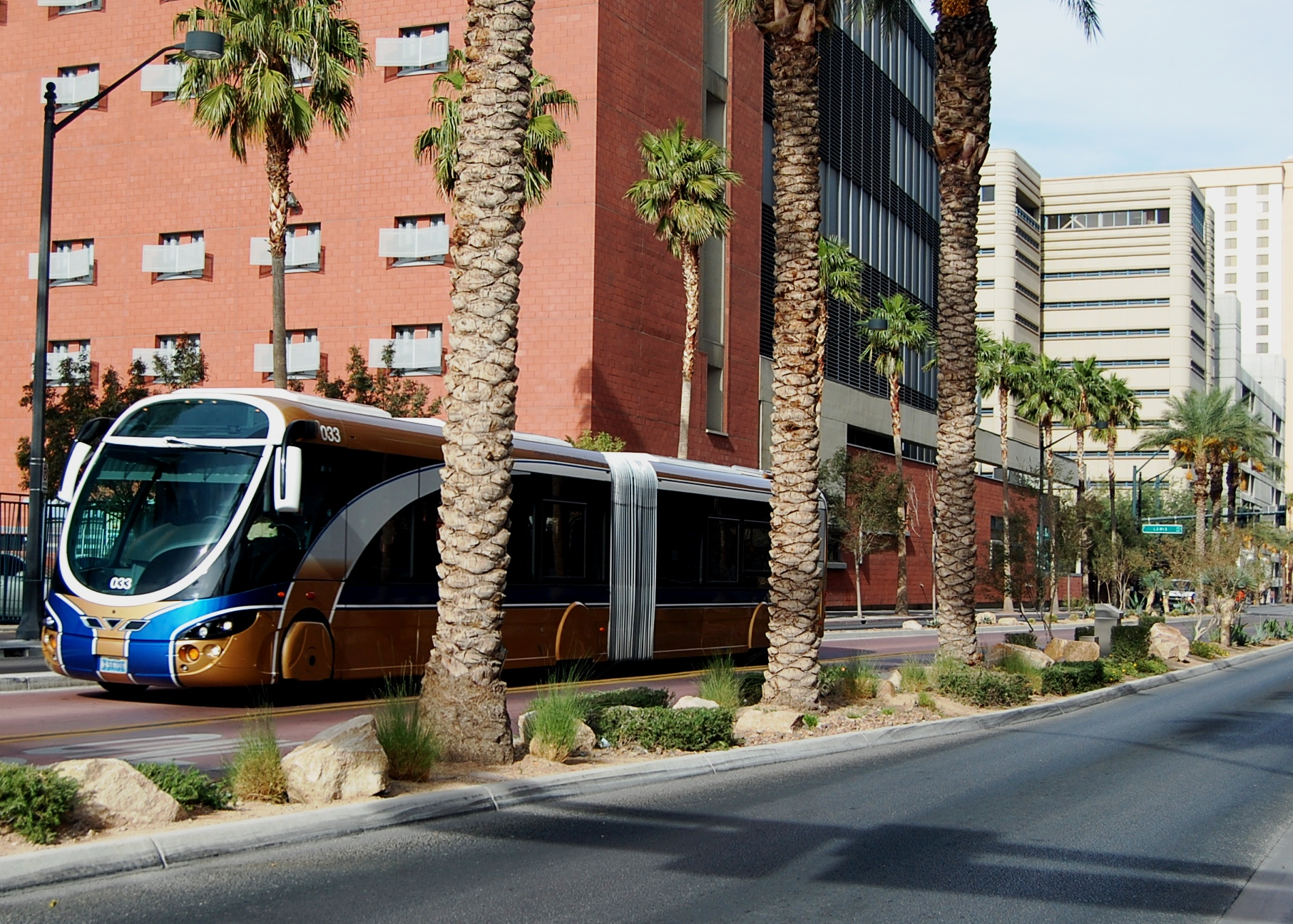
Regional Transportation Commission provides public transportation

Two major freeways—Interstate 15 and Interstate 11/U.S. Route 95—cross in downtown Las Vegas. RTC Transit is a public transportation system providing bus service throughout Las Vegas, including the downtown area.

A bus rapid transit link in Las Vegas called the Strip & Downtown Express (previously ACE Gold Line) with limited stops and frequent service was launched in March 2010. It connects downtown Las Vegas, the Strip and the Las Vegas Convention Center. It stops at the Bonneville Transit Center. Completed in 2012, the transit terminal serves as a central transfer point for downtown and features 16 vehicle bays for buses and 100 bike racks.

The Downtown Loop is a free shuttle servicing many attractions in downtown Las Vegas. The Loop runs continuously during operating hours and arrives at each stop every 20 minutes. The hours of operation are Monday through Thursday: 11:30 a.m. to 8:30 p.m.; Friday through Saturday: 3 p.m. to 12 a.m.; Sunday: 10 a.m. to 7 p.m.

The AAA Free Self-Driving Shuttle is a pilot program that provides rides in the Fremont East Entertainment District Nov 2017 – Nov 2018. The pilot program is a partnership with Keolis, the city of Las Vegas, and the Regional Transportation Commission of Southern Nevada. The shuttle runs Tuesday – Sunday 4:30pm – 8:30pm, with the main station stop at the Downtown Container Park. Shuttle service is suspended during the month of August.

== Economy ==
The economy of downtown Las Vegas has been primarily based on gambling and entertainment, as is the case in the greater Las Vegas Valley. However, the smaller downtown casinos earn revenues that pale in comparison to the mega resorts on the Las Vegas Strip further south. As of 2014, there have been major renovations of several downtown resorts such as The Plaza, Golden Gate Hotel, Golden Nugget, El Cortez Hotel & Casino, the D and the Downtown Grand.

Downtown Las Vegas also houses some corporate offices, as well as the World Market Center Las Vegas, a frequent host of trade shows and conventions. Recently, the opening of the Cleveland Clinic Lou Ruvo Center for Brain Health and the arrival of the new Zappos headquarters downtown have started to attract new medical and technology-oriented businesses to the area.

=== Revitalization ===
The downtown area in recent decades has played second fiddle to the larger and more famous Las Vegas Strip, which is located a few miles to the south. The city has been working on revitalization efforts to entice more visitors and residents to the downtown area.

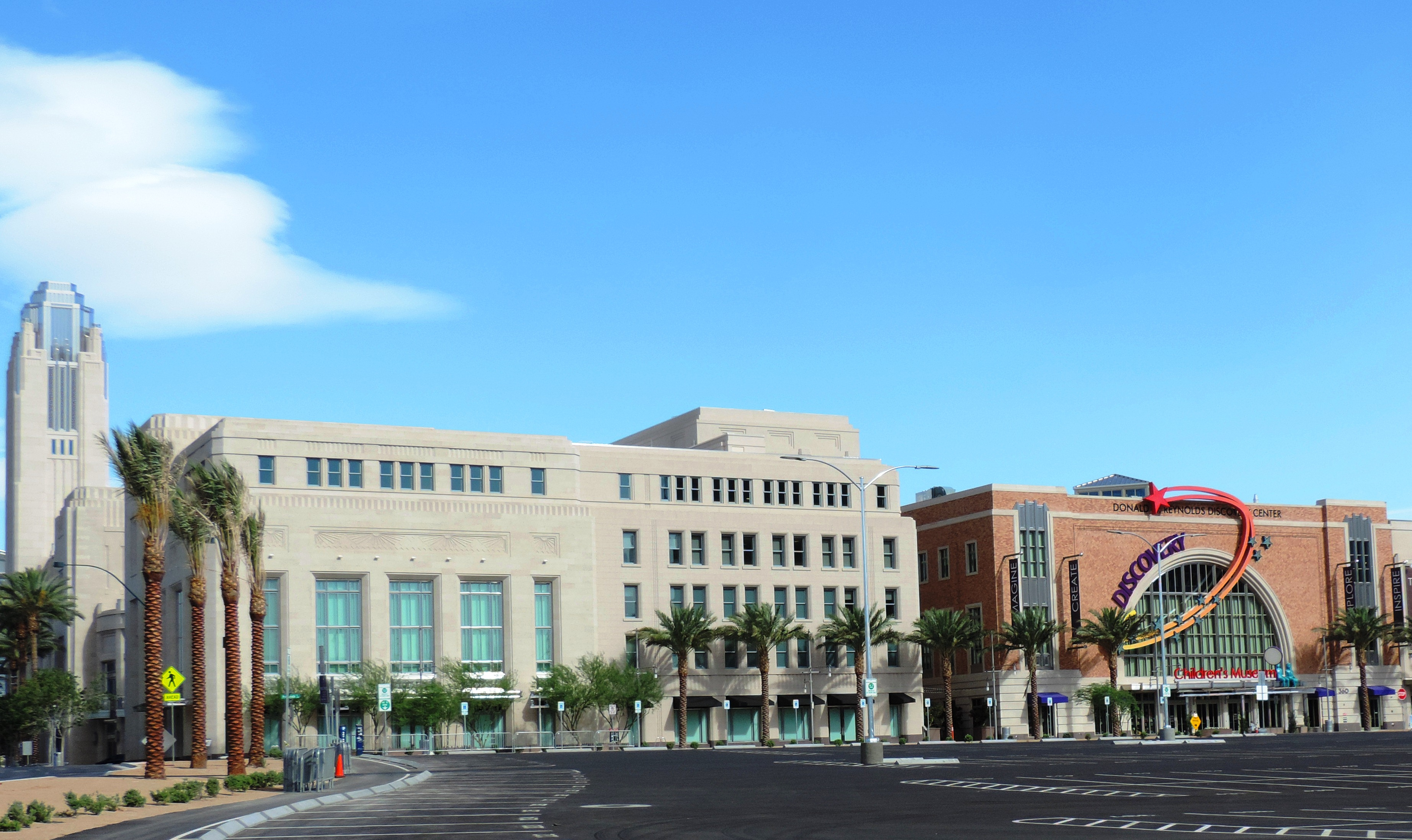
The Smith Center for the Performing Arts

World Market Center Las Vegas consists of three giant buildings, with a total of 5,100,000 square feet (470,000 m^{2}), in a facility designed by Jon Jerde. It is home to semiannual trade shows for the furniture and furnishing industries. This is one of several entities that are helping to diversify downtown Las Vegas's economy and job base.

The square footage of World Market Center Las Vegas is greater than both the Willis Tower in Chicago and the Empire State Building in New York City.

The city is also working to attract events to the downtown area. Recently held events include Helldorado and the Life is Beautiful festival.

In 2012 several new downtown projects were completed. The Smith Center for the Performing Arts, the new Mob Museum and a new City Hall building opened. The Discovery Children's Museum opened next door to The Smith Center in 2013.

The Las Vegas City Hall now operates out of a new building, which, along with the Bonneville Transit center, can serve as an anchor tenant for new development along Main Street. In addition, Main and Commerce streets in downtown Las Vegas are undergoing major beautification efforts, which started in mid-2014.

Online retailer Zappos made major renovations to the old Las Vegas City Hall and moved into the building in late 2013, which now houses its corporate headquarters. Zappos CEO Tony Hsieh had taken a personal, as well as a professional, interest in the urban area and contributed $350 million of his personal wealth toward a multifaceted revitalization effort called the Downtown Project, with businesses like The Writer's Block included among its investments.

== Film and media history ==
- The 1971 James Bond film Diamonds Are Forever featured a chase scene in which James Bond, running from Las Vegas police, side-rolls a car through an alley exiting onto Fremont Street.
- The 1987 music video for the song "I Still Haven't Found What I'm Looking For" by U2 was filmed on Fremont Street and featured the band members wandering around, while The Edge played an acoustic guitar.
- Very Bad Things (1998) featured Fremont Street in the movie.
- Honey, I Blew Up the Kid (1992) prominently featured Fremont Street in the movie.
- Cool World (1992) showed all the animation coming out of the Plaza hotel and going down Fremont Street.
- In 1994, Glitter Gulch was featured prominently in the TV Miniseries The Stand.
- The 1997 comedy Vegas Vacation includes a few scenes on Fremont Street.
- In the 2004 movie Dodgeball: A True Underdog Story, Steve the Pirate is seen along the Plaza near the Fremont Street Experience.
- In a 2005 release, Panic! at the Disco released a song about cheap motels on Fremont Street called "Build God, Then We'll Talk".
- The 2007 film Next, has Nicolas Cage's character entering the Golden Nugget from the Fremont Street Experience.
- Ice Cube's music video for "Chrome and Paint" took place on Fremont Street, with Ice Cube in a lowrider.
- In the video game, Tom Clancy's Rainbow Six: Vegas, Logan Keller, and his teammates Jung and Michael, infiltrate Fremont Street to find a news van, which they find by going through the maintenance tunnels under the "Stocco Casino".
- Heavily referenced in the Tom Waits song "Mr. Siegal".
- Featured at the beginning of the TV Series CSI season 7 finale episode 24.
- Featured in the opening credits of the TV series Vega$.
- Magician and illusionist Criss Angel has done many demonstrations and TV specials there.
- The reality television series Pawn Stars is filmed at the Gold & Silver Pawn Shop located on Las Vegas Boulevard, which features other prominent members of the downtown community, most notably Jesse Amoroso from Cowtown Guitars who appears as a reoccurring guitar expert on the show.
- The Weeknd's After Hours (2020) short film was shot into various parts of Downtown Las Vegas.
