= Discovery Children's Museum =

DISCOVERY Children's Museum
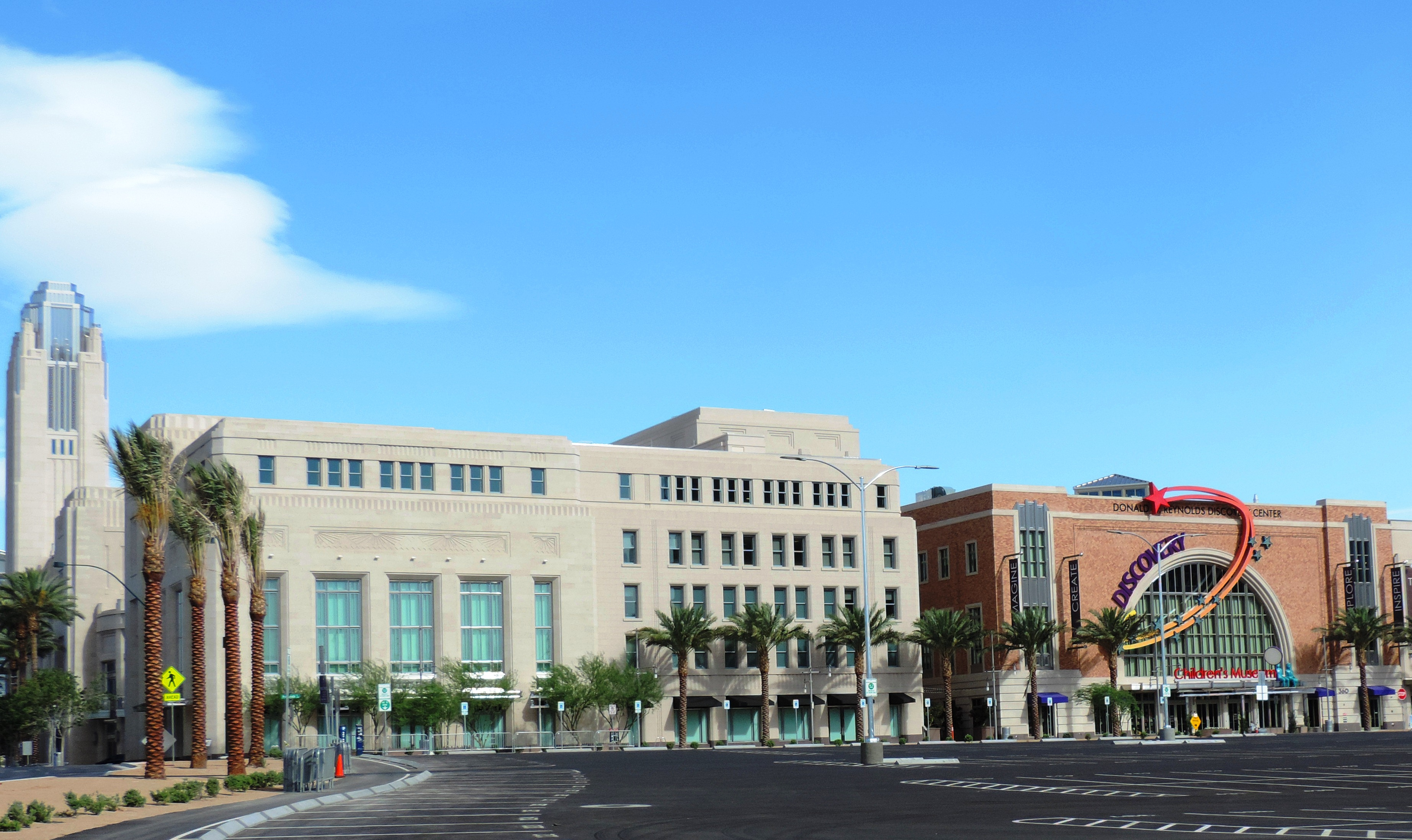
- DISCOVERY Children's Museum & The Smith Center for the Performing Arts
- Established: 1984
- Location: Las Vegas, Nevada
- Coordinates: 36°10′8″N 115°9′9″W
- Type: Children's museum
- Public transit access: Yes
- Website: http://www.discoverykidslv.org/

DISCOVERY Children's Museum is a nonprofit children's museum in Las Vegas, Nevada. Formerly known as Lied Discovery Children's museum, this 58,000-square-foot (5,400 m^{2}), three-story space is now located adjacent to The Smith Center in Downtown Las Vegas. The Museum sees roughly 250,000 visitors each year.

== History ==
The DISCOVERY Children's Museum was founded by Robin Greenspun and Mark Tratos in 1984. The pair arranged a partnership between the Junior League of Las Vegas and the Allied Arts Council to fund a much-needed nonprofit educational institution in the Las Vegas Valley. In 1985, a bond issued to authorize the building of the Las Vegas-Clark County Library and Lied Discovery Children's Museum, which opened its doors on September 9, 1990.

=== Relocation ===
In 2010 the museum announced plans to construct and occupy a new home and larger home in Symphony Park. The total for the Donald W. Reynolds Discovery Center project was $50 million. In August 2010, the Donald W. Reynolds Foundation announced a gift to The Smith Center to pay for the completion of its block in Symphony Park. $43 million of that gift was used to build the Donald W. Reynolds Discovery Center. The museum raised the remaining $7 million needed to complete the project. The new museum opened on March 9, 2013.
