= Las Vegas Redevelopment Agency =

Las Vegas Redevelopment Agency is a redevelopment agency whose goal is to work in concert with the community and private sector to revitalize the City of Las Vegas.

== History ==
The city of Las Vegas Redevelopment Agency (RDA) was created in 1986 by the Nevada Legislature to help revitalize downtown Las Vegas. Although the RDA is legally a separate entity from the city, city council members sit on its board and approve projects, contracts and incentive programs.

The city of Las Vegas currently has two designated redevelopment areas. Redevelopment Area 1 encompasses 4,336 acres. The area roughly includes the greater downtown Las Vegas area east of I-15, south of Washington Avenue, north of Sahara Avenue and west of Maryland Parkway. It also includes the Charleston Boulevard, Martin L. King Boulevard and Eastern Avenue corridors.

Redevelopment Area 2, consisting of approximately 1,049 acres, covers Sahara Avenue from I-15 to Decatur Boulevard, Charleston Boulevard from Rancho Drive to Rainbow Boulevard, and Decatur Boulevard from Sahara Avenue to U.S. 95.

An RDA designation gives the Las Vegas Redevelopment Agency the powers to redevelop, rehabilitate and revitalize an area. This designation also allows the Redevelopment Agency to provide qualified owners/operators with certain business incentives.

The RDA can aid qualifying companies located within the Redevelopment Areas with federal New Markets Tax Credits funding, Tax Increment Financing, Visual Improvement Program matching grant funds and the Downtown Las Vegas Retail Assistance Program.

The RDA promotes the redevelopment of downtown Las Vegas and surrounding older commercial districts by working with developers, property owners and the community to accomplish beneficial revitalization efforts, create jobs and eliminate urban decay. The RDA coordinates with the city of Las Vegas Economic and Urban Development Department (EUD) on day-to-day operations, development, job creation and long-term strategic goals.

The agency's major projects have included Symphony Park, a new headquarters location for Zappos.com, development of the Fremont East Entertainment District, the Urban Chamber of Commerce Business Development Center, the Museum of Organized Crime and Law Enforcement and the new Las Vegas City Hall public-private, mixed-use complex.
