= Symphony Park =

- District of Las Vegas
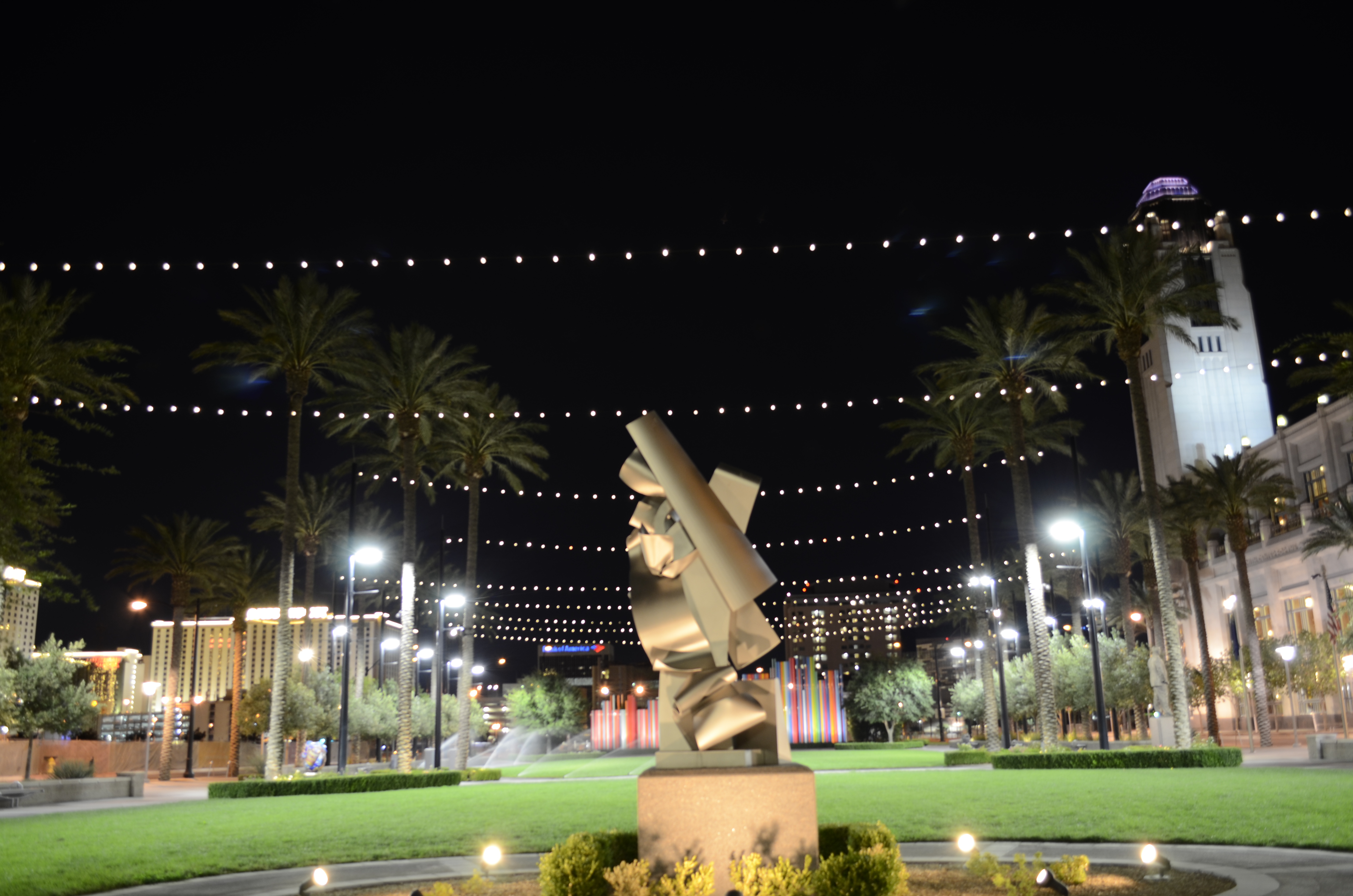
- Symphony Park in 2016

- Location within Downtown Las Vegas Location within Nevada
- Coordinates: 36°10′13″N 115°9′6″W
- Country: United States
- State: Nevada
- County: Clark County
- City: Las Vegas, Nevada
- Established: 2000
- Founder: Las Vegas Redevelopment Agency
- Website: downtown.vegas/work/symphony-park/

Symphony Park is a 61-acre (25 ha) site located in downtown Las Vegas. Once housing a Union Pacific rail yard, Symphony Park is being master developed for mixed-use by the city of Las Vegas, which is also the landowner. Symphony Park is home to the Cleveland Clinic Lou Ruvo Center for Brain Health, Smith Center for the Performing Arts and the Discovery Children's Museum. In 2024, plans were announced for the new Las Vegas Museum of Art, which will occupy two acres of land on the east side of Symphony Park upon its projected completion in 2028.

== Overview ==
Notable features of Symphony Park include:

- Cleveland Clinic Lou Ruvo Center for Brain Health, an institution dedicated to researching and finding cures for brain-related diseases.
- Smith Center for the Performing Arts, offering a blend of performances including dance, music and Broadway shows. It is home to resident companies, Nevada Ballet Theater and the Las Vegas Philharmonic Orchestra, and also houses the Las Vegas Metro Chamber of Commerce. The Smith Center includes a 2,050-seat main hall, a 300-seat Cabaret Jazz club that overlooks a park and the 200-seat Troesh Studio Theatre.
- Discovery Children's Museum, a three-story facility focusing on science and nature, art and culture, and early childhood development with 26,000 square feet (2,400 m^{2}) of interactive, hands-on exhibits. The museum includes nine interactive galleries featuring traveling exhibitions, daily programs, demonstrations and cultural programming.

In 2024, Las Vegas mayor Carolyn Goodman announced plans for the new Las Vegas Museum of Art, which is to be constructed on two acres on the east side of Symphony Park. The museum will exist in a partnership with the Los Angeles County Museum of Art co-chaired by Las Vegas philanthropist Elaine Wynn. Pritzker Prize laureate Diébédo Francis Kéré was chosen to lead the museum's design.

Symphony Park's neighbors include the 5,100,000-square-foot (470,000 m^{2}) World Market Center Las Vegas, the 175-store Las Vegas North Premium Outlets and the multistory Clark County Government Center.

Symphony Park is the only project in the state of Nevada to be accepted into a national pilot program for green neighborhood developments. Symphony Park was awarded gold certification under stage 2 of the U.S. Green Building Council’s Leadership in Energy and Environmental Design for Neighborhood Development. (LEED®-ND)

== History ==
=== Early timeline ===
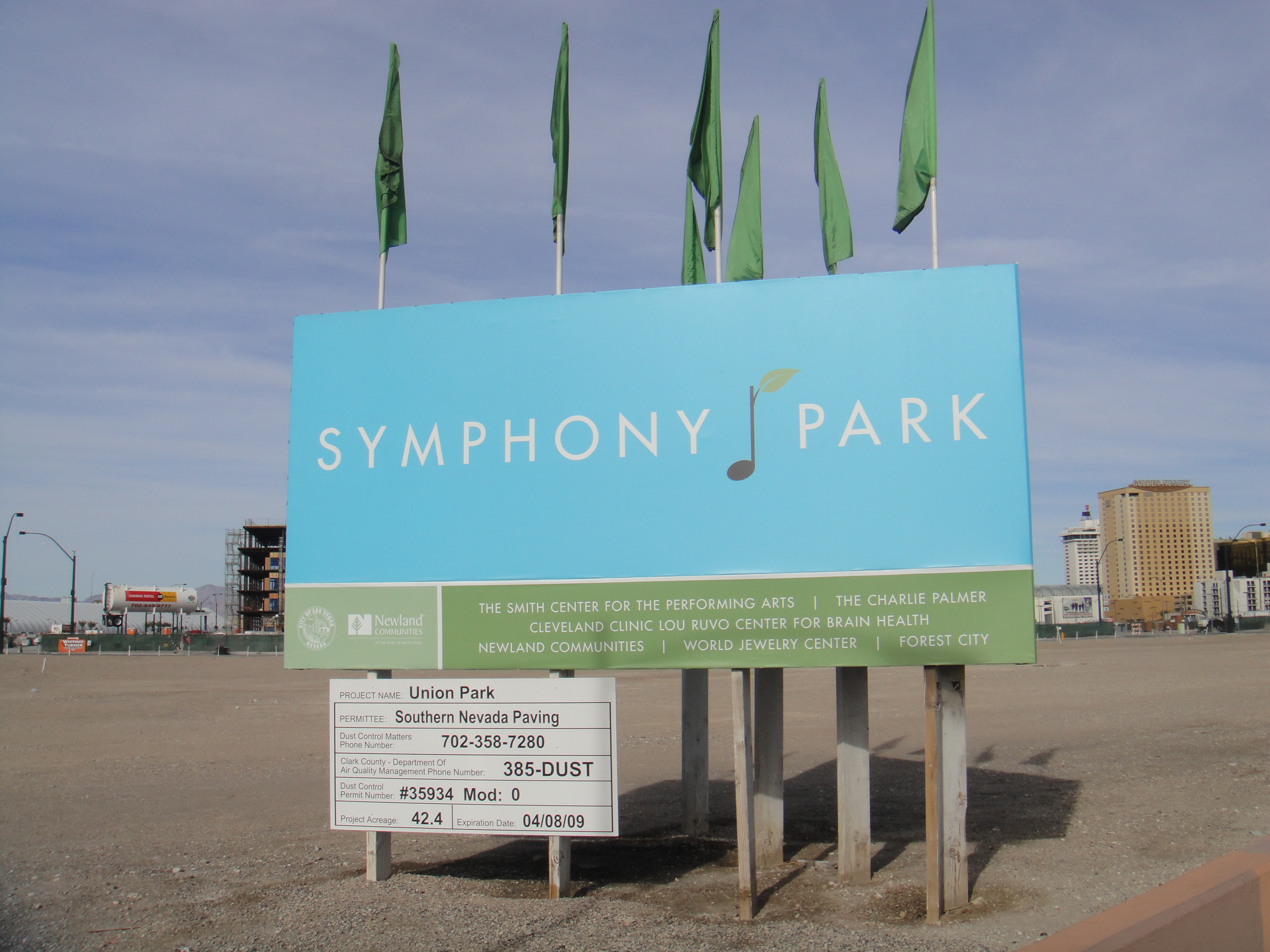
Symphony Park project sign (2010)

July 19, 2000 City Council authorizes City staff to enter into negotiations with Shopco Advisory Group (representing Lehman Brothers) for the purchase of the 61-acre (25 ha) parcel; City willing to exchange 98 acres in the Las Vegas Technology Center plus $2 million.

September 25, 2000 Environmental Risk Management Report completed by Converse Consultants.

October 4, 2000 City Council holds the agreement that allows the City to exchange 99 acres (40 ha) in the Las Vegas Technology Park plus $2 million for the 61.5 acres (24.9 ha).

October 18, 2000 City Council approves the agreement between PAMI and the City of Las Vegas for the acquisition of the 61.5-acre (24.9 ha) parcel located at Grand Central Parkway and Bonneville.

September 2001 Risk-Based Evaluation completed – Converse Consultants; after completion of the market analysis, second risk-based evaluation completed to determine extent of future remediation requirements for proposed uses of hospital, residential and retail.

January 2003 City Council approves City Parkway to act as master developer.

2004 The project, frequently referred to as the "61 acres", is officially named Union Park.

January 2005 Mayor announces gift of land on site to Ruvo for Alzheimer's Clinic ($1.4 million or 2 acres (0.81 ha)).

March 2005 Las Vegas Performing Arts Center Foundation enters into agreement with Donald W. Reynolds Foundation for $45 million endowment plus $5 million grant.

October 2005 The Related Companies pulls out of a deal to develop office space and residential high-rises in Union Park.

December 2005 City enters into agreement with Performing Arts Center Foundation.

November 2006 City Council approves Design Standards and Master Parcel Plan.

August 2007 Only project in Nevada accepted into Leadership in Energy and Environmental Design for Neighborhood Development (LEED®-ND) pilot program developed by the U.S. Green Building Council.

October 2007 The Smith Center for the Performing Arts receives $100 million challenge grant from the Donald W. Reynolds Foundation.

November 2007 City Council approves a $1.71 million agreement with The Whiting-Turner Contracting Company to handle pre-construction services for The Smith Center For The Performing Arts.

July 2008 Awarded Gold certification status under stage 2 by the U.S. Green Building Council (USGBC), through their Leadership in Energy and Environmental Design for Neighborhood Development (LEED®-ND) green building rating system.

=== Developments ===
In February 2006, the city entered into an agreement with Lou Ruvo Brain Institute. The Lou Ruvo Center for Brain Health started construction in 2007, and began seeing patients two years later. Chef Charlie Palmer also planned to open a hotel in Union Park, although the project has been delayed several times.

In May 2009, the city council approved a name change from Union Park to Symphony Park to reflect the significant role that the project would play as a cultural and artistic center. Construction also began on the Smith Center for the Performing Arts, which opened in March 2012. The Discovery Children's Museum relocated to Symphony Park one year later.

Otherwise, little development had taken place up to that point, with 90 percent of the property still vacant. The slow rate of development was blamed on the Great Recession. The Parc Haven luxury apartment complex opened in May 2021, with 290 units. Another apartment project began construction in 2023. It includes the five-story Symphony Park II, and the 22-story Symphony Park III, both expected to be finished in 2025.

In January 2024, construction began on a five-story building that will house two Marriott hotel brands, AC Hotels and Element, with a total of 441 rooms. It is scheduled to open in late 2025.

A mixed-use project, known as Origin, will occupy six acres and include a 32-story condo building known as Cello Tower, featuring 240 units. Construction is scheduled to begin in 2024 and conclude two years later.

Three multi-family developments, Auric, Bria, and Capella, executed by KTGY's Dallas Studio (formerly known as GDA Architects, LLC. ) bring luxury and upscale living to Symphony Park.

== Proposed downtown Las Vegas arena ==
In 2012, prior to the construction and opening of T-Mobile Arena, Las Vegas officials envisioned a $400 million arena with about 20,000 seats, large enough to house an NBA team, with additional retail throughout. It would have gone on the northeastern edge of Symphony Park, close to the Smith Center for the Performing Arts. The project was envisioned to be a private/public partnership between the city of Las Vegas and the Cordish Cos.

The project later morphed into a soccer stadium to attempt to attract a Major League Soccer franchise.
