= Smith Center for the Performing Arts =

Theater in Las Vegas, Nevada

The Smith Center for the Performing Arts
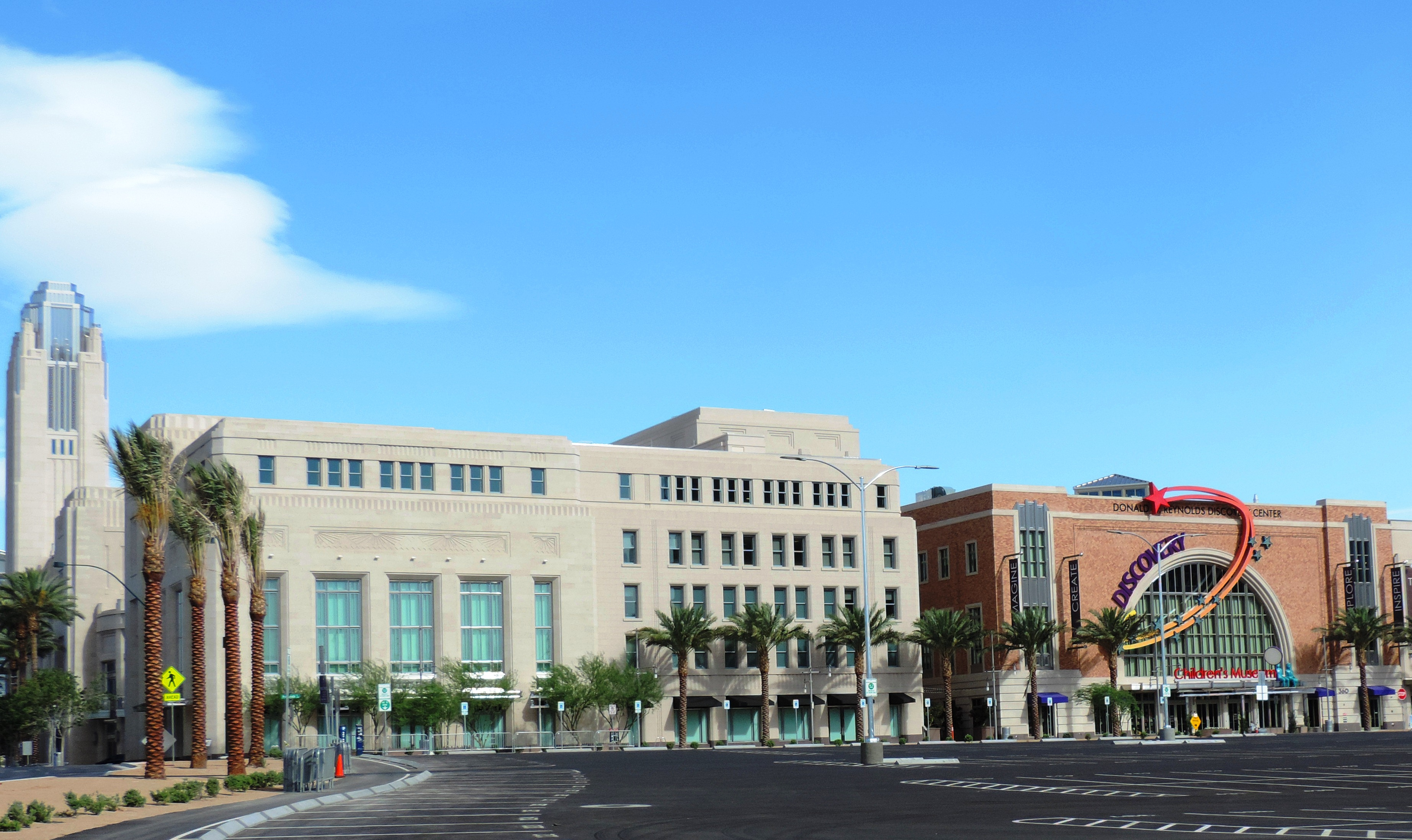
- The Smith Center for the Performing Arts in February 2012
- Interactive map of The Smith Center for the Performing Arts
- Location: 361 Symphony Park Avenue; Las Vegas, Nevada
- Coordinates: 36°10′7″N 115°9′8″W
- Capacity: 2,050
- Type: Performing Arts Center

Construction
- Built: 2009–2012 (David M. Schwarz)
- Opened: March 10, 2012

Website
- www.thesmithcenter.com

The Smith Center for the Performing Arts is a 5-acre (2.0 ha) performing arts center located at Symphony Park in Downtown Las Vegas, Nevada, United States. Consisting of three theaters in two buildings, the performing arts center is designed in the Neo Art Deco style. The architectural style was chosen by David M. Schwarz to echo the design elements of the Hoover Dam, just 30 miles (48 km) to the southeast. It also shares design features with the Will Rogers Memorial Center in Fort Worth, Texas. The center features a 17-story carillon tower containing 47 bells and is the first performing arts center in the nation to be Gold LEED certified. Groundbreaking for the $470 million complex began on May 26, 2009, and it opened on March 10, 2012.

The Smith Center features international music, and dance companies and is the home of the Las Vegas Philharmonic and Nevada Ballet Theatre. The center is under the leadership of President and CEO Myron Martin.

== History ==
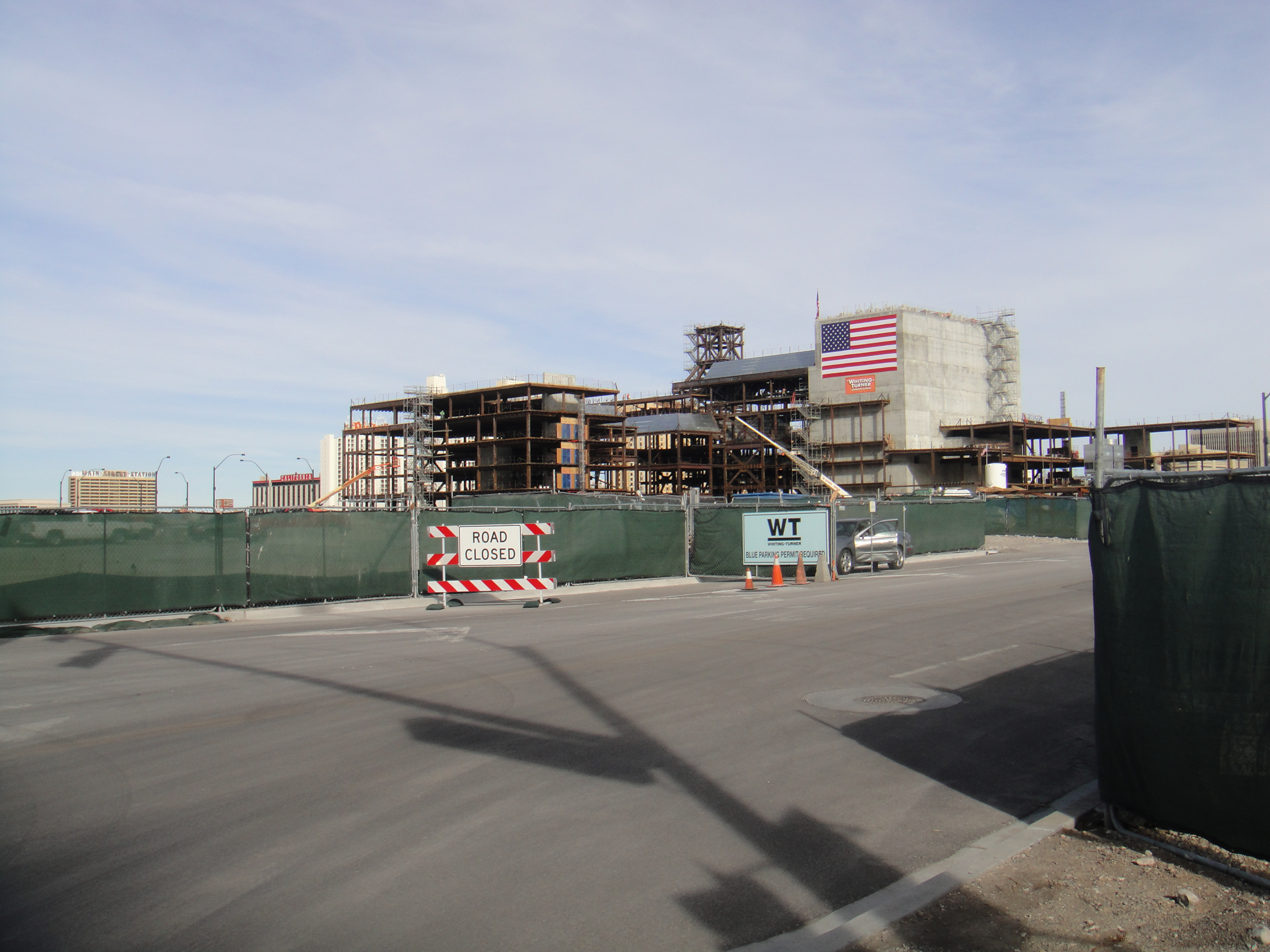
The Smith Center construction site in March 2010

Prior to The Smith Center's opening, Las Vegas was one of the largest cities in the country without a performing arts center. Some highly customized production shows and venues have long existed at various resorts on the Las Vegas Strip but none were geared towards the variety of performances that a stand-alone center would provide, such as that required for touring Broadway productions or major symphony orchestras. A smaller performing arts venue at the University of Nevada Las Vegas was inadequate for these purposes.

Plans were initially conceived for a new center around 1994. The Donald W. Reynolds Foundation made a donation of $150 million in 2005, the second largest donation to performing arts in United States history. A car rental fee was also initiated by Clark County and the State of Nevada to repay bonds of $105 million. These two factors together moved the public-private project towards construction. The building was named after Fred and Mary Smith, the chairman of the Reynolds Foundation and his wife, as the largest benefactors. The City of Las Vegas began separate plans around 2000 to build a downtown urban district called Symphony Park, which was selected as the site for the center.

In 2010, it was announced that the Lied Discovery Children's Museum would move to the Smith Center, replacing an originally proposed 600-seat theater that was scrapped from the plans in 2008. The reasoning was that the city already had numerous similarly sized venues in the various hotel resorts. A partnership with the Kennedy Center and some classrooms onsite provide educational opportunities for local youth. The planners expect the center to foster arts awareness and help to revitalize the downtown area with the center's opening in 2012.

== Architecture and artworks ==
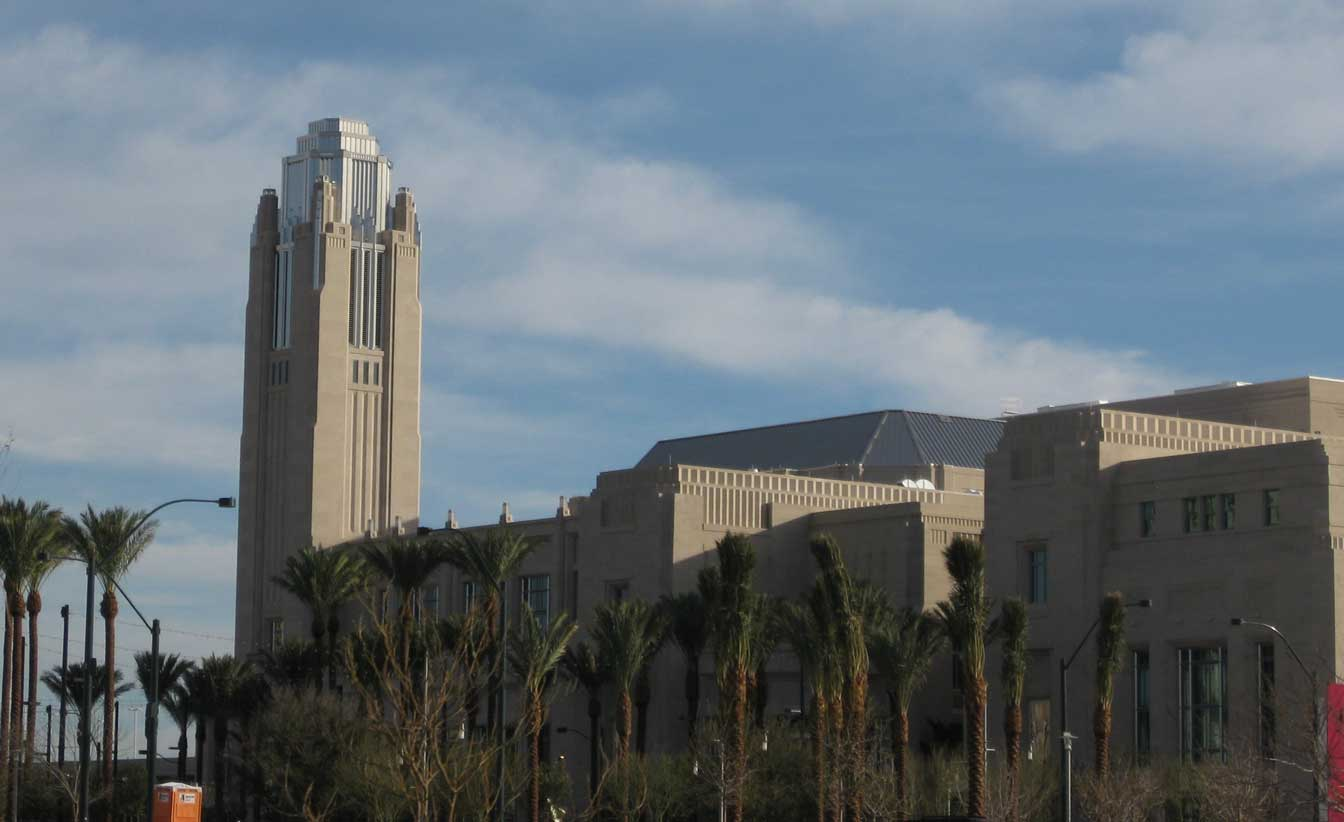
View towards the tower featuring Neo Art Deco design

The Smith Center Board wanted a timeless and elegant design, selecting architect David M. Schwarz to design the center, using inspiration from the Hoover Dam's Art Deco style as a major and lasting historical influence in the Las Vegas area. The building is a reinterpretation of Bertram Goodhue's 1922 design for the Nebraska State Capitol at Lincoln, and John & Donald Parkinson's 1929 Bullocks Wilshire in Los Angeles. White Indiana limestone for the façade (as at Lincoln), as well as numerous detail elements based on the Hoover Dam and 1920s motifs feature throughout the facility, including a winged sculpture in the center lobby modeled after the dam's famous Winged Figures of the Republic statues. A prominent flower theme was also added in select places since Mary Smith's favorite flower is the Blue Iris. In addition, artwork by local artists from the Las Vegas Art Museum have been loaned to the center to be displayed.

A large concert hall and two smaller theaters were designed as the main venues. At the corner is a 17-story tower featuring 47 bells and providing a new focal point for the downtown skyline, as well as the center. Audio design firm Akustiks worked with Schwarz to ensure optimum sound quality in all the venues, installing high tech sound enhancing features like retractable drapery and auto closing doors to reflect or absorb sounds based on the performance type. The main hall is also double soundproofed against outside noises. An outdoor park plaza was also built, serving as an additional outdoor concert venue if needed. It features an artwork by Tim Bavington, representing Aaron Copland's "Fanfare for the Common Man".

== Entertainment venues ==
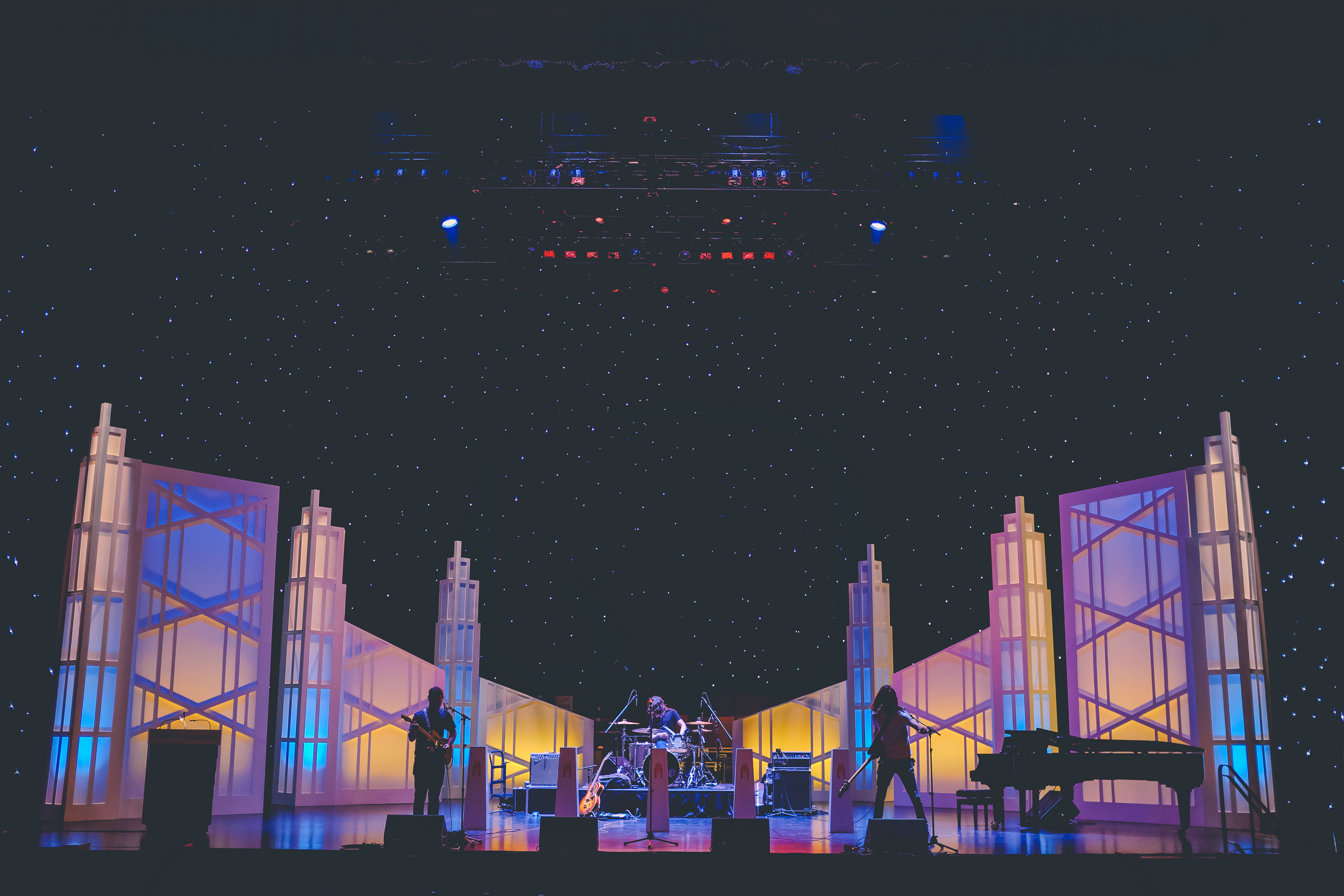
The main stage inside Reynolds Hall.

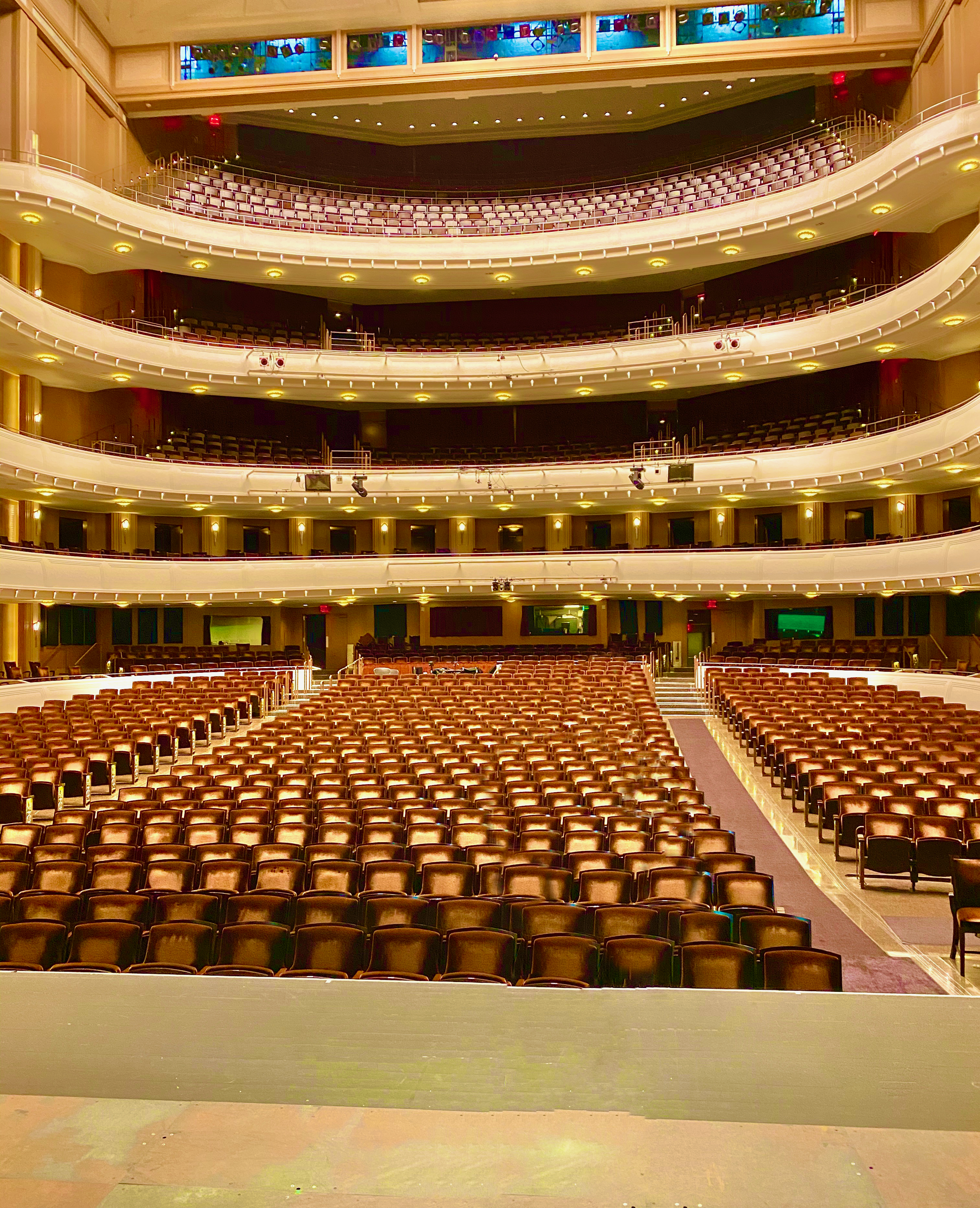
The 2,050-seat Reynolds Hall in 2019

The three main venues at the Smith Center are the Reynolds Hall, Myron's Cabaret Jazz and the Troesh Studio Theater, the first of which is located in its namesake building and the latter two in the Boman Pavilion.

- 2,050-seat Reynolds Hall is designed to keep the seats close to the stage, seating is on 5 levels
- 240-seat Myron's Cabaret Jazz is designed for more intimate performances.
- 250-seat Troesh Studio Theater rehearsal theater
- The 2-acre (0.81 ha) Donald W. Reynolds Symphony Park lawn for outdoor performances

=== Other features ===
- 47 bell carillon; is a 17 story tall tower containing cast brass bells that ring over 4 octaves.
- Elaine Wynn Studio for Arts Education
- Grand Lobby
- Founder's Room and Mezzanine Lounge

== Productions ==
Best of music, dance and Broadway from around the world. Broadway productions include blockbusters such as Book of Mormon, Wicked, The Lion King and Hamilton.

=== Resident companies ===
- Las Vegas Philharmonic
- Nevada Ballet Theatre

== Donald W. Reynolds Discovery Center ==
Part of the Smith Center campus includes the new home of the Lied Discovery Children's Museum, to be renamed the Discovery Children's Museum.
