= List of Las Vegas landmarks =

== Popular landmarks ==
This is an incomplete list of landmarks located in the Las Vegas metropolitan area.

Name	Image	Year	Comments	References
Welcome to Fabulous Las Vegas sign		1959	The "Welcome to Fabulous Las Vegas sign" located in the median at 5100 Las Vegas Boulevard South, is Las Vegas Strip Landmark. It was commissioned in May 1959 and erected soon after by Western Neon. The sign was designed by Betty Willis at the request of Ted Rogich, a local salesman who sold it to Clark County, Nevada.	
Vegas Vic		1951	Vegas Vic is the unofficial name for a neon sign resembling a cowboy that was erected on the exterior of The Pioneer Club in Las Vegas in 1951. The sign can still be found at 25 E Fremont Street at the same place since 1951 on the outside of what used to be The Pioneer Club but is currently a souvenir shop owned by Schiff Enterprises.	
Hoover Dam		1935	Hoover Dam, originally known as Boulder Dam, is a dam located in the Black Canyon of the Colorado River between the border of Arizona and Nevada. It was constructed between 1931 and 1936, and was dedicated on September 30, 1935, by President Franklin Roosevelt.	
Las Vegas Strip			The Las Vegas Strip is a 4.2-mile (6.8 km) stretch of Las Vegas Boulevard South in Clark County, Nevada. Many of the largest hotel, casino and resort properties in the world are located on the Las Vegas Strip. Nineteen of the world's 25 largest hotels by room count are on the Strip, with a total of over 67,000 rooms.	
Downtown Las Vegas			Downtown Las Vegas is the central business district of Las Vegas, Nevada. It is where the majority of the city's high-rise buildings are located and is the center for downtown gaming.	
Fremont Street Experience		1995	Fremont Street Experience (FSE) is a pedestrian mall and attraction in Downtown Las Vegas, Nevada. The FSE occupies the westernmost 5 blocks of Fremont Street, including the area known for years as "Glitter Gulch", and portions of some other adjacent streets.	
Fountains of Bellagio		1998	The Bellagio Fountains hotel and casino is a vast, choreographed water feature with performances set to light and music located at the front of Bellagio Hotel and Casino.	
Neon Museum		1996	The Neon Museum, also known as the Neon Boneyard or Neon Graveyard, features signs from old casinos.	
Little Church of the West		1943	The oldest building on the Las Vegas Strip, the Little Church of the West is a wedding chapel famous for celebrity weddings.	

== Local historic landmarks ==
The city of Las Vegas Historic Preservation Commission (HPC) oversees preservation activities for buildings, structures, and places of historical and architectural significance. The HPC review applications for the Historic Property Register, a list of locally significant historic places.

=== Individual landmarks ===
Landmark name	Image	Location	Built	NHRP date
Bonanza Underpass		East of 200 W Bonanza Rd	1937	January 28, 2004
Floyd Lamb Park at Tule Springs Ranch		9200 Tule Springs Rd	1964	September 23, 1981
Frank Wait House		901 E Ogden Ave	1930	N/A
Henderson House		704 S 9th St	1930	N/A
Huntridge Theater		1208 E Charleston Blvd	1944	July 22, 1993
Jay Dayton Smith House		624 S 6th St	1931	February 20, 1987
La Concha Motel Lobby		770 N Las Vegas Blvd	1961	N/A
Fifth Street School		401 S 4th St	1936	N/A
Westside School		330 W Washington Ave, Ward 5	1923	N/A
Las Vegas High School (now Las Vegas Academy as of 1992)		315 S 7th St	1931	September 24, 1986
Las Vegas Mormon Fort		500 E Washington Ave	1855	December 12, 1978
Las Vegas Springs(Big Springs)		309 S Valley View Blvd	500 AD	December 14, 1978
Mesquite Club		702 E St Louis Ave	1961	N/A
Morelli House		861 S Bridger Ave	1959	June 3, 2012
Moulin Rouge Hotel and Casino *demolished in 2010		840 W Bonanza Rd	1955	1992
U.S. Post Office and Courthouse(Mob Museum)		300 Stewart Ave	1933	February 10, 1983
Woodlawn Cemetery		1500 N Las Vegas Blvd, Ward 5	1914	November 21, 2006
El Cortez Hotel and Casino		600 Fremont Street	1941	February 22, 2013
Harrison Boarding House		1001 F Street	1942	N/A
Old Spanish Trail		8150 Tara Ave	1844	August 22, 2001
Wengert House		600 E Charleston	1938	N/A
Helen Toland Residence		1134 Comstock Dr	1947	N/A
Mesquitewood		418 W Mesquite	1955	N/A
John Mull's Meats		3730 Thom Blvd	1953	N/A
Eureka Locomotive		Address restricted	1875	January 12, 1995
Tule Springs Archaeological Site		Address restricted		April 20, 1979
Green Shack*demolished		2504 E. Fremont	1932	June 3, 1994

=== Historic districts ===
- Berkley Square Neighborhood Historic District
- John S. Park Historic District
- Las Vegas High School Historic District
- Las Vegas High School Neighborhood District
- Lorenzi Park Historic District
- Beverly Green Historic District
- Railroad Cottage Historic District
