= Lists of landmarks =

Below is a list of pages that provide a list of landmarks in a particular area or on a particular topic.

== Asia ==
- Beijing, China

== Europe ==
- Denmark
- Istanbul
- Lithuania

== North America ==
=== United States ===
- Albuquerque, New Mexico
- Chicago, Illinois
- Denver, Colorado
- Kansas
- King County, Washington
- Las Vegas, Nevada
- Milwaukee, Wisconsin
- Mississippi
- Omaha, Nebraska
- Pittsburgh, Pennsylvania
- Puerto Rico
- Riverside, California
- San Francisco, California
- Seattle, Washington
- Stockton, California

== Oceania ==
- Perth, Western Australia
