= Time Heals All =

Time Heals All may refer to:

- Time Heals All (album), a 2013 album by ASC (musician)
- "Time Heals All" (song), a 2023 song by Don Toliver off the album Love Sick (album)
- "Time (Heals All)" (song), a 1983 song by Natalie Cole off the album I'm Ready (Natalie Cole album)

== See also ==
- Quotations related to Terence at Wikiquote for "diem adimere aegritudinem hominibus" the origin of the term "time heals all"
- Time Heals All Wounds (artwork), a piece of public art in Las Vegas; see List of public art in Las Vegas
- "Time Heals All Wounds" (single), a 1996 single by Greedy Smith
- Time Heals All Wounds (album), a 2006 album by Chris Bathgate
- "Time Heals All Sorrows" (song), a 2007 song by Kotoko off the album I've Mania Tracks Vol.1; see Kotoko discography
- "Time Heals Everything" (song), a 1974 showtune from the stage musical Mack and Mabel
- Time Heals (disambiguation)
