= Betty Willis (artist) =

American graphic designer (1923–2015)

- Born: Betty Jane Whitehead; May 20, 1923; Overton, Nevada, U.S.
- Died: April 19, 2015 (aged 91); Overton, Nevada, U.S.
- Occupation: Graphic designer
- Years active: 1942–1999
- Known for: Designing the Welcome to Fabulous Las Vegas sign
- Parent: Stephen R. Whithead

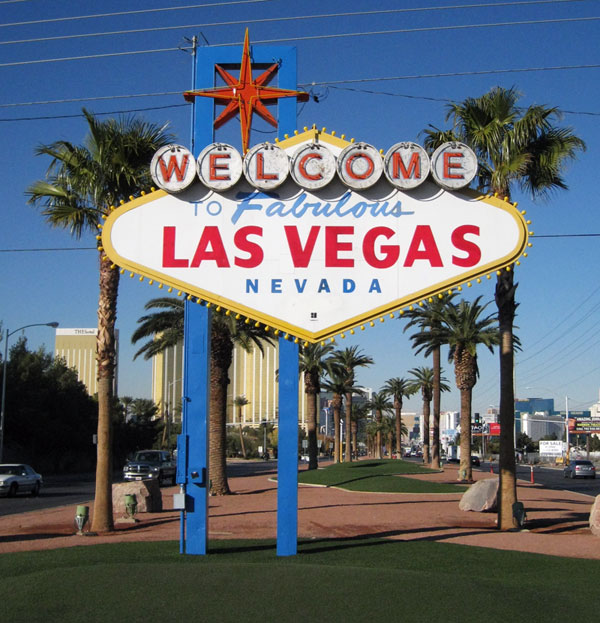
Willis' Welcome to Fabulous Las Vegas sign, completed in 1959.

Betty Jane Willis (née Whitehead; May 20, 1923 – April 19, 2015) was an American visual artist and graphic designer. She is best known for having been the designer of the Welcome to Fabulous Las Vegas sign, and has been attributed to being an influencer in defining modern Las Vegas' visual image.

== Biography ==
Willis born on May 20, 1923, in Overton, Nevada, the daughter of Stephen R. Whitehead, the first assessor of Clark County, Nevada, and homemaker Gertrude Meader. She grew up in Las Vegas, Nevada in the first two-story building that was built there. She went to Los Angeles in 1942 where she attended art school. Willis returned to Las Vegas where she first took a job at the courthouse, then worked as a commercial artist. She began her career as a commercial artist at YESCO, ad-art sign companies, and Fox West Coast Theaters. She then moved on to designing neon signs at Western Neon. She died at the age of 91 at her home in Overton, Nevada.

== Career ==
Willis was the only female commercial artist at her first job at YESCO, because creating neon signs had traditionally been a man's trade. She designed various newspaper advertisements before designing neon signs. Willis designed many signs for motels including the Moulin Rouge Hotel, the Blue Angel Motel and Blue Heaven bar, and the Del Mar Motel. Her designs are mid-century modernist and examples of Googie architecture. Her signs are drawn by hand and the sign that she designed for the Moulin Rouge Hotel was her own hand lettering inspired by French-style lettering that she studied. In her design for the Del Mar Hotel, she wanted one section of the neon to be seen from multiple angles. Willis continued to design signs until she retired at the age of 77.

== Welcome to Fabulous Las Vegas sign ==
It was at Western Neon that Willis designed her signature piece, the Welcome to Fabulous Las Vegas sign, completed in 1959. She was approached by a salesman named Ted Rogich, who was in contact with Clark County officials, who wanted a sign that would be located on the highway and would welcome people into Las Vegas. After studying other signs around Las Vegas and southern California, Willis created a design that was unique from other city arches and welcoming signs, though it does have familiar elements in Las Vegas signage of the time in particular two early signs at the Riviera which were also designed by Betty Willis The word “Welcome” was created with silver dollars as the backing to attribute to Nevada's nickname, the Silver State. The back of the sign featured the words, “Drive Carefully and Come Back Soon” that were meant to welcome people visiting Las Vegas. She never copyrighted the logo or profited from the sign directly outside of her employment with Western Neon in 1959. “It’s my gift to the city,” she told The New York Times, adding, “I should make a buck out of it. Everybody else is.” The sign appeared on the National Register of Historic Places in 2009.
