= Welcome to Fabulous Las Vegas sign =

Landmark in Paradise, Nevada

- The "Welcome to Fabulous Las Vegas" Sign
- U.S. National Register of Historic Places
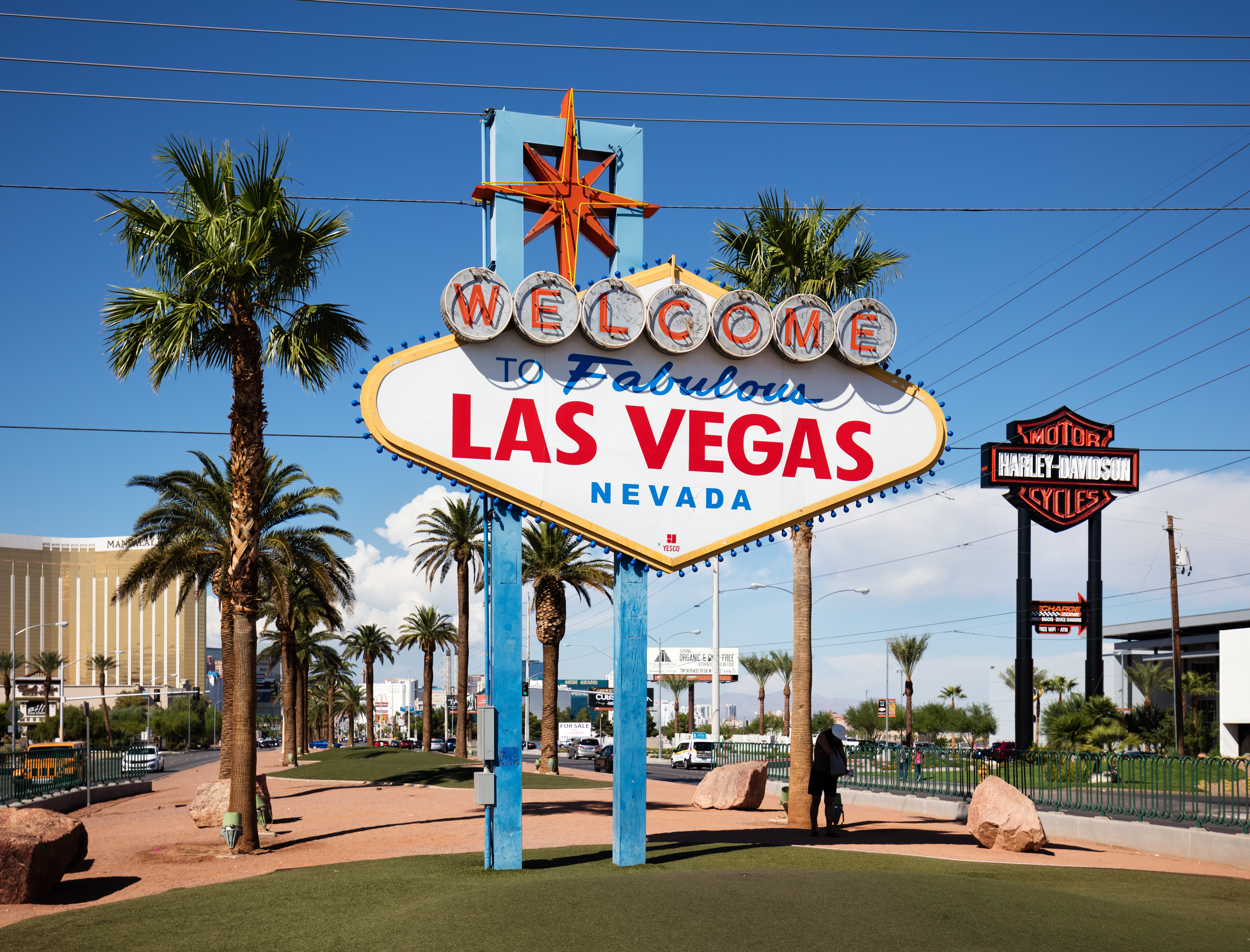
- The sign, just to the south of the Las Vegas Strip, welcoming visitors to the city in 2015

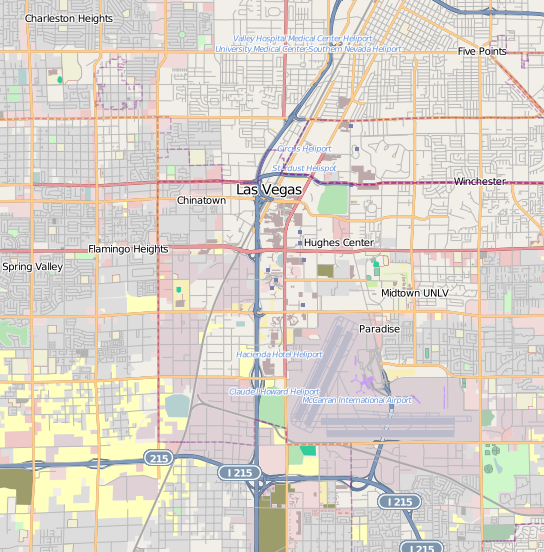
- Location within Las Vegas Boulevard Location within Nevada Location within the United States
- Location: 5100 Las Vegas Boulevard South; Paradise, Nevada, U.S. 89119
- Coordinates: 36°4′55.4″N 115°10′22″W
- Built: 1959; 67 years ago
- Architect: Betty Willis
- Architectural style: Googie
- NRHP reference No.: 09000284
- Added to NRHP: May 1, 2009; 17 years ago

The Welcome to Fabulous Las Vegas sign is a Las Vegas landmark funded in May 1959 and erected soon after by Western Neon. The sign was designed by Betty Willis at the request of Ted Rogich, a local salesman, who sold it to the government of Clark County in Nevada.

The sign is located in the median at 5100 Las Vegas Boulevard South, north of the historic stone pillars of the old McCarran Field on the east side, and level with the Bali Hai Golf Club on the west side. Some consider the sign to be the official southern end of the Las Vegas Strip. The sign, like most of the Strip, sits in Paradise and is located roughly 4 miles (6.4 km) south of the city limits of Las Vegas. The entire metro area is generally referred to as Las Vegas.

== Design ==
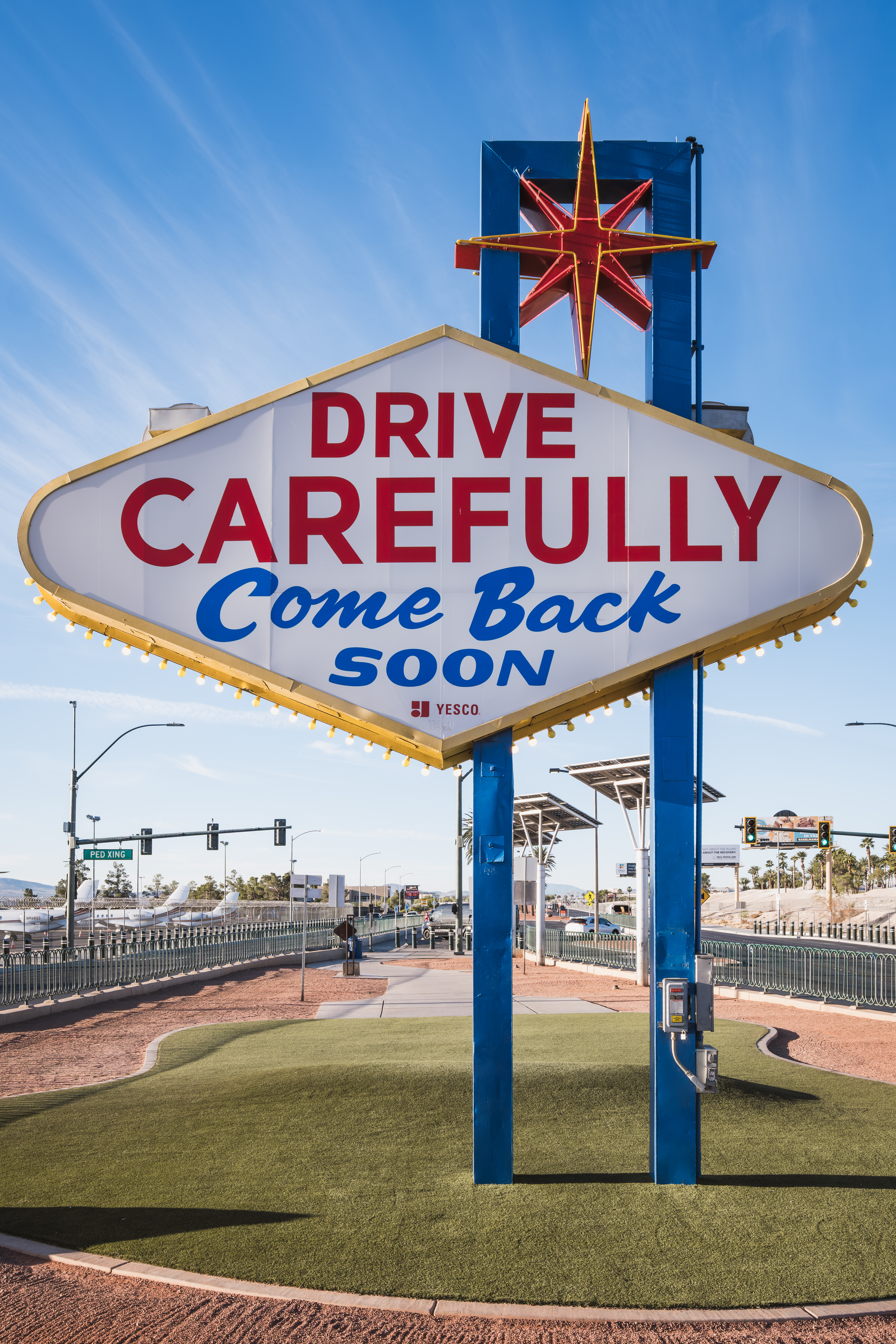
The back of the sign in 2026

The sign is a 25-foot-tall (7.6 m) classic roadside pole design, mounted offset on two flat poles which are joined by a cross piece at the top. The poles extend above the top of the sign. The sign is a horizontally stretched diamond shape, with the top and bottom angles pointed while the side angles are rounded. It is double-backed, internally lit, with a border of flashing and chasing yellow incandescent bulbs outside around the perimeter. In a nod to Nevada's nickname as "the Silver State," across the top of the sign are white neon circles, designed to represent silver dollars. The circles each contain a red painted letter, outlined in neon, which together form the word "Welcome." Crowning the sign, located between the two poles and just under the crosspiece is an eight-pointed, red-painted metal star outlined with yellow neon.

The intersecting vertical and horizontal lines of the star extend over and wrap around the frame that is created by the two poles and the cross piece, which give the star a dynamic, explosive appearance. The cabinet is faced with translucent white plastic and covered with blue and red painted text. The south side of the sign reads "Welcome" inside the silver dollars, with "to Fabulous" in blue, in a 1950s-style cursive, underneath. The words "Las Vegas" are on the next line in red, all capitalized, and large, almost filling the width of the sign. Under "Las Vegas" is the word "Nevada" in blue, all capitalized, in a much smaller font. On the back or north side, which is less frequently photographed and thus is lesser known, the sign reads "Drive" on the top line and "Carefully" on the second in red capital letters, with "Come Back" in blue on the third line, in script, and "Soon" all capitalized in blue on the fourth line. The design is characteristic of the Googie architecture movement.

== History ==
The sign was built and installed in 1959 by Las Vegas-based Western Electric Displays (aka Western Neon) under contract with Clark County. Betty Willis, an employee of Western Neon, designed the sign. It cost $4,000 to build the sign.

Legend has been written that "Willis considered this her gift to the city and wanted it to be in the public domain." She has been quoted in saying, "If I had copyrighted the sign, it probably wouldn't have been used as much and wouldn't be as famous. But, it would be nice to have a dime for every time it's been used." However, the Young Electric Sign Company (YESCO) has owned the sign since their purchase of Western Neon in the early 1960s, and the company leases the sign to Clark County. In 2007, Clark County installed decorative artificial turf underneath the sign.

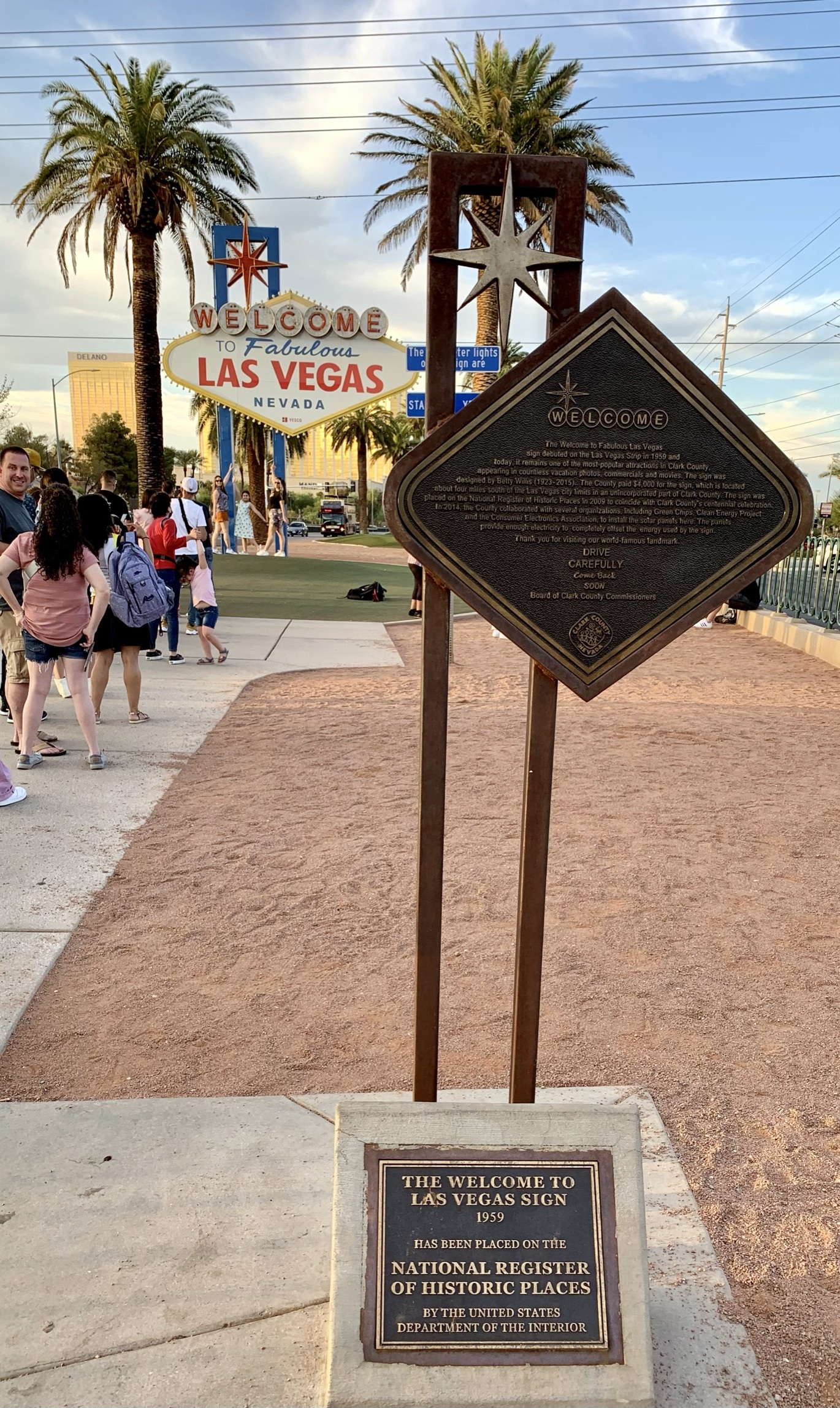
Historical marker placed at the site

In late 2008, Clark County employees sought to have the sign listed on the National Register of Historic Places; the Nevada State Historic Preservation Office officially nominated it, and the National Park Service approved the designation on May 1, 2009. On December 6, 2013, the State Historic Preservation Office for the State of Nevada announced that the "Welcome to Fabulous Las Vegas" sign had been added to the State Register of Historic Places. After Willis died on April 19, 2015, Clark County commissioners declared May 5, 2015, "Betty Willis Day" and issued a proclamation to her daughter Marjorie Holland.

=== Site improvements ===
Prior to 2008, access to the iconic sign for photo opportunities was risky. There was no legal place for visitors to park, and visitors had to cross travel lanes of Las Vegas Boulevard and hop up onto a median to reach the sign. Although there had been no known traffic fatalities involving pedestrians attempting to access the sign, rising traffic at the south end of the Strip presented an increasingly dangerous situation.

After control of Las Vegas Boulevard was transferred from the state to Clark County, county officials decided to improve access and increase safety around the sign for photo-seekers. On December 8, 2008, site improvements were completed in the median allowing official public access to the welcome sign for the first time. The $400,000 project included a parking lot with 12 parking spaces and two loading areas for buses and limousines, as well as a paved walkway leading from the parking to the sign viewing area.

The improvements were successful, and the small parking lot was soon overwhelmed by an ever-increasing number of visitors to the sign. In April 2012, the Clark County Commission authorized the expenditure of $500,000 to add 20 more spaces to accommodate visitor traffic.

On April 23, 2015, a second site enhancement project was completed at a cost of $900,000. This project added 21 additional parking spaces to the parking lot and completed additional cosmetic and safety improvements, including new marked crosswalks with traffic signals to allow safer pedestrian access to the sign.

=== Notable events involving the sign ===
On January 31, 2008, the sign turned red in support of National Wear Red Day. The American Heart Association's Go Red for Women campaign sought to educate the public on women's risk of cardiovascular disease and promote the importance of women getting screened for heart disease.

On March 28, 2009, the sign along with much of the Las Vegas Strip was darkened for one hour as the city took part in Earth Hour.

On May 14, 2009, Las Vegas Mayor Oscar Goodman and the Playboy personality Holly Madison coincided the start of summer with the sign's 50th anniversary. Part of the celebration was making it in the Guinness Book of World Records for the largest bikini parade, followed by pool parties throughout the city. The event kicked off in front of the sign with a runway-style retrospective featuring bathing suits from the 1950s to today.

April 28, 2010 marked the first time the text of the sign has ever been changed. Mayor Oscar Goodman unveiled the new marketing campaign "Camp Vegas." The sign was adorned with a cover that read "Welcome to Fabulous Camp Vegas." The event was hosted by Holly Madison, Wayne Newton, Oscar Goodman, and a slew of showgirls and skydivers. The Camp Vegas cover remained over the sign for 36 hours.

On October 5, 2017, following a mass shooting four days earlier, 58 crosses with hearts on them, all made by Greg Zanis, were placed behind the sign. Each cross represented a victim killed in the shooting.

On August 18, 2020, the sign was the site of the Nevada delegation's state roll-call at the 2020 Democratic National Convention.

On June 22, 2023, the sign was illuminated in rainbow colors in celebration of Pride Month, in partnership with the LGBTQ+ Center of Southern Nevada. Similar Pride Month lighting events were held in 2025 and 2026.

== Influence ==
=== Replica signs ===
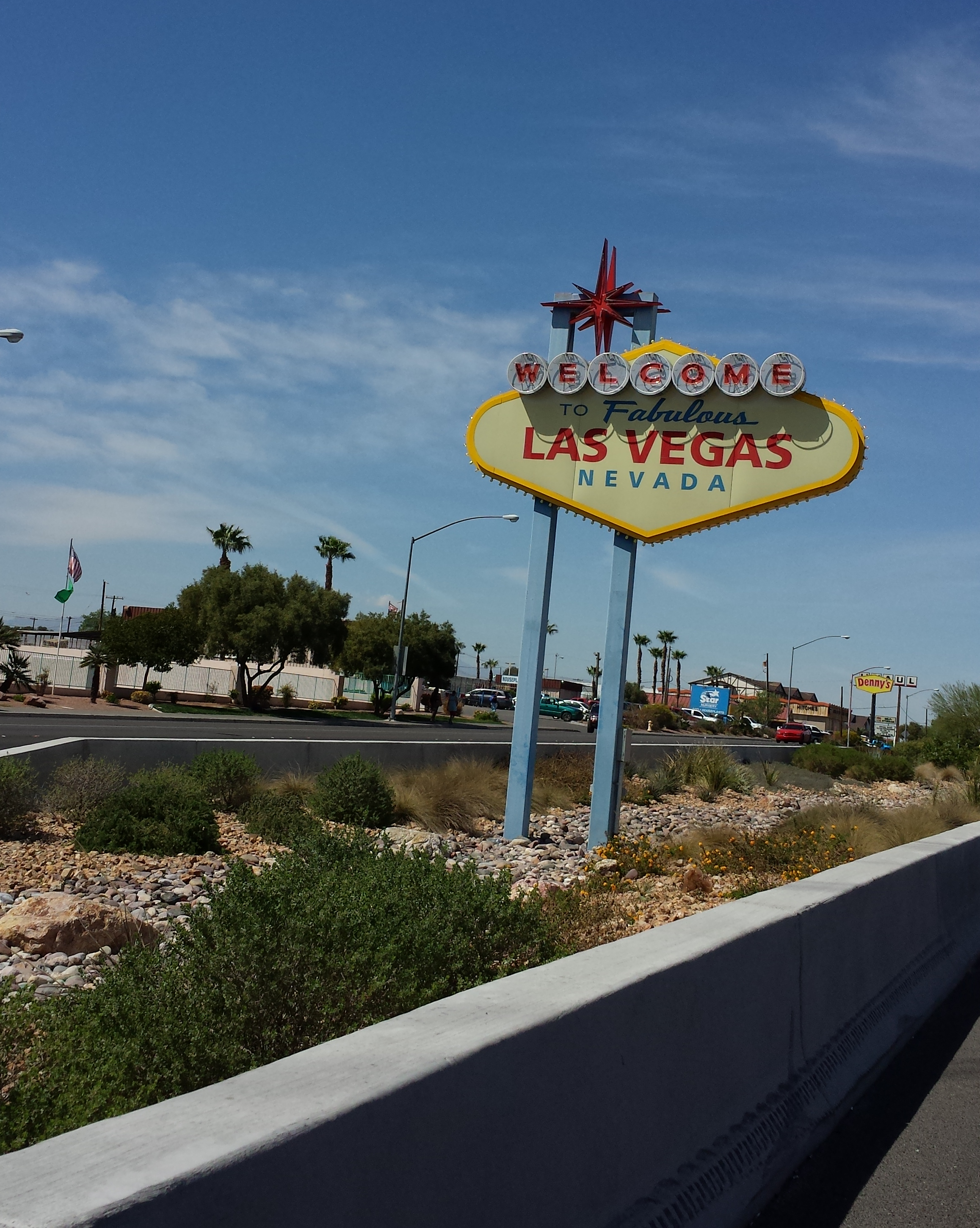
Replica Fabulous Las Vegas sign on Boulder Highway in 2015

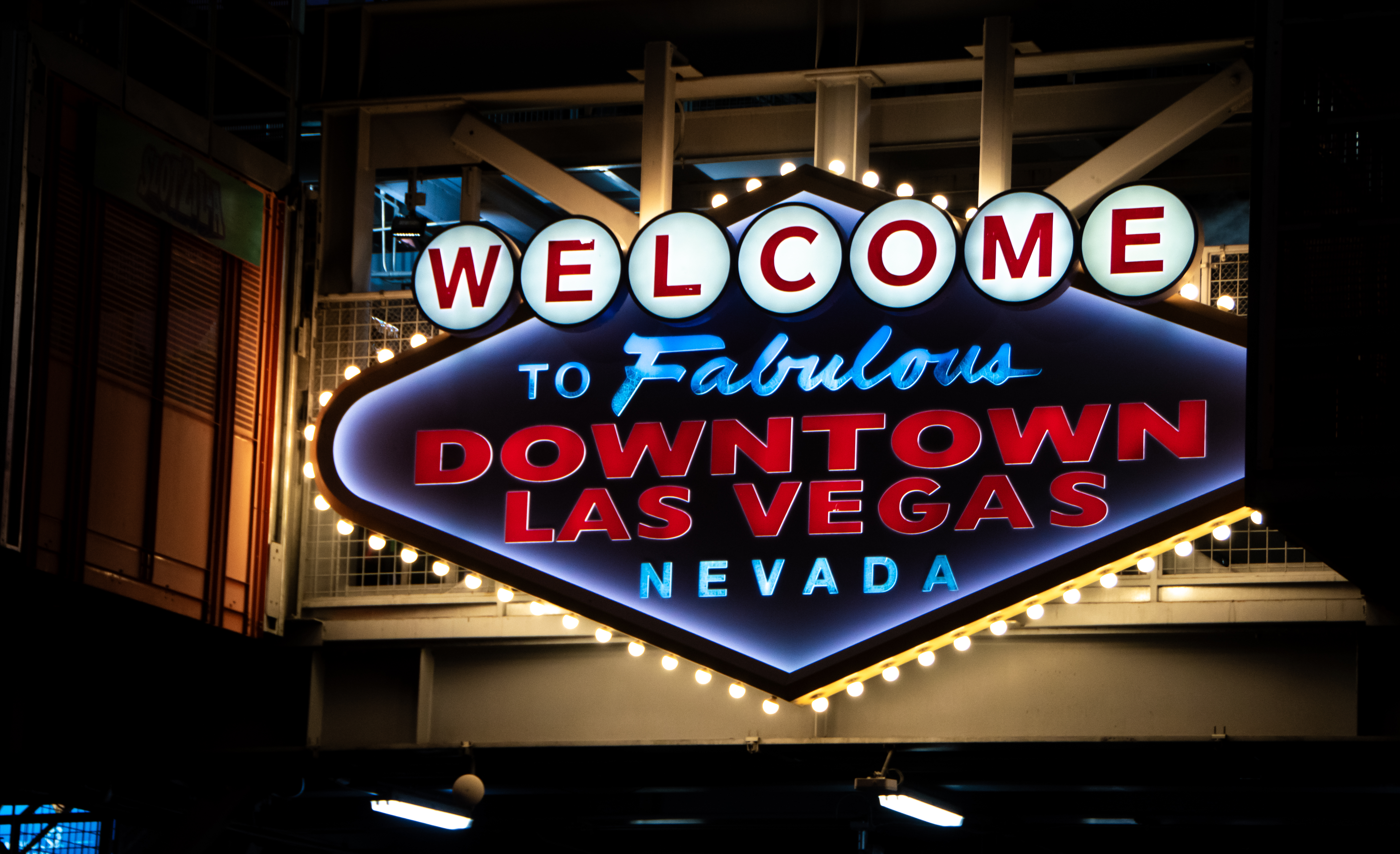
"Welcome to Fabulous Downtown Las Vegas Nevada" sign at the Fremont Street Experience, 2025

In 2002, the Las Vegas City Council erected a similar sign for the city proper reading "Welcome to Fabulous Downtown Las Vegas" at Las Vegas Boulevard and 4th Street, just within the city limits of the City of Las Vegas. This sign was destroyed in 2016 when a pickup truck crashed into it. After much debate over whether to replace the sign, the city council decided that the city needed its own unique entrance marker. The Gateway Arches, featuring a 7-ton (6,350 kg) "City of Las Vegas" YESCO sign over Las Vegas Boulevard, opened next to the Strat on November 18, 2020.

On March 6, 2007, another replica of the sign was installed on Boulder Highway just north of Tropicana Avenue, the result of casinos along the "Boulder Strip" uniting to have their own welcome sign. Like the original, it does not mark the border with Las Vegas; instead, it "represents the understood gateway from the Boulder Highway to Las Vegas" according to the Las Vegas Convention and Visitors Authority.

In 2013, the SlotZilla Zipline attraction was built at the Fremont Street Experience. A "Welcome to Fabulous Downtown Las Vegas" sign was added to one of its towers.

In 2022, the Chapel of the Flowers erected a sign reading "Married in Fabulous Las Vegas" to celebrate the five million couples who were married in Las Vegas. The city of Las Vegas, Clark County, and the LVCVA launched a ten-month-long campaign promoting couples who were married in Las Vegas to take a photo in front of the sign to win monthly prizes and one grand prize,

=== Use in souvenirs ===
In 2004, souvenir replicas of the sign that light up were sold to benefit the Nevada Cancer Institute.

In 2005, the image of the sign was featured on the Nevada license plate that was issued to commemorate the centennial of the City of Las Vegas.

On March 1, 2012, a business selling photos in front of a replica of the sign opened at Harry Reid International Airport in Las Vegas. This features an actual, physical sign located in the airport.

As of 2023, YESCO provides maintenance of the sign, and sells the replaced light bulbs as Official Las Vegas Lights, packaged in a wood box along with a letter of authenticity indicating the date lit.

== See also ==
- List of public art in Las Vegas
- National Register of Historic Places listings in Clark County, Nevada
- Vegas Vic, another famous symbol of Las Vegas
- Reno Arch (The Biggest Little City in the World), the famous "welcome sign" of Reno
