= Jay Dayton Smith House =

Historic house in Nevada, United States

- U.S. National Register of Historic Places
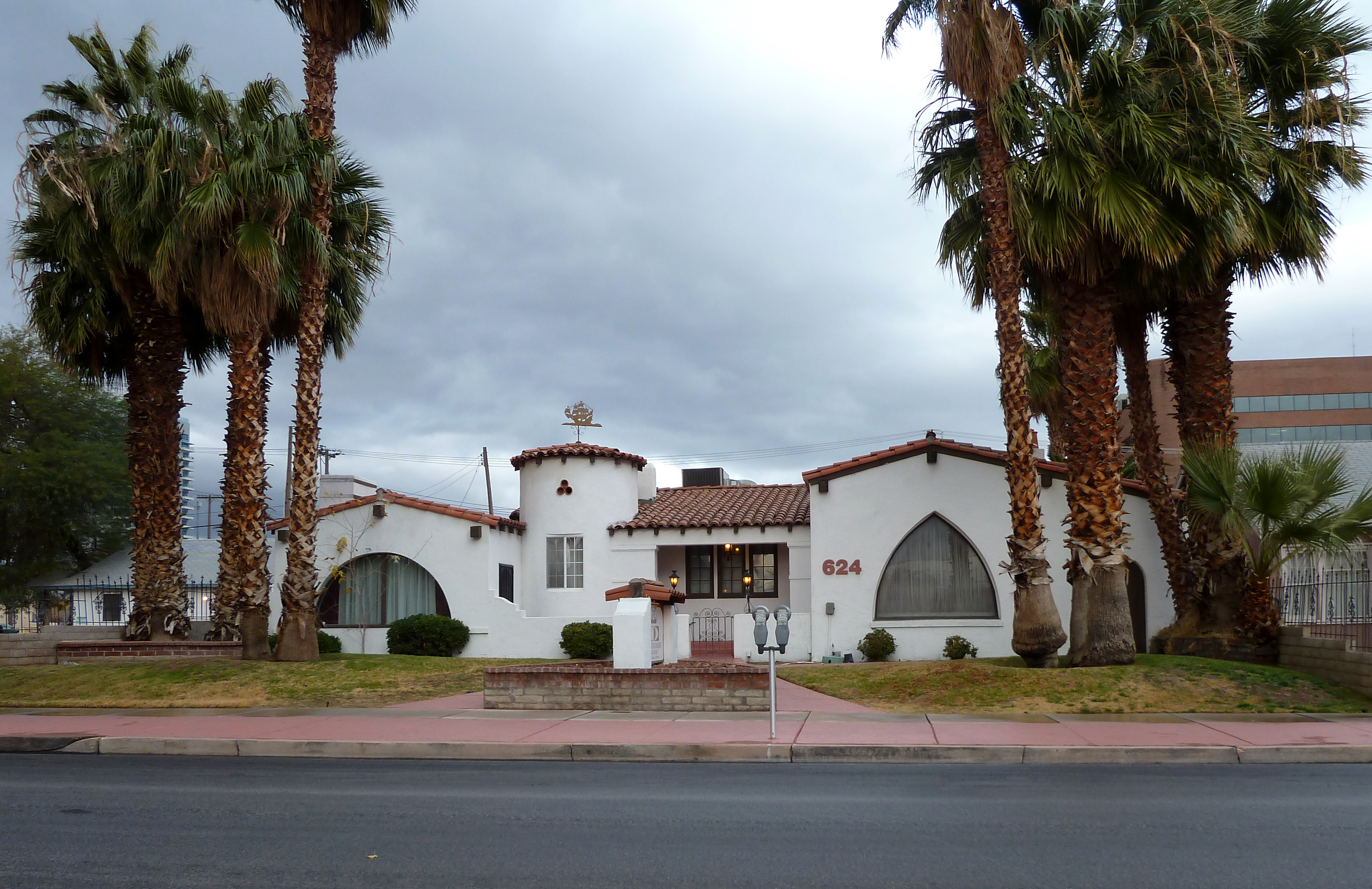
- Location: 624 S. 6th Street
- Nearest city: Las Vegas, Nevada
- Coordinates: 36.16226°N 115.1441°W
- Built: 1931
- Architect: Warner and Nordstrom
- Architectural style: Mission, Spanish Revival
- NRHP reference No.: 87000077
- Added to NRHP: February 20, 1987

The Jay Dayton Smith House is located Las Vegas, Nevada, within the Las Vegas High School Neighborhood Historic District and is currently used as an office.

The building was added to the National Register of Historic Places on February 20, 1987.
