= Club Renaissance =

Proposed residential tower in Las Vegas, Nevada, U.S.

- Interactive map of the Club Renaissance area

General information
- Status: Never built
- Type: Condominiums
- Location: Downtown Las Vegas, Nevada, United States
- Coordinates: 36.164242°N 115.147946°W
- Cost: $300 million (originally)

Height
- Height: 702 ft (214 m)

Technical details
- Floor count: 60

Design and construction
- Developer: Diversified Real Estate Group; Downtown Redevelopment Group

Other information
- Number of units: 950
- Parking: 1,400 spaces

The Club Renaissance was a proposed 60-story condominium tower that would have been built in downtown Las Vegas, Nevada. Besides residential units, other features would include office space, retail, and restaurants. The project was announced in January 2005, and construction was originally scheduled to begin later that year.

Las Vegas mayor Oscar Goodman initially praised the project for its affordability, noting the $150,000 starting price of its condo units, although he later threatened to revoke approval of the project in 2007, as construction had yet to begin. The project was ultimately canceled following financial issues.

== History ==
Marketing of the Club Renaissance began in December 2004. The project was officially announced the following month, by developers Diversified Real Estate Group and Downtown Redevelopment Group. Club Renaissance would consist of a 60-story condominium tower with 950 units. Las Vegas mayor Oscar Goodman noted the $150,000 starting price for condominiums in the project, saying, "I like the affordability of it." Philippe Pageau-Goyette, the president of Diversified Real Estate Group, planned for Club Renaissance to be the least-expensive high-rise condominium in the Las Vegas Valley, and said 95% of the project's inhabitants would be local residents: "I don't want to go after luxury, I want to go after locals. As of right now, we have no competition in the locals affordable market. A lot of guys are doing luxury."

The project was planned for a 1.5-acre parcel owned by Diversified, located at the southeast corner of Casino Center Boulevard and Bonneville Street in downtown Las Vegas. The target demographic consisted of young professionals who wanted to live in the downtown area. The Club Renaissance was one of several new projects being built in the downtown area, which was seeing a surge in redevelopment. Downtown Las Vegas was chosen for the project because of the area's large employee base, including lawyers.

The entire project would cost $300 million, and would include 20,000 sq ft (1,900 m^{2}) of retail space, located on the first floor. Other amenities on the lower floors were to include restaurants, a food market, child day care, and dry cleaners. An additional 78,000 sq ft (7,200 m^{2}) of office space would be located on the 13th and 14th floors, with condominium units beginning on floor 15. The top two floors were to include a private club and fitness center. The building would include several floors of parking, with a total of 1,400 spaces.

Construction was originally scheduled to begin in July 2005, and was expected to last about 18 months, with completion by 2007. The project received approval from the Las Vegas City Council in February 2005. Several historic railroad cottages located on the property were expected to be relocated to the Springs Preserve. The tower, expected to be 702 feet high, was one of the taller high-rise projects to be approved for downtown Las Vegas. Sales began in October 2005, at which point the starting price for units had increased into the $400,000 range because of rises in steel, concrete and labor costs. As of February 2006, the cottages remained on the site, with little progress on the Club Renaissance. Gilles Pageau, a Canadian developer and the uncle of Philippe Pageau-Goyette, said he had invested $60 million of his money into the project and that he had been offered an additional $400 million from various banks to cover the construction costs. Pageau said at the time that the project would still be built.

In February 2007, Goodman gave the developers two weeks to demonstrate to the Las Vegas City Council that the project was nearing construction; otherwise, he said the approval for the project would be revoked. Leanord Mussina, a spokesman for the project, had told the city council, "We're just a victim of construction costs. Financing has dried up to a large extent for Las Vegas. We're redesigning, trying to value engineer, to do something affordable. We're in negotiations with some large construction companies to joint venture at this point, because that's the only way to finance it." Mussina estimated that it could be up to a year before the start of construction, to which Goodman responded, "I'm not interested in a year. I've been to three groundbreakings there so far and haven't seen ground broke." Approximately $8 million or $9 million had already been spent on the project up to that point.

The city council ultimately granted the project a six-month extension. At the time, part of the property that was to be used for the project was in foreclosure. By March 2007, the project had been purchased out of foreclosure by Los Angeles architect Mark Vaghei and engineer Nabih Yousseff for nearly $3.5 million. The pair had previously placed $1.2 million in liens on the property. After their purchase, they began redesigning the project to be smaller, but Club Renaissance ultimately did not materialize.
