= Time Heals (disambiguation) =

"Time Heals" is a song by Rod Wave.

Time Heals may also refer to:

== Television ==
- HawthoRNe (TV series), a television show, which is a medical drama whose working title was Time Heals
- "Time Heals" (St. Elsewhere) (episode), a 1986 episode of the TV show St. Elsewhere
- "Time Heals" (Ben 10: Alien Force) (episode), a 2010 episode of the TV show Ben 10: Alien Force

== Songs ==
- "Time Heals", a song by Todd Rundgren from the 1981 album Healing
- "Time Heals", a song by Gear Daddies from the 1991 album Billy's Live Bait
- "Time Heals", a song by Peter Hammill from the 1977 album Over

== Other uses ==
- UNIT: Time Heals, an audio drama based on science fiction television series Doctor Who
- "Time Heals" (Exploring Tomorrow) (episode), a 1958 episode of the radio series; see List of Exploring Tomorrow episodes

== See also ==
- Time Heals All (disambiguation)
