= Railroad Cottage Historic District =

Historic district in Nevada, United States

Coordinates: 36°9′51.16″N 115°8′52.79″W

- U.S. National Register of Historic Places
- U.S. Historic district
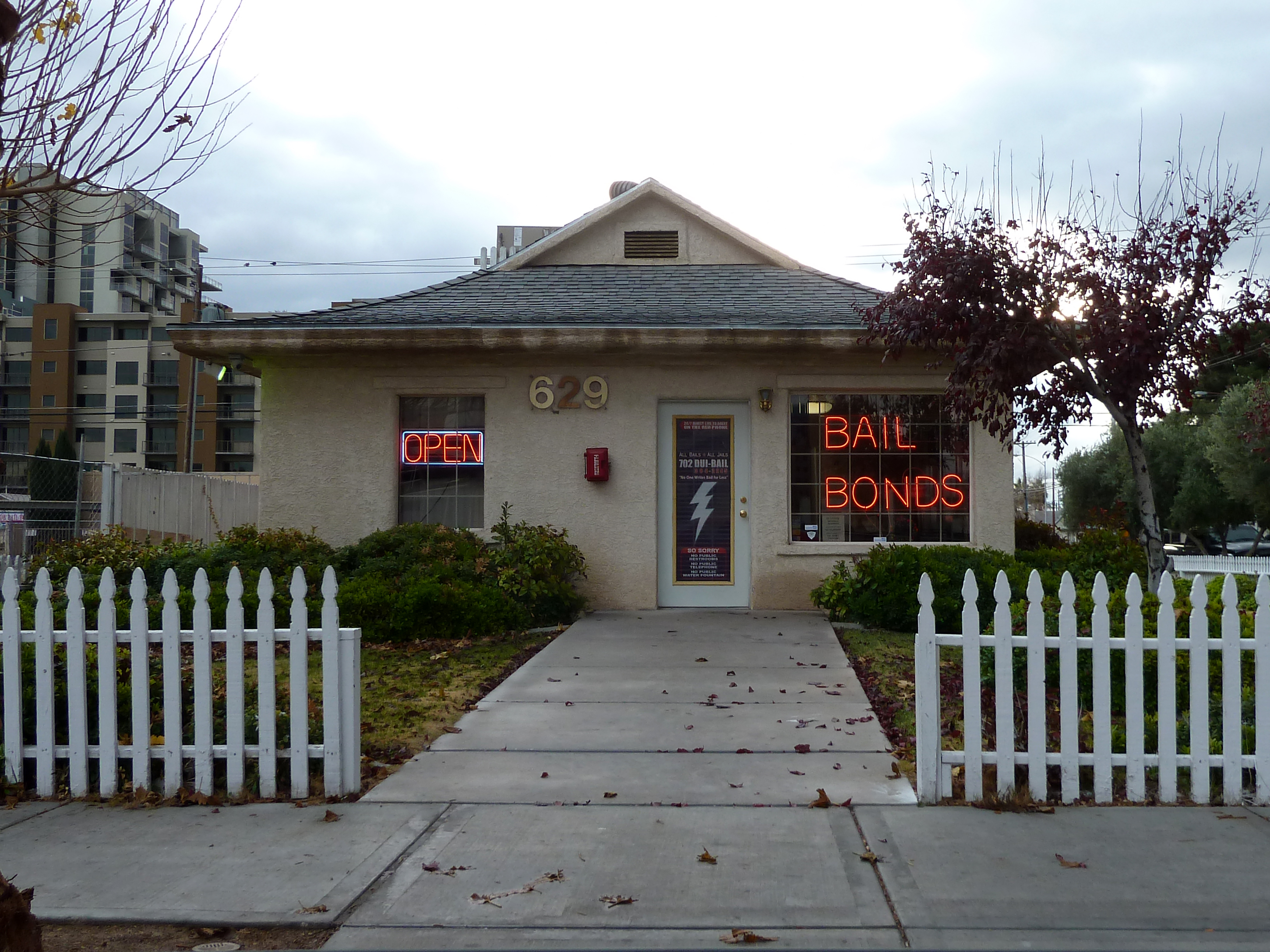
- The only remaining cottage in its original location.

- Location within Nevada Location within the United States
- Location: 601-629 S. Casino Center Boulevard; Las Vegas, Nevada
- Built: 1909-11
- Architect: San Pedro, Los Angeles & Salt Lake Railroad
- Architectural style: Bungalow/Craftsman
- NRHP reference No.: 87001622
- Added to NRHP: December 22, 1987

The Railroad Cottage Historic District is an area originally comprising eight historic cottages along Casino Center Boulevard in downtown Las Vegas, Nevada. The eight cottages had once been part of a development of 64 homes constructed by the San Pedro, Los Angeles & Salt Lake Railroad to provide housing for their employees. Although a handful of cottages still existed at the time, only eight neighboring cottages were included in the district when it was created in 1987.

Beginning in 2005, all but one of the eight cottages in the district were demolished or moved to clear land for the failed Club Renaissance condominium tower.

== Las Vegas' railroad cottages ==
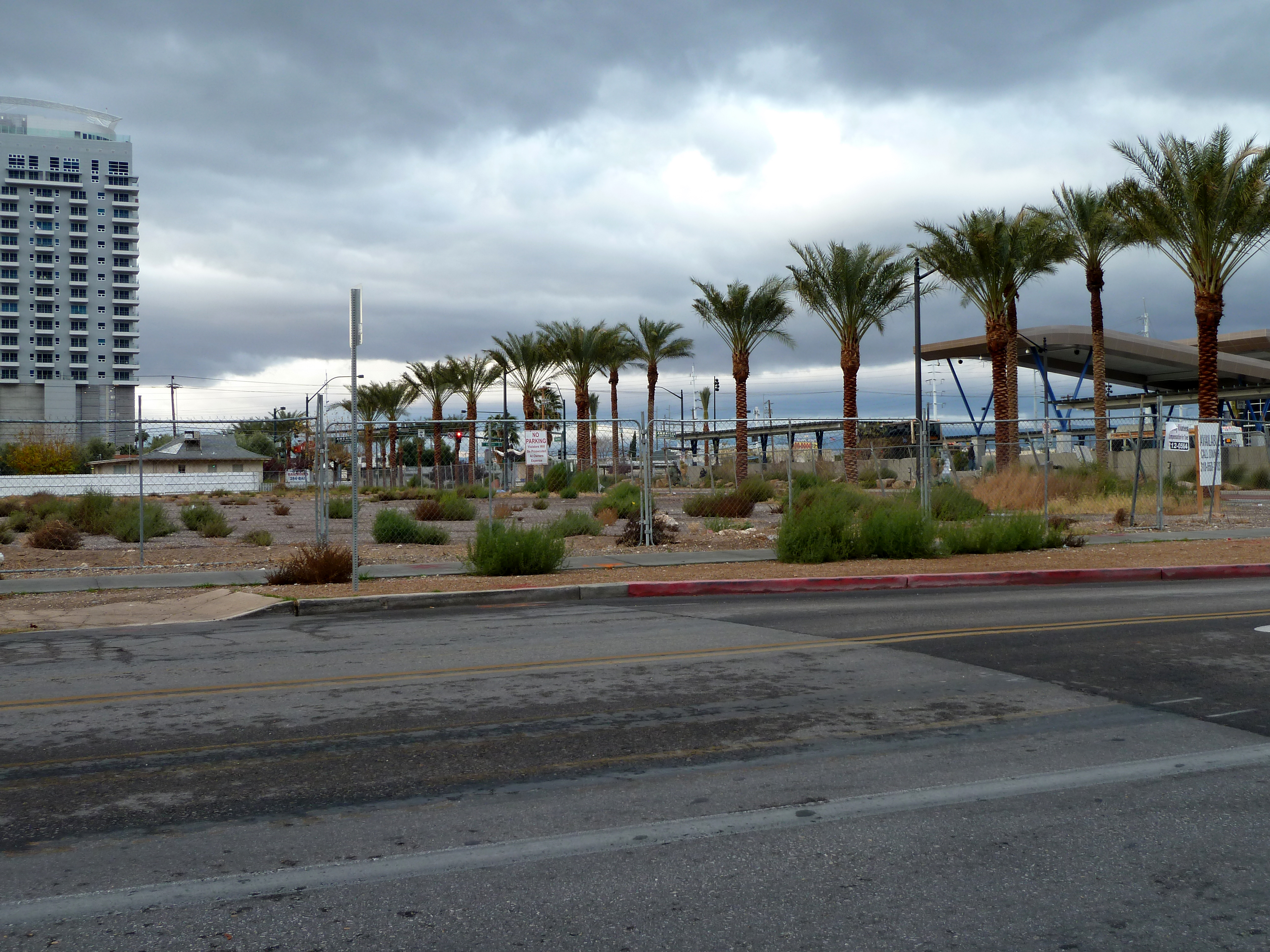
This empty lot was where the eight cottages once stood; the only remaining cottage is behind the white fence. As of 2019, the lot remains vacant.

A total of 64 cottages were constructed by the railroad from 1900 to 1912 in three different styles. The three bedroom model offered 812 sq ft (75.4 m^{2}) and the two bedroom house contained 768 sq ft.

This historic significance of the homes was first identified in a 1978 survey called Historic Preservation Inventory & Planning Guidelines City of Las Vegas, by Charles Hall Page & Associates. 28 homes identified as "Railroad employee cottages" were included in the survey.

Most of Las Vegas' railroad cottages have been demolished, although a few have been preserved. In 2002, the cottage at 521 Third Street was moved to the Clark County Museum, where it was restored and opened to the public in 2013. The cottage at 604 South Fourth Street was moved to the Springs Preserve in 2005, where it was later restored as part of the preserve's Boomtown 1905 exhibit. (Neither of these two cottages were part of the historic district.)

The former residence at 626 S Casino Center is the last remaining home of the Railroad Cottage Historic District. There are three other former railroad cottages on the same block at 608, 612, and 616 S 3rd, which were not included in the 1987 Railroad Cottage Historic District listing.

== The district's eight cottages ==
The district was added to the National Register of Historic Places on December 22, 1987.

The District's Eight Cottages
Address	Status
601 South Casino Center	Moved to Springs Preserve
605 South Casino Center	Demolished 2006
609 South Casino Center	Demolished 2006
613 South Casino Center	Demolished prior to May 2002
617 South Casino Center	Moved to Springs Preserve
621 South Casino Center	Moved to Springs Preserve
625 South Casino Center	Demolished 2006
629 South Casino Center	Only remaining cottage at original location

As most of the district was to be replaced by Club Renaissance, it was decided to save some of the cottages. Three of the homes were moved to a temporary location in the Springs Preserve in 2005 and/or 2006. In 2013, the cottages were moved to a permanent location within the preserve and restoration work began. The three restored cottages were included in the preserve's Boomtown 1905 exhibit that opened February 4, 2017.
