= Las Vegas Academy of the Arts =

Coordinates: 36°9′50″N 115°8′21″W

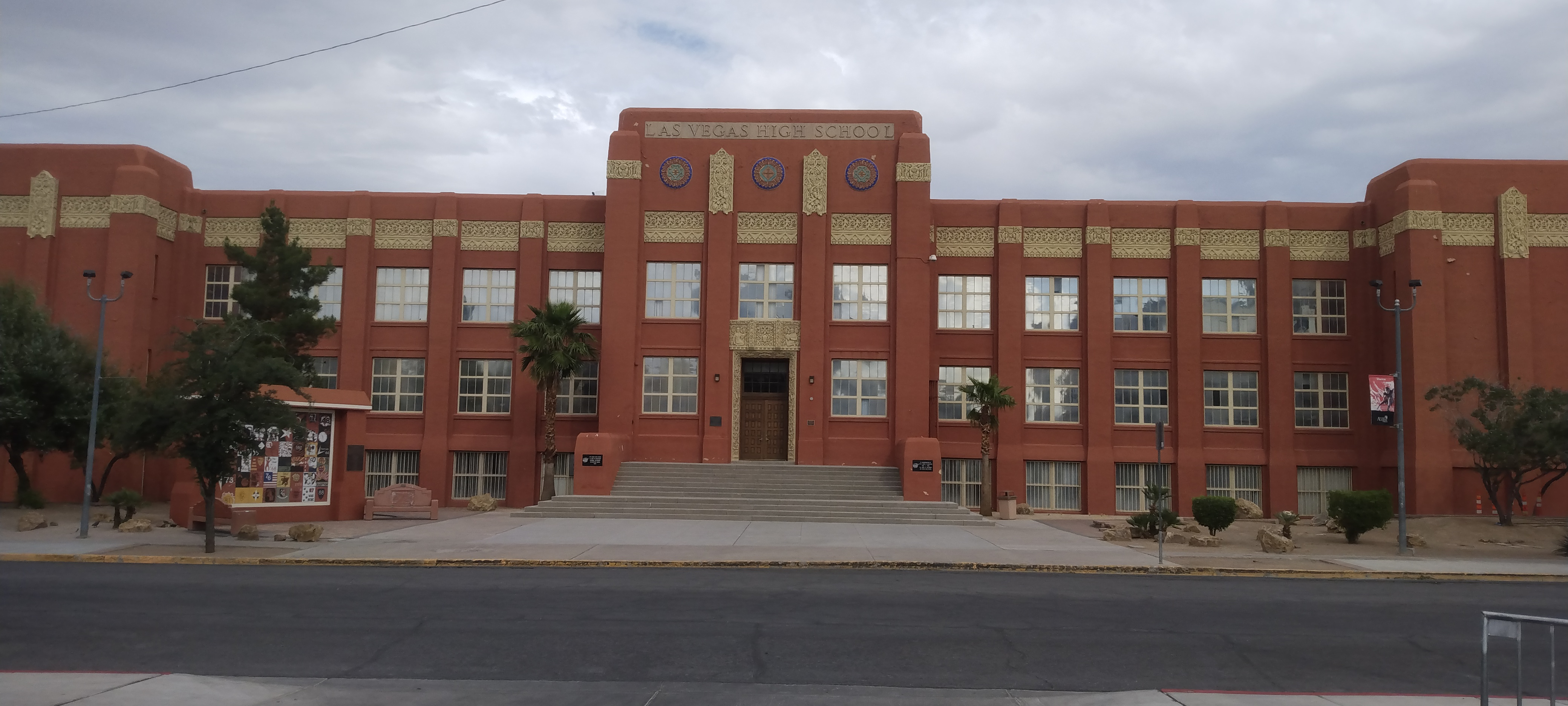
- Originally built as Las Vegas High School

Location
- 315 South 7th Street; Las Vegas, Nevada 89101; United States

Information
- School type: Magnet High School
- Motto: From Excellence to Eminence
- Established: 1992
- School district: Clark County School District
- Principal: Colin Wyrsch
- Teaching staff: 77.50 (FTE)
- Grades: 9-12
- Enrollment: 1,751 (2023-2024)
- Student to teacher ratio: 22.59
- Colors: Red, teal, purple, yellow
- Nickname: LVA
- Rivals: Del Sol Academy
- Publication: Accolades
- Website: https://www.lasvegasacademy.net/

The Las Vegas Academy of the Arts is a magnet high school located in Downtown Las Vegas, Nevada. Students are accepted through an audition process and claim a major pertaining to performing arts or visual arts.

== History ==
=== Las Vegas High School ===
The Las Vegas Academy's campus is located on the site of the first high school in Las Vegas. The school uses two of the buildings that were constructed in 1930 and opened in the fall of 1931. Las Vegas High School was the first high school in Las Vegas, and its location caused controversy at the time. Many residents believed the school was too far away from the small population at the time, which has changed as the city grew around the school. The school originally had three buildings: the tri-level Main building on the corner of 7th St. and Bridger Ave., the Gymnasium, and a third building that housed manual arts (shop classes) and in later years government classes. It was torn down in 1969. The two remaining buildings are listed as the Las Vegas High School Academic Building and Gymnasium on the National Register of Historic Places, representing Las Vegas' best example of art-deco architecture of the 1930s. The school's outer appearance has been maintained but the interior has been changed since its original construction.

=== Las Vegas Academy ===
In 1992, plans for a magnet school for the arts were announced by Assistant Superintendent Noor, and on August 23, 1993, Las Vegas High School was re-opened as the Las Vegas Academy for International Studies and Performing Arts by founding principal. Visual Arts was added the following year. Starting with only 735 students, the student body has since grown to an excess of 1700 students attending the school pursuing majors in the performing and visual arts. The CCSD Board of Trustees officially changed the school's name to Las Vegas Academy of the Arts in November 2014. Las Vegas Academy has been honored by the U.S. Department of Education as both a New American High School and a Blue Ribbon School. The Arts Schools Network (ASN) awarded LVA the Outstanding Arts School 2013-2014 and Exemplary Arts School status for 2014–2016.

=== LVA Programs ===
The school divides its student base into four conservatories: art, dance, music, theatre, and visual arts.

== Theatrical venues ==
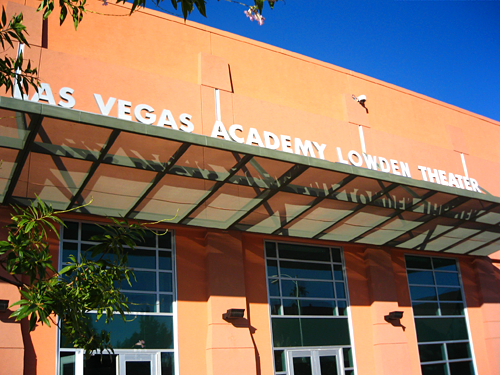
The Las Vegas Academy Lowden Theatre for the Performing Arts after the 2007-2008 renovation

- Academy Theatre Black Box
- LVA Performing Arts Center
- Las Vegas Academy Lowden Theater for the Performing Arts

== Notable alumni ==
- 702 — R&B group
- Molly Bernard — actress
- Leah Dizon — singer and model active in Japan
- Matthew Gray Gubler — actor
- Julianne Hough — singer/dancer
- Dasha Nekrasova — actress
- Ne-Yo — R&B artist
- Sizzy Rocket — singer
- Baron Vaughn — actor/comedian
- Rutina Wesley — actress
- Tommy Ward — singer
