= List of Perth landmarks =

Landmarks in Perth comprise human-made structures, or natural features that command the horizon physically, or the cultural landscape, usually by historical or political significance.

== CBD ==
- Barracks Arch – At the west end of St Georges Terrace, symbolic historically due to the position between Parliament House and St Georges Terrace. It was the last remaining part of a large government building that was removed for the construction of the freeway just west of the Arch.
- 108 St Georges Terrace – Features on the horizon when viewing Perth from distance, amongst a cluster of buildings that exist within the CBD.
- Central Park Tower – The tallest skyscraper in Perth.
- Council House – restored high modernist skyscraper set in the Stirling Gardens
- Elizabeth Quay
- Kings Park – A surviving piece of bushland adjacent to the city, with statues and war memorials.
- Narrows Bridge – a major traffic bridge crossing the Swan River
- Perth Arena – Entertainment and sporting arena.
- Perth Convention Exhibition Centre, located in the CBD
- Perth Mint – Australia's oldest operating mint, established in 1899 to mint gold sovereigns for the British Empire
- Perth Town Hall – The only convict-built town hall in Australia, built between 1868 and 1870.
- Perth Water – A much reduced corner of the Swan River with land infill on both north and south shores over the duration of a hundred years
- Swan Bells – At the foot of Barrack Street, this very recent construction contains significant historic bells.
- WA Maritime Museum
- Yagan Square

== Fremantle ==
- Esplanade Park, Fremantle
- Fremantle Arts Centre
- Fremantle Fishing Boat Harbour
- Fremantle War Memorial
- Fremantle Prison
- Fremantle Town Hall
- Fremantle railway station
- Fremantle Port Authority building – the tallest building in Fremantle
- Round House – built in 1830, and used as a prison for colonial and indigenous prisoners until 1886
- Western Australian Maritime Museum on Victoria Quay
- Victoria Quay, Fremantle

== Metropolitan area ==
- Burswood Entertainment Complex – on the top of what was originally a swampy dump, a complex of international standard hotel, casino and other facilities
- Houghton Winery – historic Swan Valley winery established in 1836
- Galup(fmr Lake Monger) – a wetland area 5 km (3.1 mi) north of the city popular for bird watching
- Lincoln Street Vent – a ventilation shaft in Highgate
- Mount Henry Peninsula – Peninsula on the edge of Canning river near Mount Henry Bridge
- The Old Mill – Built in 1835, this is Perth's best-known historic landmark
- Perth Zoo in South Perth surrounded by expensive real estate this sanctuary for exotic and native wildlife has been re-invented a number of times since it was founded
- Rottnest Island – A holiday island 18 km (11 mi) from Fremantle

== See also ==
- Tourism in Perth
