= List of public art in Las Vegas =

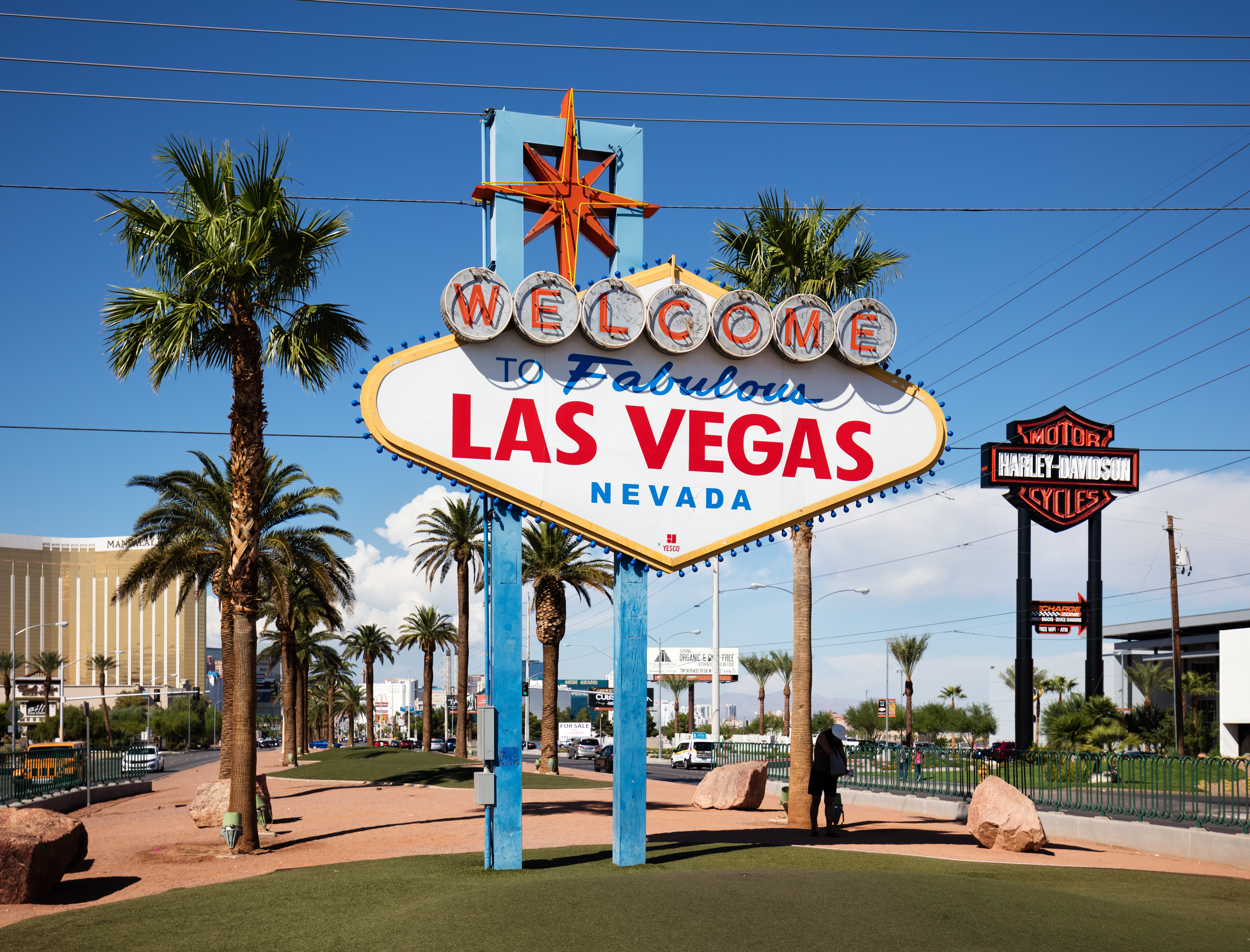
Welcome to Fabulous Las Vegas sign

The following public artworks have been installed in Las Vegas:

- Atomic Tumbleweed (Wayne Littlejohn)
- Big Edge (Nancy Rubins)
- Bliss Dance (Marco Cochrane)
- Dream Machine (Wayne Littlejohn)
- Equestrian statue of Rafael Rivera (Jim Carey, 1978)
- Flashlight (Claes Oldenburg and Coosje van Bruggen)
- LGBT Mural
- Monument to the Simulacrum
- Paintbrush Gateway
- Spin Baby (Wayne Littlejohn)
- Time Heals All Wounds
- Vaquero
- Welcome to Fabulous Las Vegas sign
