= Las Vegas High School Historic District =

Historic district in Nevada, United States

- U.S. National Register of Historic Places
- U.S. Historic district
- Location: 315 South 7th St., 925 East Clark Ave., Las Vegas, Nevada
- NRHP reference No.: 100007431
- Added to NRHP: March 3, 2022

- Las Vegas High School Academic Building, Gymnasium, and Frazier Hall
- U.S. National Register of Historic Places
- U.S. Historic district – Contributing property
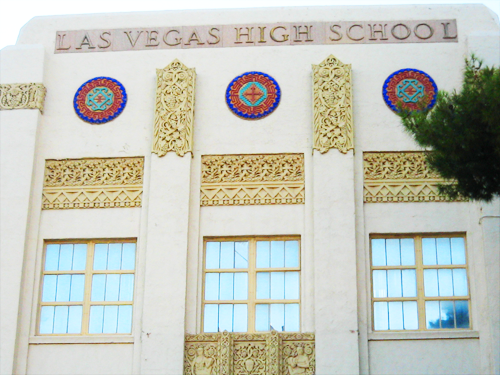

- Location within Nevada Location within the United States
- Location: 315 S. Seventh St., Las Vegas, Nevada
- Coordinates: 36°9′55″N 115°8′20″W
- Built: 1930
- Architect: George A. Ferris & Son
- Architectural style: Art Deco, Aztec Moderne
- Part of: Las Vegas High School Neighborhood Historic District (ID90002204)
- NRHP reference No.: 86002293 (original); 100006408 (increase)

Significant dates
- Added to NRHP: September 24, 1986
- Boundary increase: July 22, 2021
- Designated CP: January 30, 1991

The Las Vegas High School Historic District in Las Vegas, Nevada is a historic district which includes 11 buildings on the 15 acres (6.1 ha) campus of the school district. It was listed on the National Register of Historic Places in 2022.

It includes the Las Vegas High School Academic Building, Gymnasium, and Frazier Hall, now the Las Vegas Academy of International Studies and Performing Arts. The academic building and gymnasium is an Art Deco building which was listed on the National Register in 1986, and which represents a subset of the Art Deco style known as "Aztec Moderne", in which Aztec design motifs were used in an overall Art Deco palette of forms and materials. The academic building and the gymnasium are two of the original 3 buildings that were built. The third was destroyed around 1950. The listing was expanded to include Frazier Hall in 2021.

Described as the best example of Art Deco in Las Vegas, the school was designed by father-and-son architects George A. Ferris & Son of Reno, Nevada. The stucco-covered reinforced concrete buildings are decorated with a variety of polychrome medallions and friezes depicting animals and plants. The two-story academic building, measuring 208 by 82 feet (63 by 25 m), is part of a seven-building complex within the larger Las Vegas High School Neighborhood Historic District. The gymnasium is of complementary form and construction, measuring 113 by 83 feet (34 by 25 m). The gymnasium's entrance is rendered as a stylized Mayan arch. The Academic Building and Gymnasium are linked by the 1952 Humanities Building, which is not regarded as contributing to the historic character of the complex.

The school became a magnet school for specialized studies in 1993.

The Academic Building and Gymnasium were listed on the National Register of Historic Places on September 24, 1986. It was included as a contributing property in the National Register listing of the large Las Vegas High School Neighborhood Historic District in 1991. The academic building and gymnasium listing was enlarged in 2021 to include Frazier Hall. The entire campus was then listed on the National Register in 2022.
