= List of Landmarks and Historic Places in San Francisco =

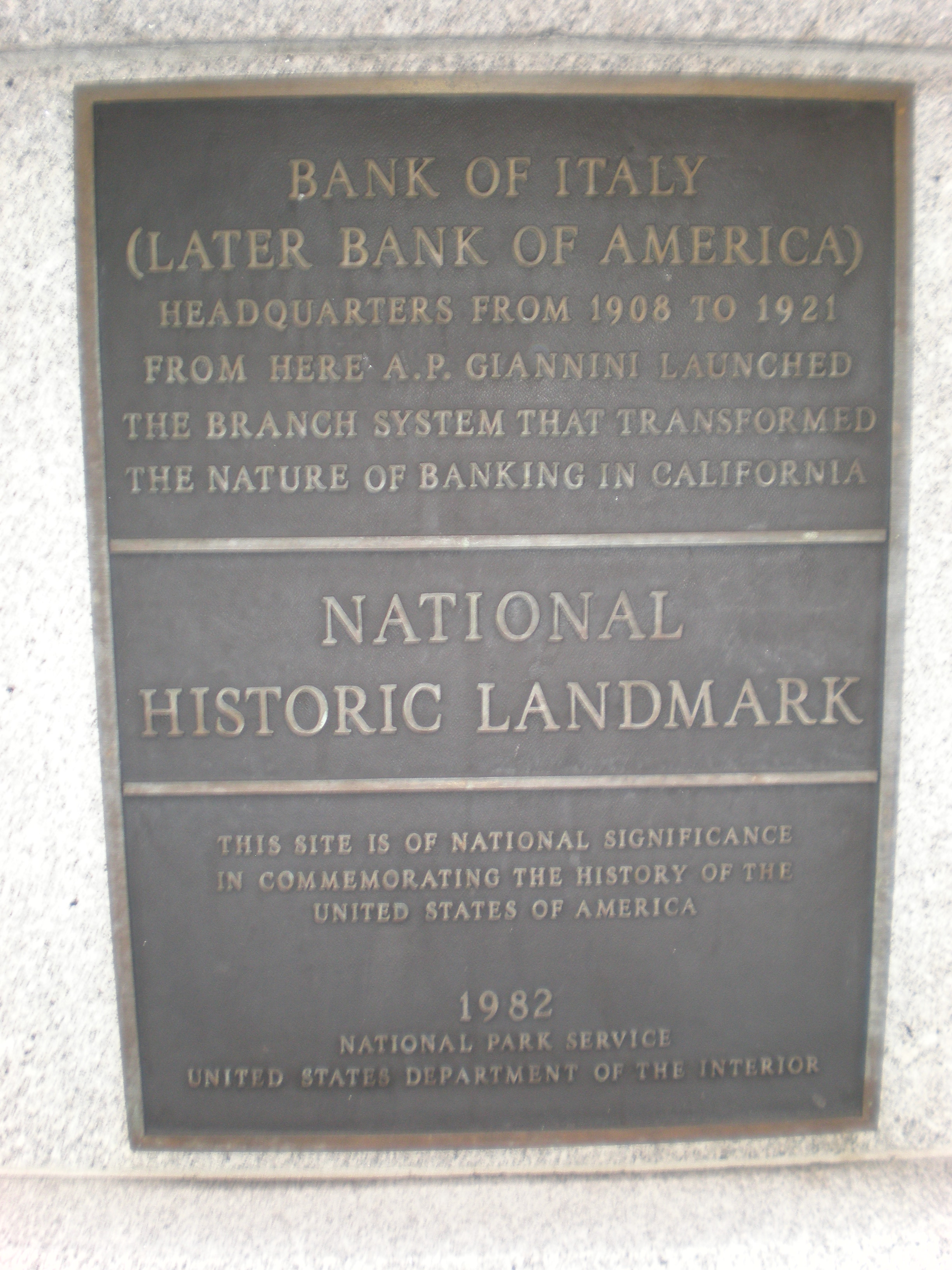
The Bank of Italy Building National Historic Landmark plaque.

This is a combined list of all national, state, and local landmarks and historic places in San Francisco, California. Some locations appear on multiple lists.

== National ==
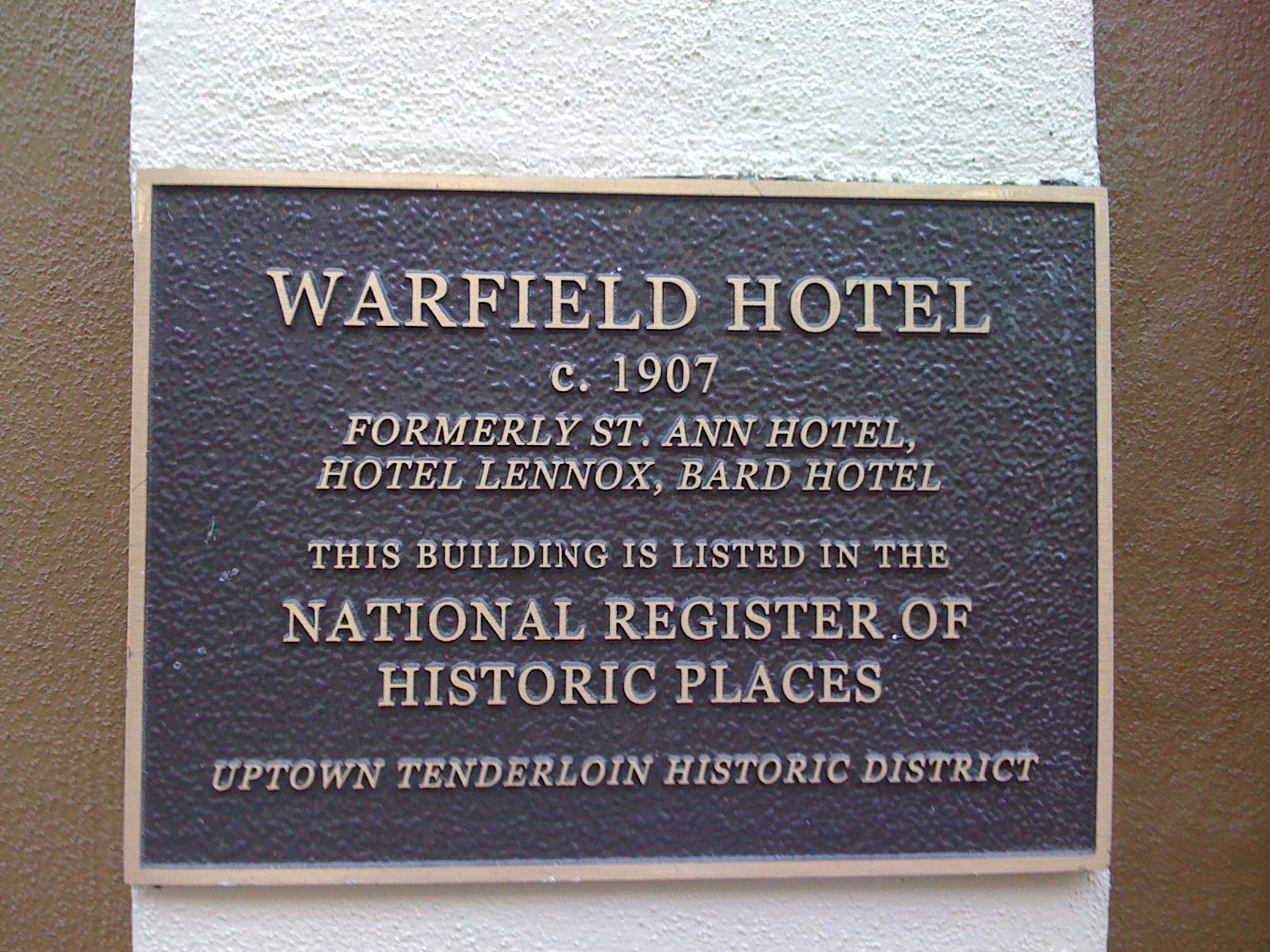
Warfield Hotel plaque, Uptown Tenderloin Historic District, National Register of Historic Places

Number	Name	List
18	National Historic Landmarks	See List
182	National Register of Historic Places	See List
3	ASCE Civil Engineering Landmarks	See List
3	ASME Mechanical Engineering Landmarks	See List

== State ==
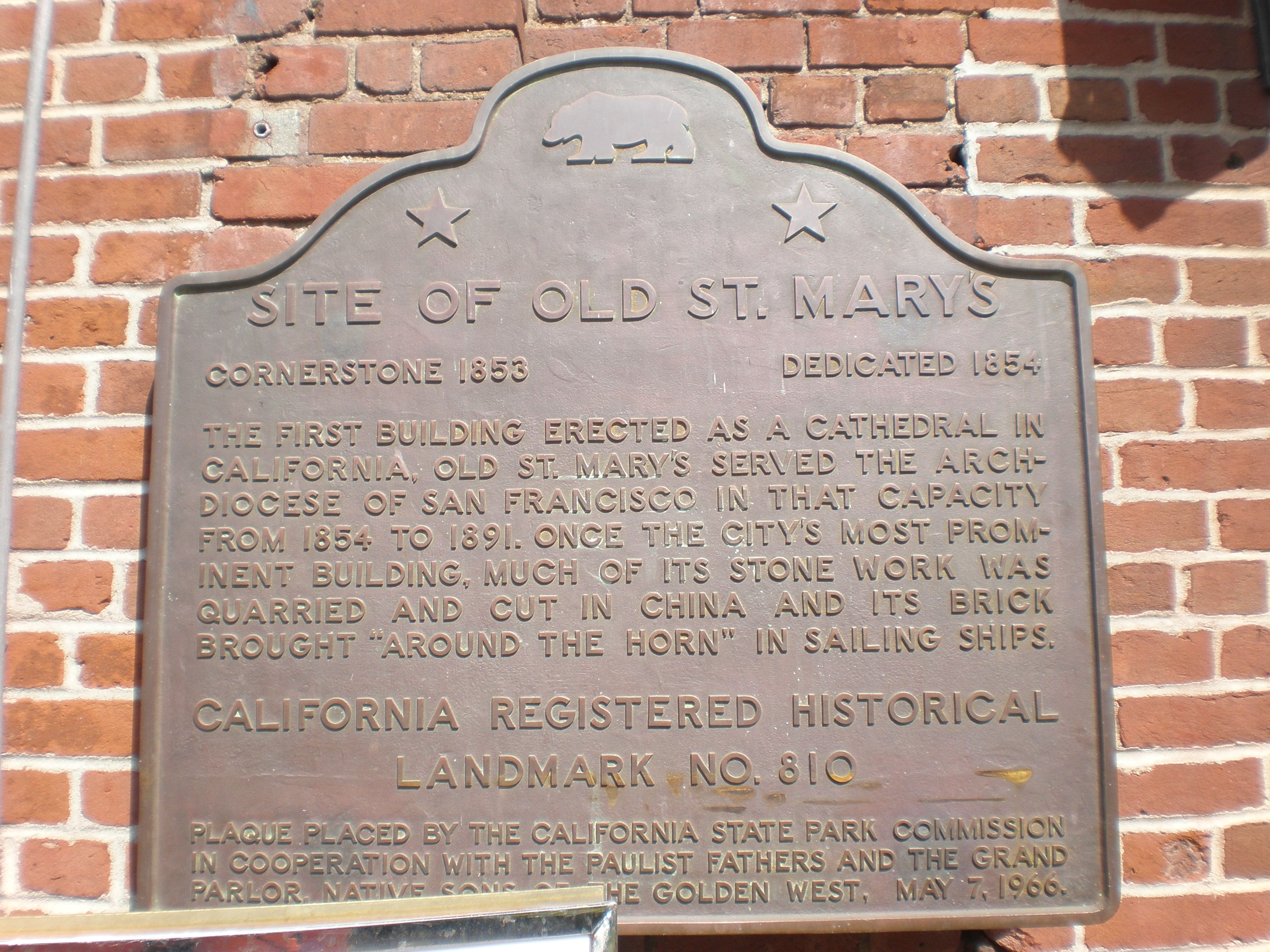
The Old Saint Mary's Cathedral California Historic Landmark plaque.

Number	Name	List
48	California Historical Landmarks	See List

== Local ==
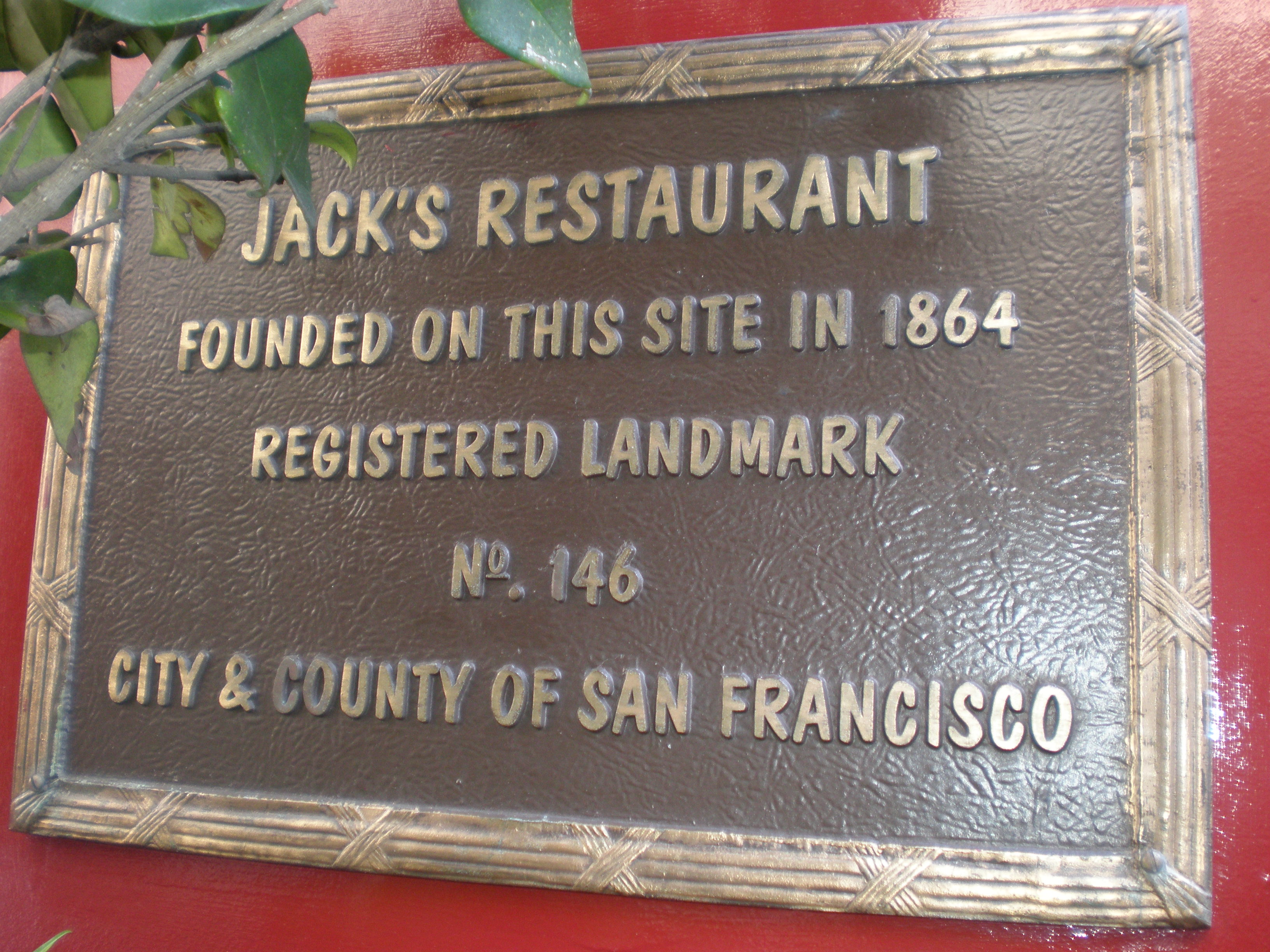
Jack's Restaurant San Francisco Designated Landmark plaque.

Number	Name	List
261	San Francisco Designated Landmarks	See List
12	San Francisco Landmark Districts	See List

== See also ==
- List of World Heritage Sites in the United States
- American Institute of Architects

== External Lists ==
- National Park Service National Historic Landmarks Program
- National Park Service National Register of Historic Places
- California State Parks Office of Historic Preservation
- San Francisco Planning Department Historic Preservation
