= Las Vegas High School Neighborhood Historic District =

Historic district in Nevada, United States

- U.S. National Register of Historic Places
- U.S. Historic district
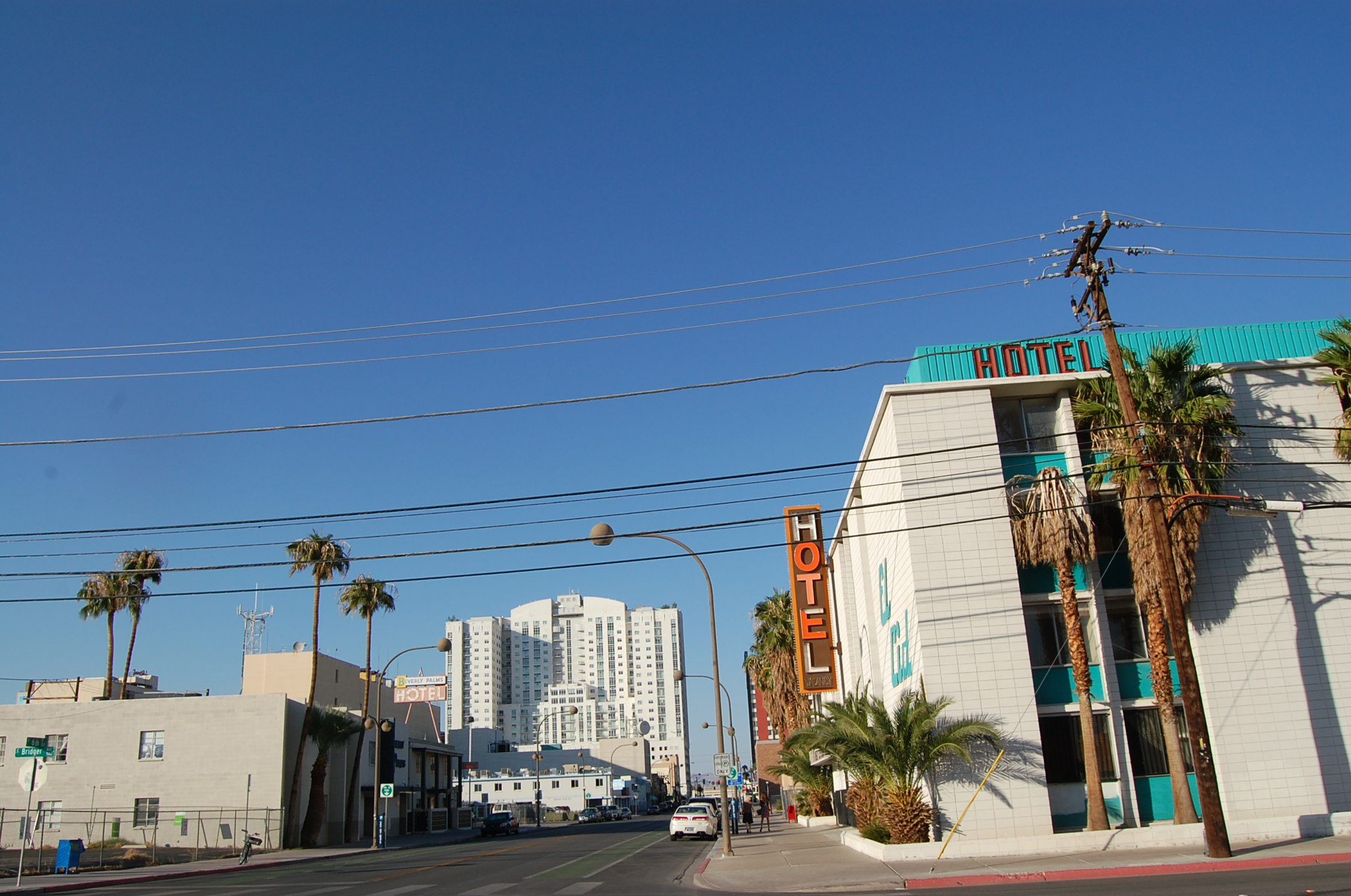

- Location within Nevada Location within the United States
- Location: E. Bridger, S. 9th, E. Gass and S. 6th Streets; Las Vegas, Nevada
- Coordinates: 36°9′44″N 115°8′23″W
- Architectural style: Pueblo
- NRHP reference No.: 90002204
- Added to NRHP: January 30, 1991

Las Vegas High School Neighborhood Historic District, is a historic district which was listed on the National Register of Historic Places in 1991. The Las Vegas High School Academic Building and Gymnasium, already listed on the National Register in 1986, is included as a contributing property within the district. That property was later expanded to include Fraser Hall in 2021 and to include the entire 15 acres (6.1 ha) campus of the Las Vegas High School in 2022.

When nominated, the area included 236 properties of which 4 were listed on the National Register of Historic Places and a total of 150 properties were contributing properties.

== Boundary ==
Gass Avenue to 6th Street to Garces Avenue to 8th Street to Garces Avenue, north to Clark Avenue to 8th Street to Bridger Avenue to Chef Andre Rochet Place West to 6th Street to Bonneville Avenue south to Garces Avenue, south and then east to 7th Street and back to Garces Avenue.
