= Bill Boyd (businessman) =

American businessman

- Born: William Samuel Boyd; November 4, 1931 (age 95); Los Angeles, California, U.S.
- Education: University of Nevada, Reno (BA); University of Utah College of Law (JD)
- Occupation: Businessman
- Known for: Former CEO of Boyd Gaming (1993–2008); Former executive chair of Boyd Gaming (2008–2023)
- Spouse: Judy Vieths
- Children: 3
- Parents: Sam Boyd (father); Mary Neuman (mother)

William Samuel Boyd (born November 4, 1931) is an American businessman and casino executive. With his father, Sam Boyd, he co-founded Boyd Gaming, which owns casinos in the Las Vegas Valley and other states. Boyd was chief executive officer of Boyd Gaming from 1993 to 2008 and was executive chair of its board of directors from 2008 to 2023. He appeared on the Forbes 400 list of the wealthiest Americans in the 1990s and had a net worth of over $2 billion in 2026.

Born in Los Angeles, Boyd spent his early years in California and Honolulu before his father moved the family to Las Vegas when Boyd was around 10 years old. He received a bachelor's degree in political science from the University of Nevada, Reno, and enrolled at the University of Utah College of Law. After being drafted into the United States Army in 1953, he served in Germany, was discharged in 1955, and returned to the Utah law school, where he received his law degree in 1957. Boyd co-founded a law firm and practiced law for 15 years.

After receiving a 10% stake in the Eldorado Casino through his legal work, Boyd joined forces with his father, Sam, and his aunt and uncle to acquire the casino and operate it like a family business. Bill and Sam joined a partnership on the Downtown Las Vegas casino Union Plaza in 1971, but sold their shares because of disagreements, and invested the proceeds from that sale into constructing the California Hotel and Casino, which catered to Hawaiian customers. The California's opening in 1975 prompted Boyd to leave his law practice and focus on the gaming industry. The Boyds founded their company at that time and opened Sam's Town Hotel and Gambling Hall in 1979, targeting the locals casino market. At the request of the Nevada Gaming Control Board, Boyd began managing the mob-run Stardust Resort and Casino in 1983 and acquired both the Stardust and the Fremont Hotel and Casino in 1985. In 1993, Boyd's company went public through an initial public offering, and Boyd acquired Main Street Station. He co-founded BankWest in 1994.

Boyd launched the Borgata Hotel Casino & Spa in Atlantic City, New Jersey, in 2003. He demolished the Stardust and planned to replace it with Echelon Place but the plan was shelved amid the Great Recession. Boyd was inducted into the Gaming Hall of Fame in 1993 and the Nevada Business Hall of Fame in 2005. In 2006, The Chronicle of Philanthropy listed Boyd among the top philanthropists in the United States. He has donated to the University of Nevada, Las Vegas, on multiple occasions, including a total of $30 million to establish the William S. Boyd School of Law. Boyd has donated to charities and local organizations in Southern Nevada.

== Early life, education, and legal career ==
William Samuel Boyd was born on November 4, 1931, to Sam and Mary Neuman in Los Angeles, California. His father was a Scotch-Irish American from Oklahoma. His mother, who was from Salt Lake City, had first gotten acquainted with his father in Long Beach, California. Boyd was their only child and was named after Sam's father, Bill, who had died of typhoid fever when Sam was nine years old. In the 1930s, Sam was employed on Southern California gambling vessels. Boyd spent his early years, from birth through kindergarten, in the Los Angeles and Long Beach region. He attended a Los Angeles Catholic school, where he received a rosary as a prize for recalling a detail from the Bible. After a different firm recruited Sam to manage illicit casinos on bingo ships in Hilo, Hawaii, he moved the family to Honolulu, where they resided between 1935 and 1940. Boyd learned how to swim in Hawaii. He lived in Honolulu while attending first and second grade. After the bingo ships were forced to close, Sam moved his family back to the Balboa Peninsula of Newport Beach, California, where he attended third and fourth grade.

With $80 (equivalent to $1,751 in 2025) to his name, in 1941 Sam brought Bill and Mary to Las Vegas, Nevada, where Bill was raised. At the time, Las Vegas had a single resort and under 9,000 people lived there. The family made their residence in a hotel situated on the Boulder Highway behind The Green Shack. Their home was close to land that would later be used to build the Showboat Hotel and Casino, and they had a party line that three neighboring families also used. Boyd said "People would say, 'Get off the phone'". Boyd's mother, father, and paternal aunt, Myrtie Lee, all worked as dealers at the Jackpot casino (located at the present-day Binion's Gambling Hall and Hotel). Every day, his father earned between $6 and $8. After receiving his paycheck in silver dollar coins, he would stack the coins on his dresser. Struck by the sight, Boyd said he thought they represented a fortune beyond imagination.

Boyd earned his first paycheck as a paperboy by selling copies of Las Vegas Evening Review-Journal in Downtown Las Vegas at casinos and on the street. Once the newspaper arrived, the boys collected around 20 copies. To signal the start of the frantic race to make sales, a supervisor discharged a starting pistol. Since his father worked as a dealer at the Jackpot casino, Boyd frequently sold his papers there. Both his mother and his father had never received a college education. As his parents raised him, they told him to become educated so that he could avoid following in his father's footsteps in becoming a dealer. Boyd attended Fifth Street School and graduated from Las Vegas High School in 1949. He attended the University of Nevada, Reno, where he received a political science bachelor's degree and decided in his third year to study law. While he was a university student, Boyd took on a summer job at the Cal-Neva Lodge, where he posted signs advertising the recently opened property and parked cars. On his weekends, Boyd was a "change boy" at Club Cal Neva in Reno, where he was responsible for making change for the players. His father had been the casino's operator in 1948, 1949, and 1952.

Boyd sought admission to two law schools: the Washington, D.C.–based Georgetown University Law Center and the Salt Lake City–based University of Utah College of Law. In 1952, he enrolled in the law school in Salt Lake City, drawn by the picturesque campus and the chance to enjoy the home cooking of his grandmother, who lived in the city. The law school dean cautioned Boyd's class on their first day to take note of their neighboring classmates and suggested that half would fail and not return the following year. Boyd earned passing in grades the first two quarters and was preparing for the third quarter's tests. He received a conscription letter from the United States government ordering him to begin his military service at Fort Ord in California. Boyd had been excused from military service during his last two years of college and initial law school year. The letter said he could appeal the conscription to the Reno-based draft board. Boyd had thought he could serve his country by entering the Judge Advocate General's Corps after graduating from law school. He communicated that but the draft board chair declined to exempt him, stating that he didn't think the Korean War was going to come to an end anytime soon.

Boyd reported to the United States Army and had completed a month of basic training when the Korean War concluded. After he finished his training, Boyd traveled for around six days on a boat to the German city of Bremerhaven, followed by a train to Munich. In that city, Boyd first served in the infantry and then became the legal clerk for a district of Munich. Boyd was in the military for two years and reached the rank of private first class. Since students were allowed to be discharged from the military three months ahead schedule, he submitted a request which was approved. Ending his service in 1955, he reenrolled at the Salt Lake City law school that year.

After receiving a law degree from the University of Utah College of Law in 1957, Boyd went back to Las Vegas, where he passed the bar exam and practiced law for 15 years. Boyd co-founded the law firm Boyd, Brennan & Leavitt with Jim Brennan and Myron E. Leavitt, and they worked together for around 10 years. Leavitt had been his classmate at Fifth Street School, was his roommate at university, and later was lieutenant governor of Nevada and state Supreme Court justice. During his time as a lawyer, Boyd largely worked in law firms that employed at most two or three people. Specializing in corporate law, he worked on leases for corporate real estate. Boyd also dealt with divorces, probate proceedings, wills.

== Business career ==
=== Eldorado, California, and founding of Boyd Group ===
Paul Perry, whom Boyd represented in his efforts to buy an unoccupied casino, preferred to use stock to cover his legal fees since he lacked the funds to remodel the property. The customer transferred a 10% stake in that property, Eldorado Casino, to Boyd in 1962. An additional 10% stake in the Eldorado Casino was acquired by his father, while additional partners, including Boyd's aunt and a lawyer he knew, acquired shares. In 1965, they made the Eldorado twice as large by purchasing the adjacent property, Royal Club. The father and son purchased their partners' shares in 1966 following the casino's surge in attention, after which the Eldorado Casino was managed like a family business by Boyd and his father, aunt, and uncle. After the police visited the Eldorado, checked the work permits of strippers, and found one lacking the documentation, they arrested Boyd. A judge struck the law down as unconstitutional after Boyd challenged the arrest. Whenever he filled out applications for gaming licenses years later, he had to answer yes to the question "Have you been arrested?"

In 1971, Boyd and his father joined a partnership with entities headed by Frank Scott, Jackie Gaughan, and J. K. Houssels Jr. that constructed the Downtown Las Vegas casino Union Plaza. Although he was working as a lawyer at the time, Boyd was the company secretary. He maintained his law office at a leased first-floor office in the Plaza. In 1971, after his father became the biggest owner of the hotel, The Plaza became the inaugural casino to employ an all-women blackjack dealing team. The father-and-son duo's focus on hiring women and African Americans drew criticism from employees in the gambling industry. The owners had conflicts over decision-making. That led to the duo exiting their Plaza investment by selling their shares to the remaining three investors for a gain. In 1974 or 1975, Boyd and his father founded the Boyd Group. The Boyds ploughed the profits from the Plaza sale into the California Hotel and Casino, a property they were operating and would debut in 1975. A 1% ownership stake in the California Hotel cost $20,000 (equivalent to $119,666 in 2025) to acquire. Boyd and his father bought 26.5% each. Thirty partners acquired the remaining portion. In its initial months, the casino struggled. But after it shifted its focus to catering to Hawaiians, the California found its footing. To devote his attention to the California when it launched, Boyd ended his law practice. He split his attention between the California and Eldorado, the casino he and his father had begun operating in 1962, seeking to familiarize himself with the casion industry's various operations.

=== Sam's Town, Stardust, and initial public offering ===
While commuting almost daily between the casinos on Boulder Highway, Boyd discovered a 5-acre (2.0 ha) tract of land listed for sale. His friend, a real estate agent, informed him that there was an adjoining 11-acre (4.5 ha) tract of land at the corner where Nellis Boulevard met Boulder Highway. Alongside his father, Boyd acquired the property. He had noticed it was midway between the California and the Eldorado and observed an increase in housing developments there. The tract of land cost $25 million, which the Memphis Flyer said was an extraordinary sum at the time. His company's board of directors encouraged the compan to construct a casino on the land instead of keeping it undeveloped. They opened Sam's Town Hotel and Gambling Hall at the location in 1979. The casino catered to the locals casino market in a less-traveled place and assisted in transforming the location into Las Vegas' third hub for gambling. Owing to diminished health, Sam Boyd began entrusting others with a large portion of the responsibility after the debut of Sam's Town. Bill Boyd over time assumed control over Boyd Gaming. There were uncomfortable moments during the handover. For entertainment at Sam's Town right after its launch, the father and son had conflicting opinions, according to Boyd Gaming director and vice president Chuck Ruthe. While Bill wanted a country-western band, Sam sought a topless band to match the entertainment at the California but eventually relented after a board meeting. In the 1970s, Boyd and his father frequently visited their three casinos: Sam's Town in Las Vegas Valley, the California in Downtown Las Vegas, and the Eldorado in Henderson. On his trips, Boyd held discussions with his staff and talked with customers.

Stardust Resort and Casino was run by the mob. The Nevada authorities cracked down on the Stardust proprietors whom they suspected of skimming because they wanted to clean up the gambling industry's reputation by driving organized crime out of casino management. A Nevada Gaming Control Board member called Boyd in December 1983 asking him and Boyd Gaming to manage the casino while the license was under review. Boyd agreed since the Stardust's 2,100 employees would have been unemployed had the authorities shut down the casino. Before 24 hours had passed from the call, he and his company assumed control of the Stardust's gambling operations, while the mob managed the hotel operations. According to Boyd, they initially entered "a very hostile environment" since the previous owners were unhappy about the state's involvement and considered the Stardust their property. Boyd said that having to oversee the casino alongside the mob was among the worst ordeals he ever endured. Around 1984, the Stardust's license was rescinded, which gave his company the opportunity to acquire it. Boyd Gaming spent $160 million in 1985 to purchase the Stardust and Fremont Hotel and Casino, another hotel with a mob affiliation. Twenty banks backed the loan, making it the biggest financing then for a private company in the gambling sector. Named after Boyd, William B's was a restaurant established in 1987 or 1988 in the Stardust that he frequented on a nearly weekly basis. Boyd set up an office on Industrial Road that was adjacent to the Stardust.

Boyd Gaming incorporated in 1988. That year, Sam Boyd became the board's honorary chairman when he retired, while Bill Boyd was named the board's chairman and the chief executive officer. After spending $50 million to enlarge and modernize the Stardust in 1988, he ploughed $135 million to build a hotel tower containing 1,166 rooms, a swimming pool, and a conference center that began operations in 1991. Sam Boyd died in 1993. Around four to five months after his father's death, Bill Boyd asked Jack Sheehan to edit the University of Nevada Press book The Players: The Men Who Made Las Vegas. The book recounted Las Vegas' history by focusing on the men who transformed the city, including Boyd's father. Bill Boyd was named to the Gaming Hall of Fame in September 1993. Later that year, the Boyd Group went public in October 1993 on the New York Stock Exchange under the ticker symbol BYD and was renamed the Boyd Gaming Corporation. Boyd said that he promised the company's 38 shareholders that he would continue to operate Boyd Gaming as a family business and would avoid "grow[ing] just for growth's sake". At the time of the public offering, his company had six casinos that brought in revenues exceeding $430 million and were budget-friendly gambling options.

=== Main Street Station ===
In the same month as its public offering, Boyd Gaming spent $16.5 million to acquire Main Street Station, a downtown hotel neighboring its California hotel. He ploughed $60 million into renovating the casino and reopened it in November 1996. Boyd invested significant effort in the 1990s in getting the downtown canopy Fremont Street Experience built. He thought the Fremont Street Experience had successfully attracted visitors to the downtown and he aimed to keep them there with Main Street Station, which targeted customers who were younger and more affluent. Boyd co-founded BankWest, a bank on Sahara Avenue that catered to small businesses, in May 1994. He had previously been on the Nevada State Bank board of directors. Boyd joined the board of directors of a lobbying association made up of nine publicly traded gaming companies. Established in May 1994, the association aimed to influence Washington, D.C. policymakers regarding gaming issues. Boyd invested $145 million into constructing Sam's Town Gambling Hall, Kansas City. Due to challenges posed by its geography, the casino did not do well and after two years was acquired by another company for $12.5 million. Owing to a decline of his company's shares in the stock market, Boyd fell off the Forbes 400, which in 1996 had a cutoff of $415 million (equivalent to $851,925,525 in 2025). In 1998, Boyd Gaming started pursuing diversification by expanding its presence across different regions and customer tiers.

Boyd spearheaded collective bargaining agreement talks with the Culinary Workers Union in July 2002. Initially, he had negotiated with them for the Fremont and Main Street Station, Boyd Gaming's downtown casinos, while Michael Gaughan did the same for his four casinos. Since the union had trouble coming to an agreement with the remaining downtown casinos, the two men's roles were expanded as they wanted to prevent a strike action that might have been devastating. The duo worked with the union, signaling their acceptance of more favorable terms for Binion's Horseshoe and a number of lower-tier casinos than for more well-off casinos like theirs. The Las Vegas Sun said it led to "the richest collective bargaining agreement ever reached downtown" with 11 casinos in the deal committing to raising every worker's pay and benefits by $2.20, spread across five years. In December 2002, Boyd was elected vice chairman of the American Gaming Association, a two-year position.

=== Borgata and Coast Casinos ===
Boyd became a billionaire after the stock price rose in the following 15 years after the IPO and turned his focus to constructing upscale casinos. Boyd launched the upscale casino Borgata Hotel Casino & Spa in Atlantic City, New Jersey, in 2003, coming after the city's 13-year drought in casino launches. He was drawn to build the Borgata after Steve Wynn, who had collaborated with him 10 years prior to improve Downtown Las Vegas's Fremont Street, called him in May 1996 with a proposal to build a casino there. Wynn suggested a joint venture in which MGM Resorts International would supply the land, while Boyd would run the casino after furnishing most of the money to construct it. Suzette Parmley of The Philadelphia Inquirer said in 2008 that from that point onward, the Borgata has been the blueprint for each casino operator entering the area. Spectrum Gaming Group's senior vice president Joe Weinert said that "Borgata reshaped Atlantic City" and that it shows "Bill Boyd's vision, and also his doggedness ... to see it through".

Boyd Gaming spent $1.3 billion to purchase Coast Casinos in 2004, which brought it four casinos in Las Vegas (Barbary Coast Hotel and Casino, Gold Coast Hotel and Casino, The Orleans, and Suncoast Hotel and Casino). Boyd negotiated the deal with Michael Gaughan, the owner, in 90 minutes at a Ruth's Chris Steak House. The two had been acquainted for 40 years, and their fathers, who were employees at the Flamingo Las Vegas, had known each other since the 1940s. The acquisition made Boyd Gaming the fourth-biggest firm in the gambling sector and enabled it to strengthen its position in the locals casino market beyond Sam's Town. The combined company had $2 billion in revenue, 33,200 employees, 17 resorts (11 in Las Vegas), and 9,050 hotel rooms (5,300 in Las Vegas). Analysts said the merger would allow Boyd to secure financing for the renovation of the Stardust Resort and Casino on its own. In June 2006, Gaughan met with Boyd to buy South Point, a casino Boyd Gaming had purchased from Coast Casinos, for around $576 million.

Boyd's casinos target gamblers seeking affordable options, who are largely nearby residents and middle-class tourists. Brian Sodoma of the Las Vegas Business Press wrote in 2003, "If Steve Wynn won the heart of Las Vegas by bringing to life wild ideas and ambitions, Bill Boyd is his antithesis, a patient thinker, observer, and quiet mover and shaker." Sodoma said that during the Las Vegas Strip's rise in the 1990s as an entertainment giant, Boyd refrained from getting involved. He channeled his funds into the company's Downtown Las Vegas properties (the California, the Fremont, and Main Street Station), and continued upgrading his Boulder Strip property, Sam's Town. Sam's Town opened the restaurant Willy & Jose's Cantina, which offers Mexican food and honors Boyd and the company's general manager, Joe Viscuglia.

In 2004, Boyd was ranked fourth in compensation for executives working at Las Vegas public companies, having earned $28.8 million. In 2006, Boyd had a net worth of around $1.6 billion. He had grown his company into a gaming giant ranked third globally in 2006. With a presence in Illinois, Indiana, Louisiana, Mississippi, Nevada, and New Jersey, the company had holdings totaling $5 billion in value. In 2005, Boyd was named to the Nevada Business Hall of Fame. At the 2006 Las Vegas International Hotel and Restaurant Show, Boyd was named the Nevada Hotelier of the Year. Boyd was among the two biggest shareholders in Western Alliance Bancorporation, a holding company for banks including the Bank of Nevada, which went public in 2005.

=== Echelon Place, casino acquisitions, and retirement ===
In 2006, Boyd resolved to demolish the Stardust and replace it with Echelon Place, which would cost $4.8 billion. Boyd said at an event for the Asian, Latin, and Urban chambers of commerce in 2006 that diversity in the workforce was "more than just the right thing to do" in that it helped the company boost job satisfaction, brought it more competitive advantage, and strengthened the company's profits. At the event, Boyd pledged that for companies in Clark County owned by minorities and women that became members of those chambers of commerce he would provide a $500 matching contribution. Boyd further said that to bridge the competitive gap between large industry players and the small businesses run by minorities on its Echelon Place project, Boyd Gaming would offer every contractor workers' compensation and commercial general liability insurance. When the Stardust was imploded in 2007, Boyd's four sixth-grade grandsons—Taylor, Joseph, and William Boyd and Sean Johnson—pressed the switch to set off the explosives. Boyd gave between $1,000 and $10,000 in severance pay to laid-off Stardust employees, depending on tenure. Employees who had worked for over 20 years received $10,000, while people employed for under one year received $1,000.

Like the Borgata, which had opened in 2003, the Echelon Place was intended to offer a more upscale casino experience than the company's other properties. The Forbes writer Abram Brown noted that the two casinos' development plans were executed at a particularly inopportune moment because the markets in Atlantic City and Las Vegas had become crowded and the Great Recession had begun. In the midst of the recession, Boyd Gaming's stock price would drop to 94% by November 2008. Acknowledging that his decisions had contributed to the company's troubles, Boyd decided to bring on a CEO who was less of a risk-taker than he was. Boyd Gaming announced in July 2007 that Boyd would step down from his CEO role at Boyd Gaming on January 1, 2008. In his last year as CEO, the company had 17 casinos spanning seven states and an annual revenue of $2 billion, positioning it as the fourth-biggest American gaming firm, after Harrah's Entertainment, MGM Mirage, and Penn National Gaming. His family that year held 36% of Boyd Gaming's shares outstanding. He became the company's executive chairman, while Keith Smith, the company's president, stepped into the position of CEO. In his new role, Boyd focused on meeting with customers and leading casual 60-minute talks to introduce workers to Boyd Gaming's history. He attended the opening of the $130 million hotel tower for Blue Chip Casino, Hotel and Spa in Michigan City, Indiana, in 2009. Boyd told the Las Vegas Review-Journal in 2007 that beginning in 2000, he had been preparing a succession plan and that "I felt, after 32 years as either president or CEO, it was time to do something else." During the Great Recession, Boyd wrote a column in the company newsletter Boyd Buzz to share details with employees.

Boyd and Smith decided to stop construction on the Echelon in 2008, having already spent $1 billion on the property with an estimate of at least five times that to finish it. Similarly, after the Borgata lost nearly 33% of its revenue, Boyd and Smith chose to sell Boyd Gaming's 50% interest in the property in 2016 for $900 million to MGM Mirage. After scrapping his upscale casino projects to avert bankruptcy, Boyd shifted his focus toward growing the company's ownership of affordable casinos in rural communities instead of competing in Las Vegas's saturated market. He had become unwilling to commit to the financial uncertainty needed to construct new casinos. Smith, his CEO, counseled him that building properties would deplete their recently restored cash flow. They chose to expand the business by buying established casinos that were market leaders in their communities. Between 2012 and 2018, Boyd Gaming invested $2.9 billion into buying 13 casinos. In 2018, Boyd got together multiple times weekly with Smith. They smoked Churchill cigars at an unoccupied card table to discuss business. Between November 2008 and December 2018, the stock of Boyd Gaming increased by 700%, nearly three times as large as the gain of the S&P 500. The surge brought Boyd's net worth to over $700 million, putting him close to reclaiming his billionaire status.

Boyd was CEO from 1993 to 2008 and executive chair from 2008 to 2023. After he opted not to stand for reelection, Boyd's tenure as co-executive chairman concluded in May 2023. He stopped being a board member and was given the role of chairman emeritus. Forbes named Boyd 106th on its list of 250 "most successful living veterans" in 2026. According to the magazine, Boyd with his family had a net worth of $2.3 billion in 2026, making them the 1,560th-richest in the world.

== Philanthropy ==
Boyd made donations to charities and local groups in Southern Nevada. He had a connection to a board member of radio station KNPR who in the late 1970s approached Boyd and his father to request space on the property where they were developing Sam's Town Hotel and Gambling Hall to house their station. Boyd agreed to rent out a quarter-acre section along the boundary of Sam's Town for a term of 20 years. When a bank refused to give the station a loan to construct a building, Boyd guaranteed a $200,000 loan. In March 1980, the station began broadcasting from the Las Vegas Silver Bowl, a football stadium that was later renamed Sam Boyd Stadium to commemorate Boyd's father. In December 1980, the station start operating from its recently constructed building. In 1984, Boyd gave the University of Nevada, Las Vegas (UNLV) $1.5 million to fund the installation of new artificial turf at the stadium. During the tenure of UNLV president Robert Maxson, he contributed $500,000 to help cover the over $8.4 million cost of building residence halls at the university. Boyd thought it was important to have the dormitories to reassure parents aware of the city's partying reputation.

In the 1990s, Nevada had been the final state in the contiguous United States lacking a law school with around 500 Nevada students leaving the state to pursue law degrees. According to Boyd, he was required to enroll at the University of Utah College of Law for that reason. Since many University of Utah College of Law students move to Nevada, Boyd gave $80,000 to the Utah school to fund a gambling law class. Boyd said he wanted to help Nevada students who faced financial barriers to attending law school, noting that studying in their home state made it more affordable. Alongside Kenny Guinn, who was running in the 1998 Nevada gubernatorial election, Boyd traveled to Carson City, the state capital, to ask lawmakers to support creating a Nevada law school. In August 1996, he provided $5 million in unrestricted funding to start UNLV's William S. Boyd School of Law. His donation spurred other people to give $2 million to the law school and won the backing in 1997 of the Governor of Nevada and the Nevada Legislature for the school, which enrolled students the following year. Via his businesses, Boyd donated an additional $500,000 to the law school by 2005. Don Snyder, Boyd Gaming's president and a UNLV Foundation member, persuaded Boyd to directly make an additional gift of $25 million to the law school in 2005. Boyd said he did so because the law school's progress had stalled and additional investment would boost its performance. The donations were unrestricted and would be distributed in 25 yearly payments of $1 million each. University officials aimed to use it to compensate faculty members and guest lecturers and finance scholarships for students. To accommodate the working hours of casino employees, Boyd asked the law school to make evening courses available. By 2005, Boyd had also given $1 million to fund a UNLV William F. Harrah College of Hospitality endowment. In 2015, he donated $2.5 million to construct another building for the hospitality college.

After the 1995 Oklahoma City bombing, Boyd gave the American Red Cross $25,000. Boyd, as well as Boyd Gaming and the Boyd Foundation, has given substantial sums to the American Heart Association. In 1998, the Anti-Defamation League's local chapter gave him a Distinguished Community Service Award. During the 1998 United States Senate election in Nevada, he contributed $1,000 to incumbent senator Harry Reid's campaign. After listening to Ed Rendell speak at a fundraiser, Boyd gave the Democratic Governors Association $50,000 in 2005. During the 2000 United States House of Representatives elections in Nevada, he gave $1,000 to congresswoman Shelley Berkley. Boyd gave $1 million in 2021 for the new signs at Harry Reid International Airport, which was being renamed from McCarran International Airport.

Alongside seven other companies, Boyd Gaming contributed $25,000 in seed money for establishing the National Center for Responsible Gaming in 1996. He previously was the center's president. Boyd became part of the center's executive leadership team and was its president in 2004. The Chronicle of Philanthropy listed Boyd among the United States' top philanthropists in 2006. According to the Las Vegas Review-Journal, the gambling sector and Las Vegas have a limited reputation for charitable giving, and Boyd was the only Las Vegas resident and gambling executive on the list. In its justification, The Chronicle of Philanthropy noted that Boyd had donated $25 million to the UNLV law school and had also donated to the Las Vegas Performing Arts Center, the Boys & Girls Clubs of Las Vegas, and the Henderson Boys & Girls Clubs. Boyd was a board member of Three Square, a food bank based in Las Vegas, in 2007.

== Personal life ==
Forbes reported that Boyd has been divorced. Boyd is married to Judy Vieths, his partner since around 1984. He had three children, eight grandchildren, and a great-grandchild in 2016. His three children are in upper management at Boyd Gaming: Sam J. Boyd (a Sam's Town executive host), Marianne Boyd Johnson (senior vice president and member of the board of directors), and William R. Boyd (a vice president starting in 1990 and member of the board of directors). Boyd, along with Marianne and William, owned around 26% of the company's stock in 2018. Boyd Johnson became the executive chair of the board in 2023. She is the namesake for Mariana's, a Latin-influenced steakhouse at Eldorado Casino. Boyd's first cousin, Bobby Neuman, was the general manager at Sam's Town in 1997. His grandson, Sam Boyd Jr., was an HR executive at Boyd Gaming in 2018.

Boyd remained in one residence for 40 years. In the 2010s, he relocated to a home nearer his company's office. After Boyd Gaming's stock market debut in 1993, Boyd as of 2018 had not parted with any of his shares. Boyd likes steak, Mexican cuisine, works by John Grisham, and the Los Angeles Dodgers. He enjoys cigars, wears bifocals, and owns a gold pinky ring covered in diamonds. He owns a Mercedes-Benz sedan bearing vanity plates that say "ECHELON" in reference to the never-finished casino project. When his daughter, Marianne, asked him why he did not get new vanity plates, Boyd responded, "It just reminds me that everything doesn't always go perfect." Boyd regularly watches the UNLV Runnin' Rebels basketball team's home court games from a courtside seat.

Amy S. Rosenberg of Knight Ridder Tribune Business News described Boyd as "soft-spoken" and "gentlemanly", while Las Vegas Sun columnist Jeff Simpson found him to be "affable" and "soft-spoken". The Star-Ledger reporter Julia DeHaven called Boyd "quiet and unassuming" and said he is frequently characterized as a father figure, including by Wall Street analysts.

== Bibliography ==
- Beck, Matthias; Toms, Steven (2009). Mallin, Christine A. (ed.). Corporate Social Responsibility: A Case Study Approach. Cheltenham: Edward Elgar Publishing. pp. 183–184. ISBN 978-1-84844-043-2 – via Google Books.
- Moehring, Eugene P. (2007). The University of Nevada, Las Vegas: A History. Reno, Nevada: University of Nevada Press. p. 132. ISBN 978-0-87417-709-1 – via Google Books.
- Odessky, Dick (2010) [1999]. Fly on the Wall: Recollections of Las Vegas' Good Old, Bad Old Days. Las Vegas: Huntington Press. p. 176. ISBN 978-1-935396-21-5 – via Google Books.
- "The Oral History of William S. Boyd, Executive Chairman of Boyd Gaming Corporation". UNLV Gaming Law Journal. 4. William S. Boyd School of Law: 145–174. 2013. Archived from the original on 2025-03-31.
- Sheehan, Jack (1997). "Sam Boyd's Quiet Legacy". In Sheehan, Jack (ed.). The Players: The Men Who Made Las Vegas. Reno, Nevada: University of Nevada Press. pp. 104–119. ISBN 0-87417-306-X – via Internet Archive.
