= Golden Arm (disambiguation) =

Golden Arm is a term used in craps.

Golden Arm may also refer to:

- "The Golden Arm", a folk tale
- Golden Arm (film), 2020 American comedy film
- Johnny Unitas Golden Arm Award, in American college football

== See also ==
- Golden Arms, a stage name used by American rapper U-God
- The Man with the Golden Arm, American film
- The Man with the Golden Arm (novel)
- James Harrison (blood donor), also known as the Man with the Golden Arm
- Kid with the Golden Arm, 1979 Hong Kong martial arts film
