= California Hotel and Casino =

Hotel and casino in Nevada, United States

Coordinates: 36°10′23″N 115°8′40″W

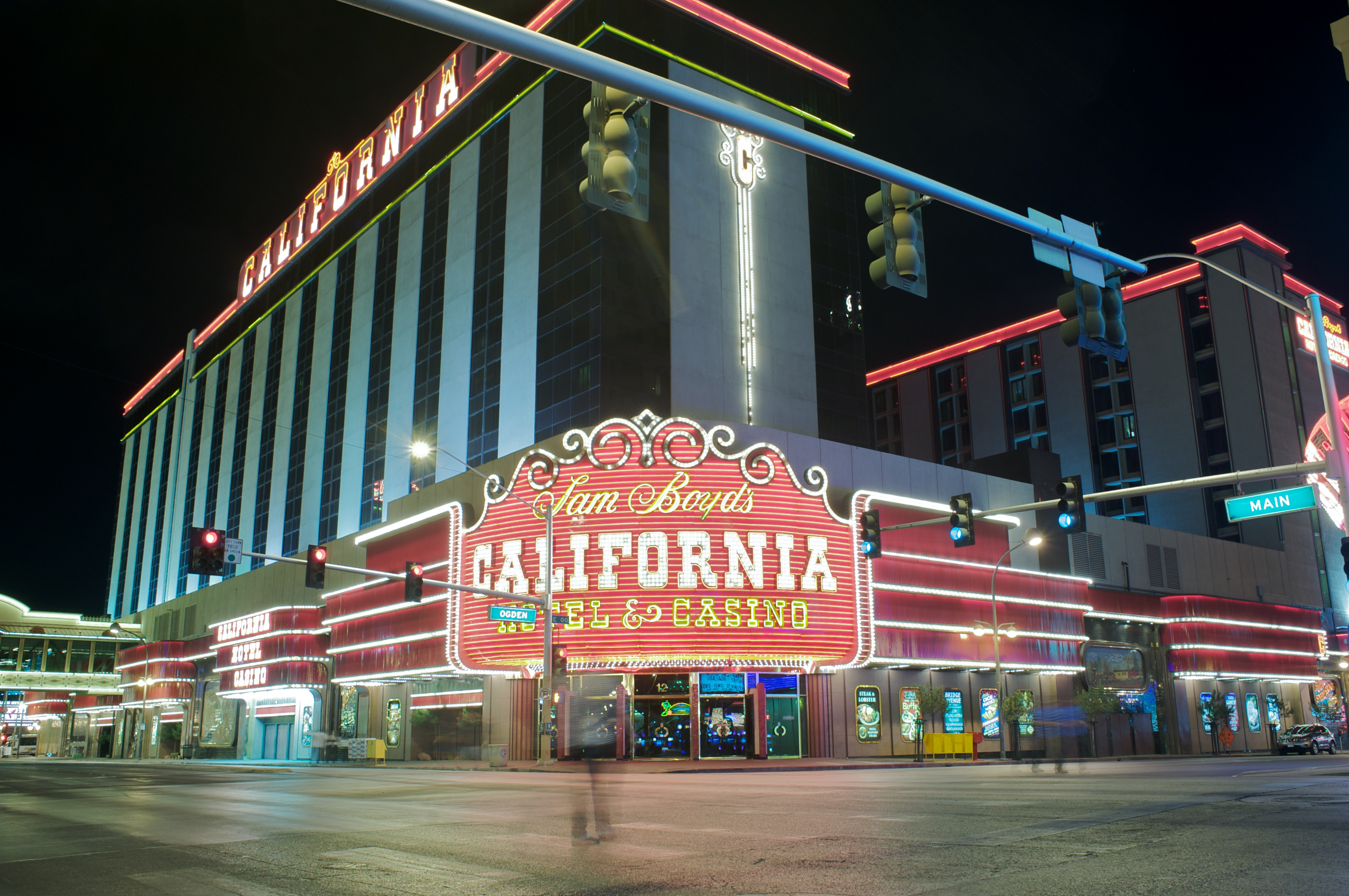
- The California and its newer west tower (left) in 2009

- Location within Downtown Las Vegas Location within Nevada
- Interactive map of California Hotel and Casino
- Location: Las Vegas, NV 89101; 12 East Ogden Avenue
- Opened: January 1, 1975; 51 years ago
- Theme: Hawaiian
- No. of rooms: 781
- Gaming space: 35,848 sq ft (3,330.4 m^{2})
- Casino type: Land-based
- Owner: Boyd Gaming
- Renovated in: 1982, 1984, 1994, 2016–17
- Website: www.thecal.com

The California Hotel and Casino (also known as The Cal) is located in downtown Las Vegas, Nevada. The hotel casino is owned by Boyd Gaming. It opened on January 1, 1975, with 325 rooms in an 11-story hotel. A 14-story west tower was added in 1984, and was extended a decade later, bringing the room count to 781.

Despite its name, the California is a Hawaiian-themed property and caters largely to Hawaiian residents through vacation packages.

== History ==
The California is owned by Boyd Gaming, and was the company's first property in downtown Las Vegas. It was developed by a group of stockholders led by Sam Boyd, who held 25 percent ownership. His son, Bill Boyd, held another 25 percent.

The 11-story hotel tower was topped off in September 1974. Built at a cost of $10 million, the California opened on January 1, 1975, with 325 rooms. The casino also featured two restaurants and an entertainment lounge.

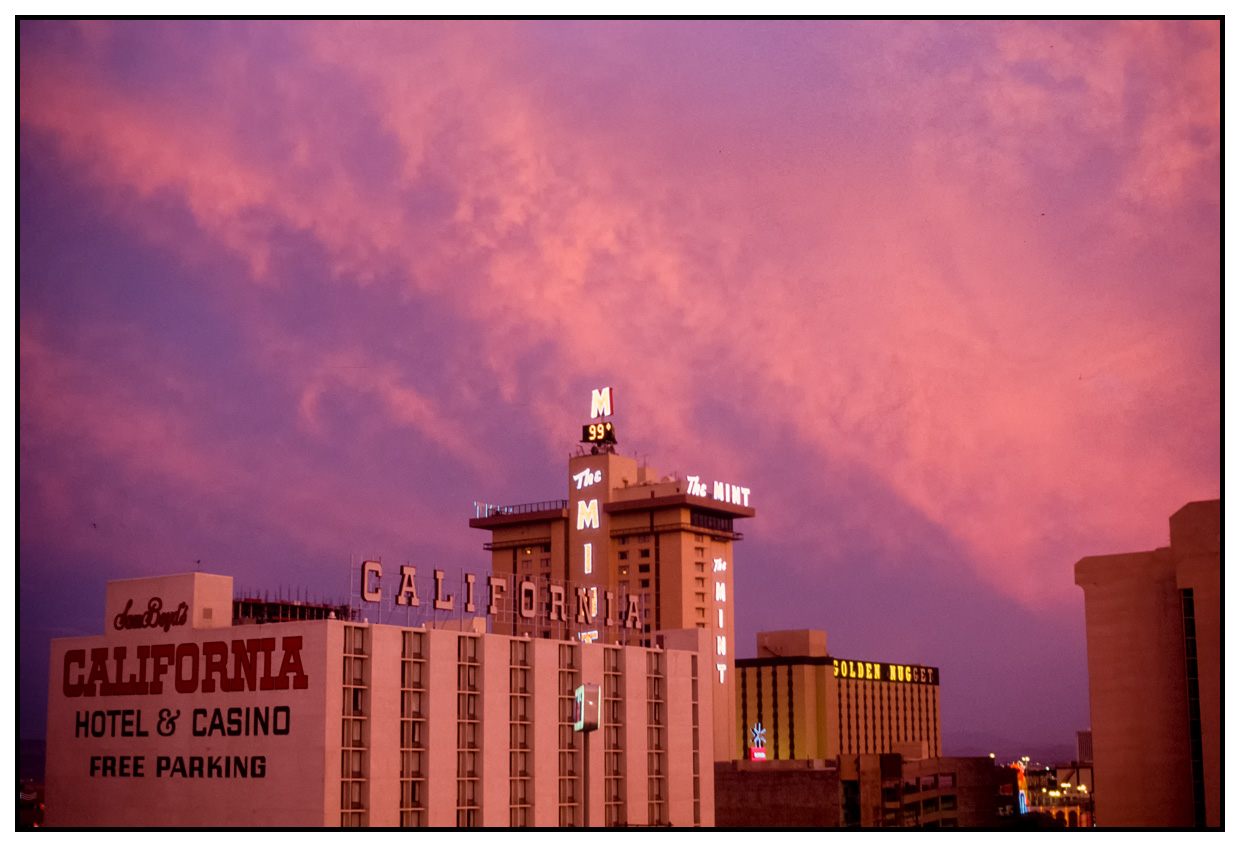
The original hotel tower circa 1981

A $1 million renovation took place in 1982; it included hotel and restaurant remodeling. The project also added a neon sign that wraps around the casino's lower exterior, from 1st Street to Ogden Avenue. The hotel tower was topped with a lighted parapet.

Another hotel tower was added in 1984, along with a six-story parking garage. The new tower is 14 stories, and was built west of the original tower.

In 1989, the California designated the term "Golden Arm", after Stanley Fujitake rolled dice for three hours and six minutes in craps without losing.

An addition was made to the second tower's north end in 1994, bringing the room count to 781. Also added was an enclosed walkway over Main Street, leading to Boyd's newly purchased Main Street Station property, which the company reopened in 1996.

A norovirus outbreak began at the California in December 2003, and more than 1,500 cases were reported over the next three months. A Boyd executive believed that norovirus only accounted for 284 cases, with the remainder caused by similar illnesses such as the flu.

The California underwent a remodel in 2016, which included a new bar and a sports lounge. The Redwood Grill was updated as well and renamed the Redwood Steakhouse. Hotel room renovations continued into 2017. The California includes 35,848 sq ft (3,330.4 m^{2}) of gaming space.

== Hawaiian appeal ==
Despite its name, the California features Hawaiian design elements, and has long targeted Hawaiians as a key demographic. Boyd was a former resident of Hawaii, where gambling is illegal. After facing slow business initially, Boyd soon began focusing on the Hawaiian market, offering Hawaiian food and encouraging a more casual atmosphere. He introduced vacation packages from the islands, with charter airfares as low as $9.90. The travel packages bring in most of the California's guests.

Hawaiians made up 70 percent of the property's clientele as of 1985. A decade later, the California was receiving 200,000 annual visitors from Hawaii. As of 2006, Boyd Gaming was charting 10,000 Hawaiian tourists to Las Vegas each month, and they made up 80 percent of the California's guests. Boyd's Hawaiian marketing, which later extended to the Fremont and Main Street properties, is credited with helping to build a large Hawaiian community in Las Vegas, earning it a nickname as the Ninth Island. As of 2012, an estimated 80-90% of Hawaiian visitors to Las Vegas stay at a Boyd property. The Hawaiian theme was modernized during the 2016 renovation. In 2020, murals which were painted in 1985 depicting the California gold rush were replaced with those depicting Hawaiian landscaping, and more vibrant colors were added as accents on the hotel's paint scheme.
