= The Pass Casino =

Casino in Henderson, Nevada

Coordinates: 36.032058°N 114.983296°W

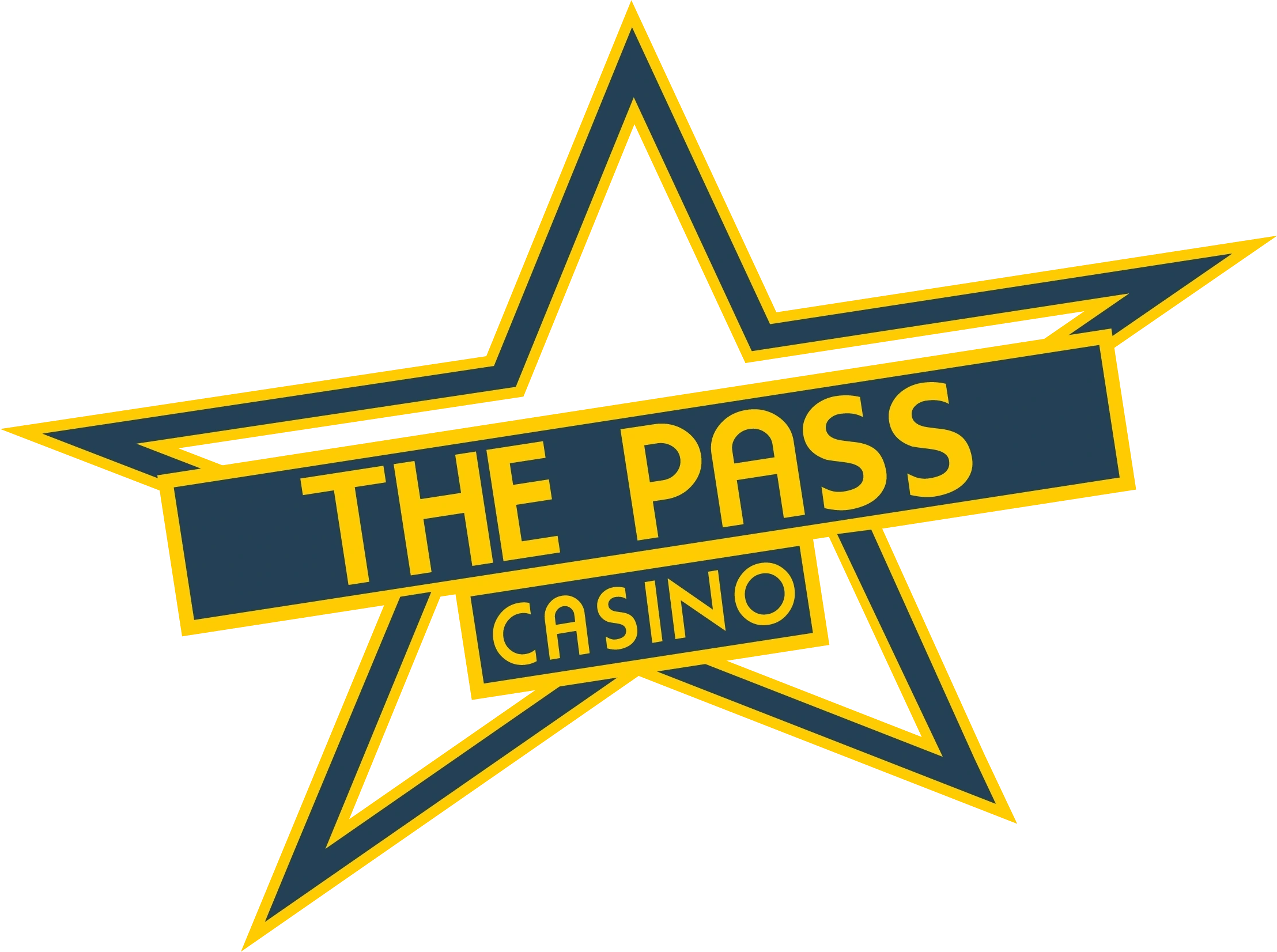

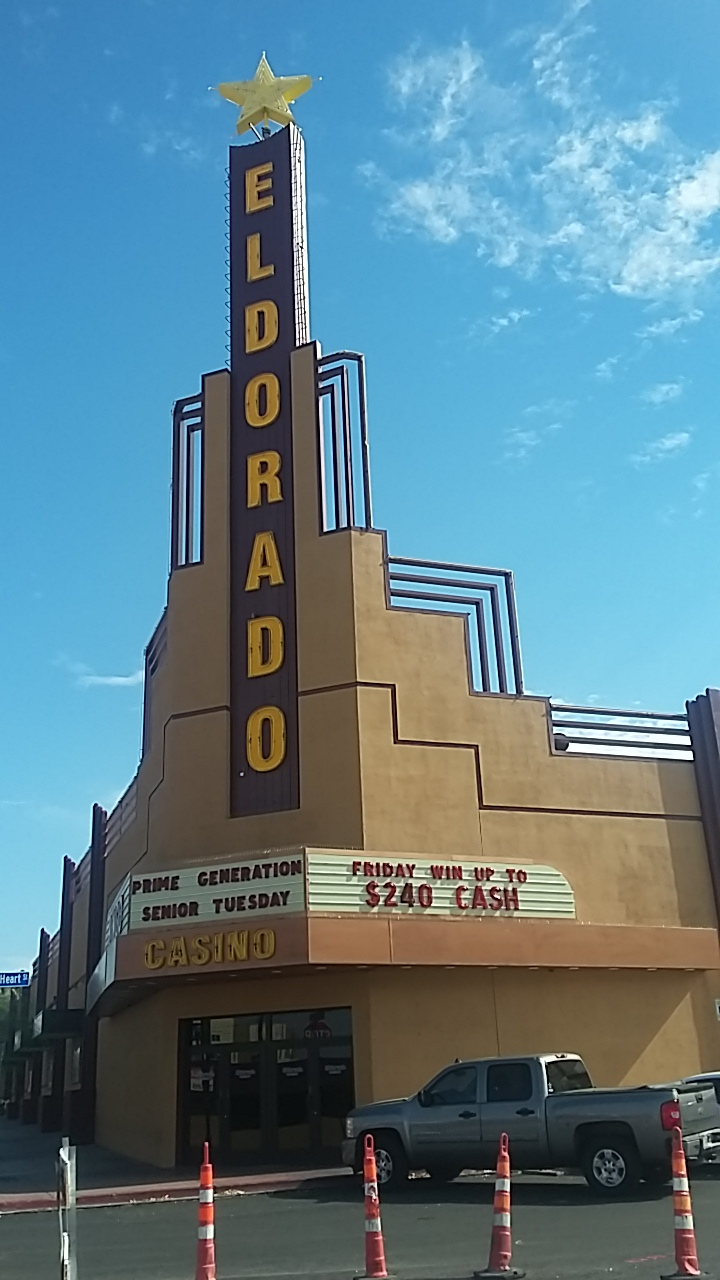
- Eldorado in 2017
- Interactive map of The Pass Casino
- Location: Henderson, Nevada, U.S.; 140 S Water Street
- Opened: February 15, 1961; 65 years ago
- Gaming space: 17,756 sq ft (1,649.6 m^{2})
- Notable restaurants: Ristorante Italiano; Emilia's Cafe
- Casino type: Land-based
- Owner: DeSimone Gaming
- Previous names: Wheel Casino (1961–62); Eldorado Casino (1962–2021)
- Renovated in: 2007, 2021
- Website: passcasino.com

The Pass Casino, formerly the Eldorado Casino, is a casino in the Water Street District, located in downtown Henderson, Nevada. It is owned and operated by DeSimone Gaming. First opened in 1961, it was owned by Boyd Gaming from 1993 to 2020.

The casino has over 350 slot machines, 6 table games, and a sportsbook.

== History ==
The property opened as the Wheel Casino on February 15, 1961.

By 1962, the Wheel was closed, and Paul Perry agreed to buy it. Attorney Bill Boyd represented him in the transaction, in exchange for a stake in the property. Boyd brought in other investors: a fellow lawyer, his aunt, and his father, Sam Boyd, general manager of the Mint. They reopened it as the Eldorado Casino on July 1.

Around 1965, they acquired the adjacent Royal Club, doubling the Eldorado's size.

The Boyds took over ownership in 1966. Sam bought half of the property for $6,667 and Bill bought a quarter for $3,000, while another of the original investors, Joe Crowley kept the remaining quarter, until he was later bought out. The Boyds tried to emphasize Henderson's small-town feel in operating the casino.

A $1.5-million renovation in 1977 expanded the casino to 30,000 square feet (2,800 m^{2}), to keep up with the town's growth.

Boyd Gaming acquired the casino in 1993. The company used it as a training ground for executives, because its small size requires a hands-on management approach.

In the mid-2000s, Boyd Gaming spent $3 million on renovations.

In March 2020, the state's casinos were ordered to close due to the COVID-19 pandemic in Nevada. In December 2020, Boyd agreed to sell the closed casino to DeSimone Gaming, the parent company of the Railroad Pass Casino. The Eldorado reopened as The Pass Casino on April 1, 2021. DeSimone had spent $7 million on a 45-day renovation which added various amenities, including two new restaurants, two bars, and event space. The Mexican restaurant became Italian, and the 1950s diner became a cafe. The casino had over 350 gaming machines, 80 percent of which were new. A new sportsbook was also added, and was opened on April 29, 2021. It is operated by Circa Sports.

In March 2022, DeSimone announced plans to build a 90-room Atwell Suites hotel in the casino's parking lot, while an existing parking garage will continue to serve the property. It would be the first hotel to open in the Water Street District, and also the second Atwell Suites location to open, in partnership with IHG Hotels & Resorts. Construction began in February 2023.
