= Mary Berkheiser =

American lawyer and professor

Mary E. Berkheiser is an American lawyer, currently the Joyce Mack Professor of Law at William S. Boyd School of Law, University of Nevada, Las Vegas.
