= Linda Berger =

American lawyer and professor

Academic background
- Education: University of Colorado; Boulder (BS); Case Western Reserve University (JD)

Academic work
- Discipline: Law
- Sub-discipline: Legal writing
- Institutions: University of Nevada, Las Vegas; University of San Diego; Thomas Jefferson School of Law

Linda L. Berger is an American legal scholar working as an emeritus professor at the William S. Boyd School of Law of the University of Nevada, Las Vegas.

== Education ==
Berger earned a Bachelor of Science degree in journalism and general studies from the University of Colorado Boulder in 1970 and a Juris Doctor from the Case Western Reserve University School of Law in 1985.

== Career ==
From 1989 to 1993, Berger worked as a lawyering skills professor at the University of San Diego School of Law. Berger joined the Thomas Jefferson School of Law in 1993, working as an assistant professor, then associate professor, and finally professor until 2008. Berger worked as the Family Foundation Professor of Law at the William S. Boyd School of Law from 2011 to 2019 and associate dean of faculty development and research from 2015 to 2015. She became a professor emeritus in 2020.
