= Echelon Place =

Proposed project on the Las Vegas Strip

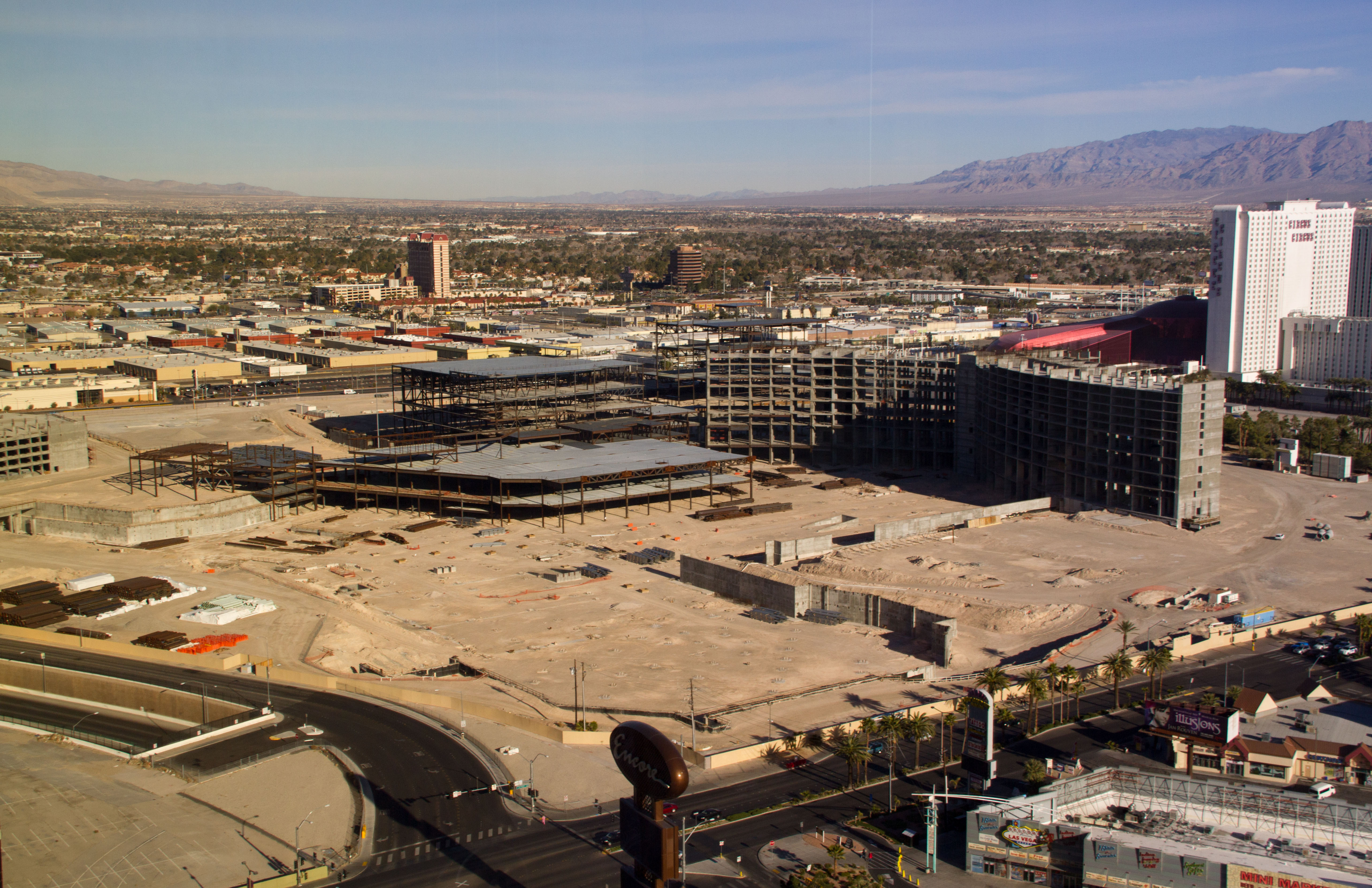
- Echelon Place construction site, February 2013
- Interactive map of Echelon Place
- Location: Winchester, Nevada, U.S.; South Las Vegas Boulevard; 36°8′1″N 115°9′57″W
- Opened: Never opened; originally planned for 2010
- No. of rooms: 5,300
- Gaming space: 140,000 sq ft (13,000 m^{2})
- Casino type: Land-based
- Owner: Boyd Gaming

Echelon (originally Echelon Place) was a proposed $4.8 billion mixed-use project that was to be built on the Las Vegas Strip in Winchester, Nevada. Boyd Gaming announced the project in January 2006, as a replacement for its Stardust Resort and Casino. Echelon Place, to be built on 63 acres (25 ha), was to include a 140,000 sq ft (13,000 m^{2}) casino, 4 hotels providing 5,300 rooms, 25 restaurants and bars, and the 650,000 sq ft (60,000 m^{2}) Las Vegas ExpoCenter. Echelon Place was also to include the $2.9 billion Echelon Resort, with 3,300 hotel rooms. Other hotels were also to include a Shangri-La Hotel and two hotels by Morgans Hotel Group: a Delano Hotel and a Mondrian Hotel. The project was also to include a $500 million shopping promenade, to be co-developed and managed by General Growth Properties.

The Stardust was closed in November 2006, and subsequently demolished. Groundbreaking for the Echelon project occurred on June 19, 2007, with an opening scheduled for the third quarter of 2010. However, construction was suspended on August 1, 2008, as Morgans Hotel Group and General Growth Properties could not obtain financing for their portions of the project, due to the effects of the Great Recession. As of 2012, Boyd Gaming still intended to finish construction of the project, and received a six-year extension from the county. However, in March 2013, Boyd Gaming sold the site to the Genting Group, which began developing it as a 3,500-room hotel and casino named Resorts World Las Vegas. Some of the unfinished Echelon buildings were incorporated into the Resorts World project, which opened on June 24, 2021.

== History ==
In the late 1990s, Boyd Gaming postponed plans to redevelop the site of its Stardust Resort and Casino on the Las Vegas Strip, to instead proceed with its Borgata hotel-casino in Atlantic City, New Jersey. After the Borgata opened in 2003, Boyd Gaming stated that it would wait until the 2005 opening of nearby competitor Wynn Las Vegas before starting a redevelopment plan for the Stardust site. While no specific plans had been considered for the site up to that time, future redevelopment possibilities would include demolishing the Stardust or building an adjacent resort on property located behind the Stardust. In November 2004, Boyd Gaming purchased a 13-acre parcel of land for $43 million, as part of its eventual redevelopment plans for the Stardust site. The 13-acre property was occupied by a 639-room Budget Suites hotel, and was contiguous to the Stardust. The sale gave Boyd Gaming a total of 63 acres (25 ha), and the company was in the early stages of a master plan for the site. Boyd Gaming used the Borgata as an example of how to redevelop the Stardust site.

Boyd Gaming announced the $4 billion Echelon Place project on January 3, 2006, to replace the Stardust. It would be a mixed-use project similar to Project CityCenter, also on the Las Vegas Strip. Echelon Place would include a casino, a shopping promenade, and several hotels with a total of 5,300 rooms. Two of the hotels, the Delano and the Mondrian, would be developed by Morgans Hotel Group at a total cost of $700 million, while Boyd Gaming would own the $2.9 billion, 3,300-room Echelon Resort.

It was also announced that Boyd Gaming executive Bob Boughner would leave his position at the Borgata to lead development of Echelon Place, under the position of president and chief executive officer of Echelon Resorts. Boughner had previously overseen construction and development of the Borgata, and had also overseen construction of the Stardust's 32-story tower, which was opened in 1991. Boughner and his executives spent much of 2005 developing a list of prospective partners for the project.

Project planners stated that the 63-acre site was large enough to contain construction without affecting nearby businesses and tourists, and also said that because of the site's easy access and proximity to Industrial Road and Interstate 15, the resort would not cause traffic delays after opening. However, it was later estimated that the project, upon completion, would bring an additional 12,190 vehicles to the busy Las Vegas Strip area. Construction was initially scheduled to begin in early 2007, following the demolition of the Stardust, with an opening scheduled for early 2010. Boyd Gaming's stock dropped eight percent in the days following Echelon Place's announcement, due to skepticism about the project.

In October 2006, Boyd Gaming agreed to sell its Barbary Coast hotel-casino to Harrah's Entertainment in exchange for 24 acres (9.7 ha) of property located adjacent to the Stardust that was previously occupied by the Westward Ho Hotel and Casino. The deal gave Boyd Gaming a total of 87 contiguous acres, although the company said the additional land did not change its current plans for Echelon Place, while stating that the new property could allow for future expansion of the Echelon project. The sale was completed several months later, and two acres of the newly acquired property were to be used for roadways to alleviate traffic congestion, while the other 22 acres would remain available for future development, possibly as a residential component. In Echelon Place's design plans submitted to the County Commission, Boyd Gaming included the option of converting up to 1,000 rooms in the Delano and Mondrian hotels to condominiums, although the company had no intentions of adding condominiums to the project and only included them in the design plans as a potential option. Boyd Gaming executives were concerned about overbuilding of condominiums in Las Vegas and a possible lack of demand for them.

The Stardust was closed on November 1, 2006, and its 32-story tower was imploded on March 13, 2007. Because of Boyd Gaming's inexperience with retail, the company partnered with General Growth Properties (GGP) in May 2007. Under the deal, GGP would co-develop and manage the Echelon project's $500 million shopping mall, while financing $100 million of the cost.

=== Construction and cancellation ===
A groundbreaking ceremony for the project occurred on June 19, 2007, and was attended by approximately 200 people. By that point, the name had been shortened to "Echelon". The project's opening was expected for the third quarter of 2010. At the time of groundbreaking, the cost of the project had grown to $4.8 billion, with the two hotels by Morgans Hotel Group expected to cost a total of $950 million. The $800 million increase on the project's overall cost was partly due to increased costs on construction materials. Bill Boyd, the chairman of Boyd Gaming, said that the company "made the right decision" in delaying its Stardust redevelopment plans a decade earlier: "The time that we took allowed for our company to build a much greater foundation. We can see there is a demand for this type of project now and we believe the demand will be there when we're ready to open."

The Echelon project would include 10.5 million sq ft (980,000 m^{2}), and would take up nearly three-quarters of the 87-acre property. Boughner said about the project's multiple hotels, "Rather than create 5,000 rooms in one big box, it was much more important to create five different sensibilities. There are a variety of hotel sizes and experiences. The casino and the retail surround all the hotels giving a sense of connection." Boyd Gaming believed Echelon Place's primary competitors would be Project CityCenter, The Venetian, the Bellagio, and Wynn Las Vegas. Boughner said the resort would not have a theme: "Echelon, in terms of architecture, is more about designing a building that will evoke an emotion. A theme doesn't evoke an emotion, it evokes a cheap thrill."

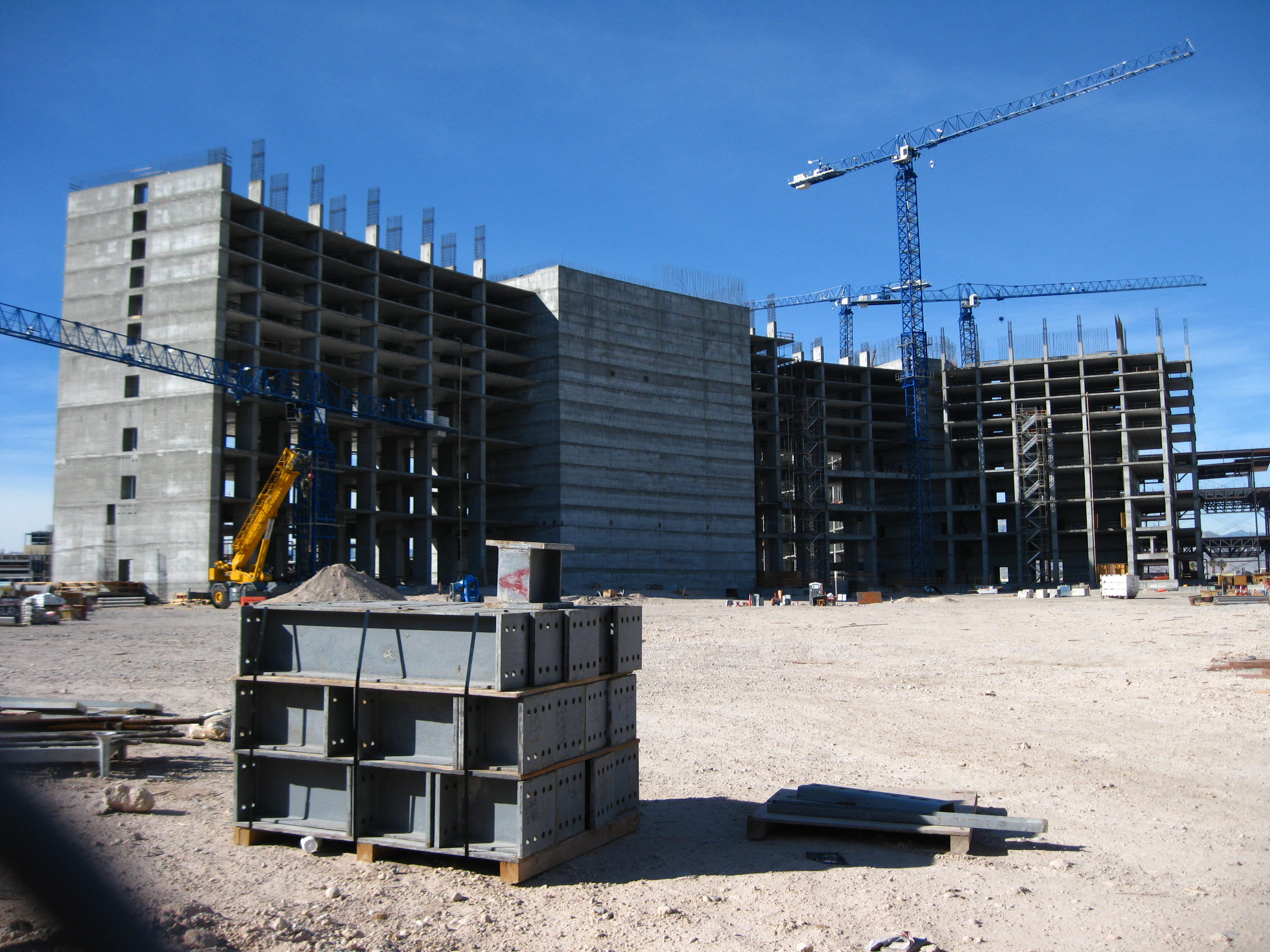
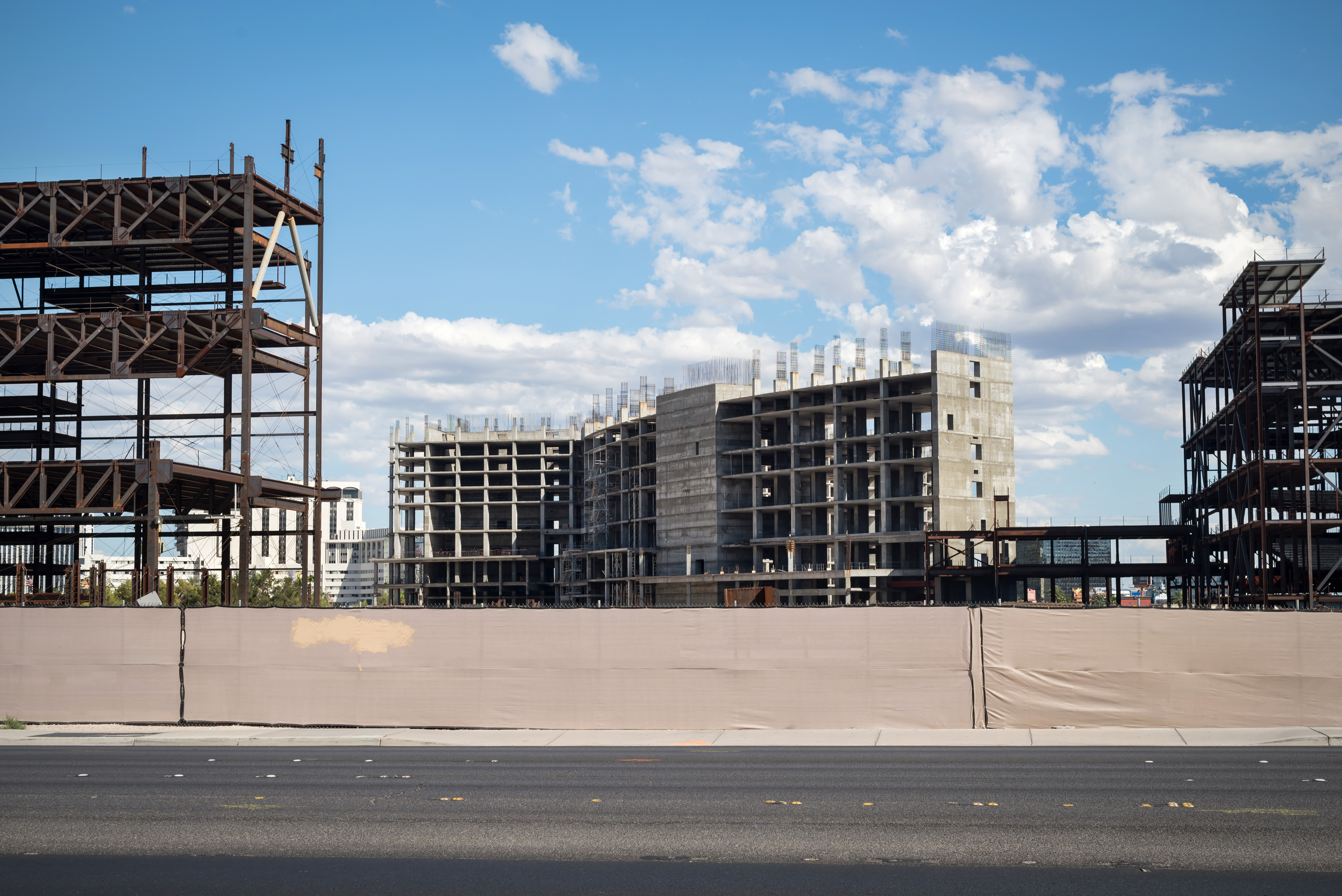
Unfinished hotel tower in 2010 (top) and 2015

The entire project was overseen by Tishman Construction, but different general contractors worked on each of the project's five hotels. Marnell Corrao Associates was the general contractor for the project's main hotel, Echelon Tower, also known as Hotel Echelon. The construction site consisted of approximately 800 workers, who were divided between two shifts, and worked six days a week. Three of the project's hotels – The Enclave, Hotel Echelon, and Shangri-La Las Vegas – would be housed in three attached towers, which began to take form in June 2008. That month, a carpenter working on Echelon Tower died after falling 15 feet and hitting his head. A union official denied that the project's construction workers were being rushed to meet deadlines, although the Nevada Occupational Safety and Health Administration later determined that the worker died as the result of safety violations and being rushed. Marnell Corrao Associates was fined $11,000 in the worker's death. Although the fine was disputed, it was eventually paid. Ultimately, there had been 44 injuries among Marnell's 280 workers at the Echelon site.

On August 1, 2008, Boyd Gaming announced that construction would be halted for three to four quarters due to economic conditions, as Morgans Hotel Group and GGP were unable to obtain financing to build their portions of the project because of the Great Recession. Boyd Gaming had spent $500 million on the project, and planned to finance $3.3 billion of the total budget. The company's stock rose 20 percent on the day of the postponement, which was praised by investors, who were concerned about the state of the economy and the company's ability to complete such a large project. At that time of the delay, the site consisted of three steel-framed hotel towers, each standing eight stories high. Some work was expected to continue in order to maintain the steel and concrete structures. The two hotels by Morgans Hotel Group, now expected to cost a total of $1 billion, had been scheduled to begin construction that summer. Local economists and housing analysts believed the project's postponement would delay a housing recovery in the Las Vegas Valley, as the project would employ 10,000 people upon its eventual opening.

In September 2008, Boyd Gaming revised its development agreement with Morgans Hotel Group, which would have through 2009 to obtain financing for its two hotels in the Echelon project. Boyd Gaming was also in discussions to revise its agreement with GGP, which had intended to remain involved in the project. However, GGP experienced financial difficulties and the agreement was dissolved in October 2008. Later that month, Boyd Gaming announced that it would evaluate alternative options for the Echelon project throughout 2009 and that construction would not resume during that year. Because the project was in the early phase of construction, it had the potential to be reconfigured and downsized. Other options included recruiting new joint venture partners and building the project in phases. Selling the property was not an option at the time. The company planned to spend approximately $150 million over the subsequent few quarters to complete some of the project's steel fabrication. At the end of 2008, the site of a 25-year-old McDonald's became part of the Echelon land following the opening of a new McDonald's on adjacent property, formerly occupied by the Westward Ho's casino.

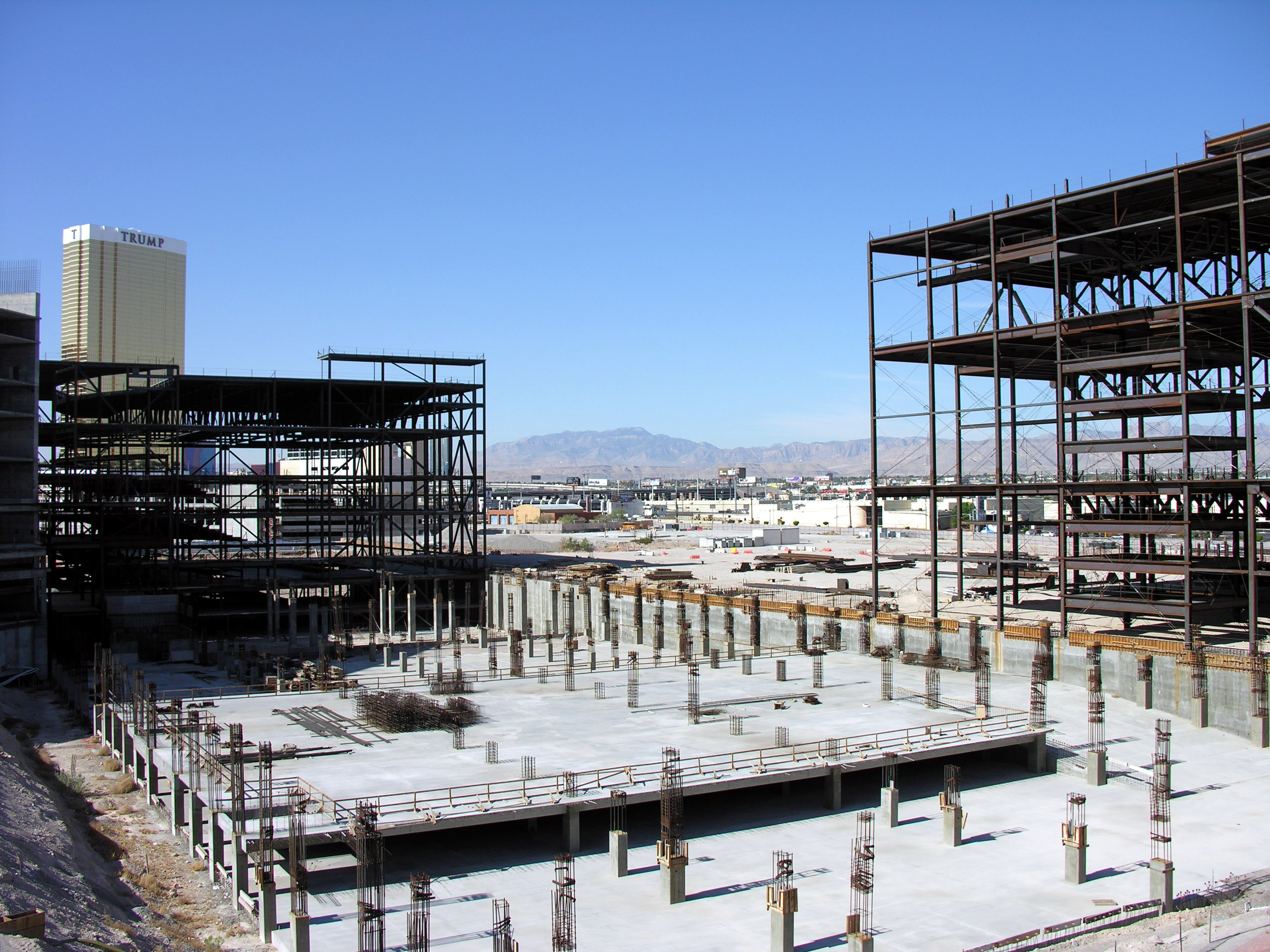
Exposed steel frames in 2012

In October 2009, amid falling profits, Boyd announced that the project would be suspended for at least three to five years. In July 2012, the Clark County Zoning Commission granted Boyd Gaming a six-year extension to complete the project, which was considered an eyesore. The company also worked with the commission to create a $4 million beautification plan for the construction site that was expected to be finished later that year. The plan would include landscaping the portion of the site that faced the Las Vegas Strip, and covering the complex's steel frames with material, while construction equipment had already been removed from the site. Boyd Gaming expected to resume construction within three to five years, with an opening as late as 2018. The company expected to spend $15.5 million to $17 million annually to maintain the site, for expenses such as security and property taxes.

In March 2013, Boyd sold the Echelon site for $350 million to the Genting Group, a Malaysia-based gaming company which began developing the site as the 3,500-room Resorts World Las Vegas. Some of the unfinished Echelon buildings were incorporated into the Resorts World project. Following several delays, Resorts World opened on June 24, 2021.

== Proposed facilities ==
- Echelon Resort would be owned and operated by Boyd Gaming, and would include two hotel towers:
  - Echelon Tower would be the main hotel tower. Also known as Echelon Hotel and Hotel Echelon. Originally known as the Echelon Resort Tower.
  - The Enclave would be an all-suite tower, attached to Echelon Tower. Originally known as the Echelon Suite Tower.
- Mondrian at Echelon: An 850-room hotel; a 50% joint venture with Morgans Hotel Group. Never began construction.
- Delano Hotel: A 550-room hotel; a 50% joint venture with Morgans Hotel Group. Never began construction.
- The Shangri-La Hotel Las Vegas: A hotel to be managed by Shangri-La Hotels and Resorts. It would include 353 rooms, originally announced as 400. Attached to Echelon Tower and The Enclave.
- Las Vegas ExpoCenter: Planned 750,000 sq ft (70,000 m^{2}) convention center and associated meeting space. Boyd Gaming began booking convention reservations in December 2007, years ahead of the project's planned opening in the third quarter of 2010.
- High Street: A 400,000 sq ft (37,000 m^{2}) indoor shopping center to be built at a cost of $500 million, and to be managed by General Growth Properties through a partnership with Boyd Gaming.
- Casino: Planned 140,000 sq ft (13,000 m^{2}) casino.
- Two theater venues, one with 4,000 seats and one with 1,500 seats, both to be managed by Anschutz Entertainment Group.
- Parking garage, with nearly 8,000 spaces.
