= Main Street Station (hotel and casino) =

Hotel casino in Las Vegas, Nevada

Coordinates: 36.174266°N 115.145441°W

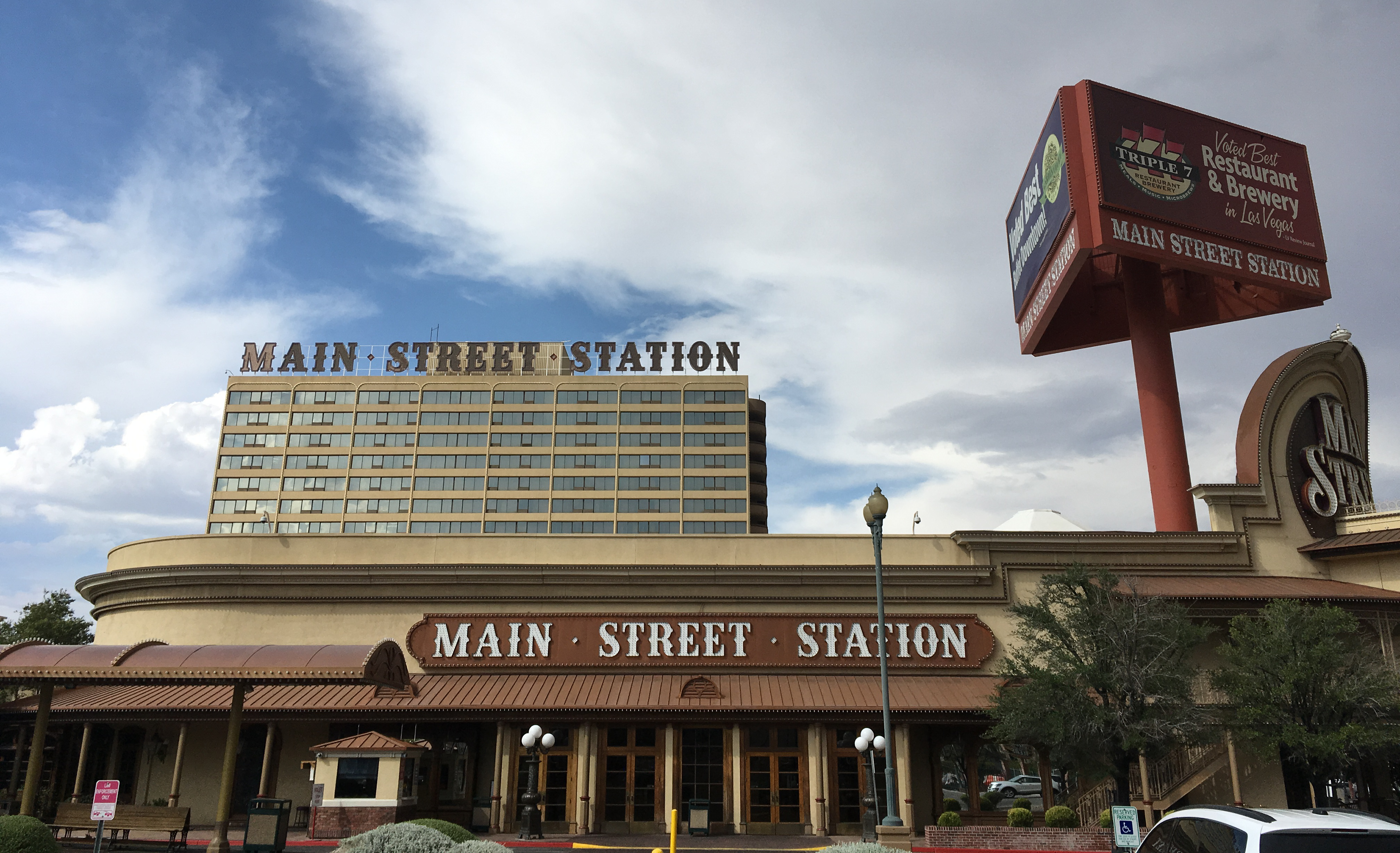
- Main Street Station in 2018
- Interactive map of Main Street Station
- Location: Las Vegas, NV; 200 North Main Street
- Opened: 1978; 48 years ago
- Theme: Victorian era
- No. of rooms: 406
- Gaming space: 26,918 sq ft (2,500.8 m^{2})
- Signature attractions: Triple 7 microbrewery
- Notable restaurants: Garden Court
- Casino type: Land-based
- Owner: Boyd Gaming
- Previous names: Holiday International (1978–1984); Park Hotel and Casino (1987–1990)
- Renovated in: 1987, 1990–91, 1996
- Website: mainstreetcasino.com

Main Street Station is a hotel and casino in downtown Las Vegas, Nevada. It is owned by Boyd Gaming. It originally opened in 1978 as the Holiday International, part of the Holiday Inn franchise. The casino portion closed in 1980, due to financial problems, and the hotel closed four years later. The property was renovated by Japanese investor Katsuki Manabe as the Park Hotel and Casino, which operated from 1987 to 1990.

Florida developer Bob Snow purchased the property and renovated it further, reopening it as Main Street Station on August 30, 1991. It featured a Victorian theme and various antiques, which came from Snow's personal collection. Snow did not have experience in the gaming industry, and Main Street Station filed for bankruptcy four months after its opening. It closed in June 1992, and was sold to Boyd the following year. The company sometimes used the hotel to house overflow guests from its other downtown properties.

Main Street Station was fully reopened on November 22, 1996, after a $45 million renovation, which included the addition of a microbrewery known as Triple 7. The property's Victorian theme was retained. Main Street Station has 406 rooms and a 26,918 sq ft (2,500.8 m^{2}) casino. The antique collection includes railroad cars and a portion of the Berlin Wall.

== History ==
=== Early years ===
The property began as the Holiday International, with construction starting in 1976. The hotel opened in February 1978, with 416 rooms. The 16-story hotel was part of the Holiday Inn franchise, joining two other area locations, both on the Las Vegas Strip. The property's casino was opened on June 30, 1978, and was operated by Major Riddle, who leased it from Holiday International owner Louis Walter.

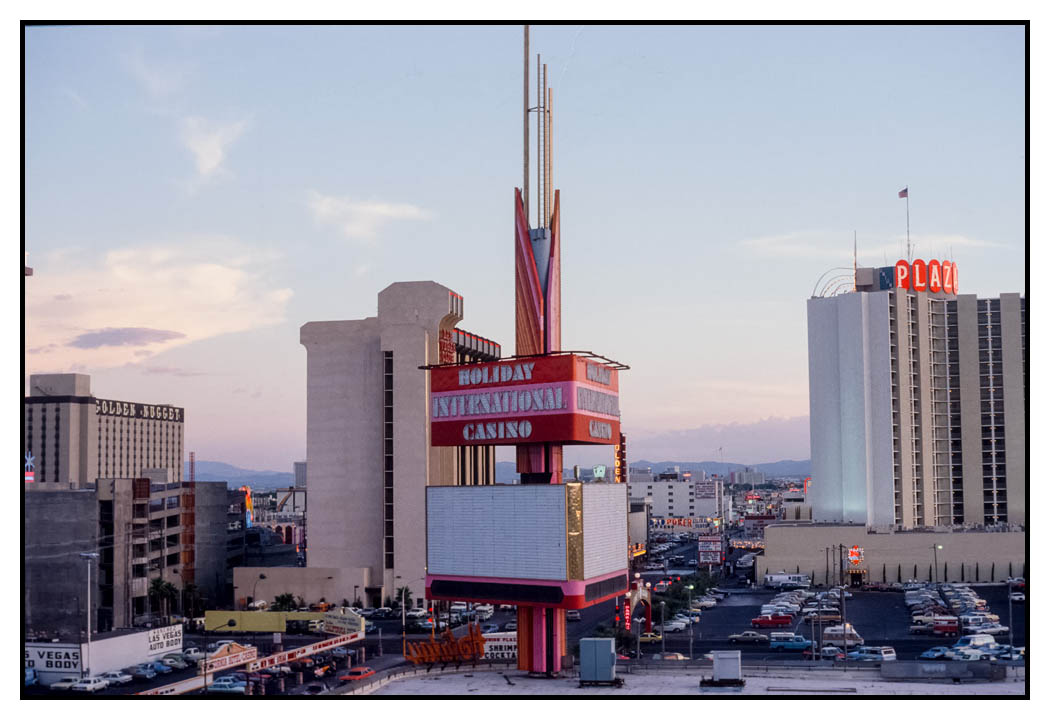
Sign for the Holiday International, early 1980s

The casino closed in September 1980, after going into bankruptcy. Kenilworth Systems Corporation, based in New York, planned to reopen the casino in 1982 as a testing ground for its cashless, computerized gambling system. However, Kenilworth soon encountered financial difficulties, and canceled its plans at the end of the year. The hotel closed in 1984, following an extended worker strike which affected numerous Las Vegas resorts.

The property reopened on September 3, 1987, as the Park Hotel and Casino. It was developed by Japanese investor Katsuki Manabe, who spent approximately $13 million on refurbishments. Walter remained as owner, leasing the hotel-casino to Manabe. The property included 435 rooms, and 600 employees.

=== Main Street Station ===
In 1986, Florida developer Bob Snow announced a gambling, entertainment and retail complex in Las Vegas, to be known as Winchester Station. It would be based on his Church Street Station complex in Orlando.

In 1989, he sought to purchase the Park Hotel and use the site for Winchester Station, later renamed Church Street Station, and then Main Street Station in reference to its address. Snow's plans were partially funded by the Las Vegas Redevelopment Agency. The city also used eminent domain to acquire nearby land, which was to be used for a second parking garage that was later canceled.

Other downtown casinos filed a lawsuit to block Snow's project, and he filed a suit against them, accusing his future competitors of violating antitrust laws. Snow's purchase of the Park Hotel was completed in February 1990. He closed it seven months later, allowing for new construction on the interior and exterior. A collector of antiques, Snow renovated the property to feature a Victorian theme with various pieces from his collection; additional items were to be displayed in a future expansion.

Main Street Station opened on August 30, 1991. Snow lacked experience in the gaming industry, and the property suffered financial problems from the start, filing for Chapter 11 bankruptcy four months after its opening. The hotel-casino owed $40 million in debt. As a result, operations were scaled back on June 9, 1992, and the property fully closed six days later. Various items from Snow's collection were auctioned to help reduce the debt.

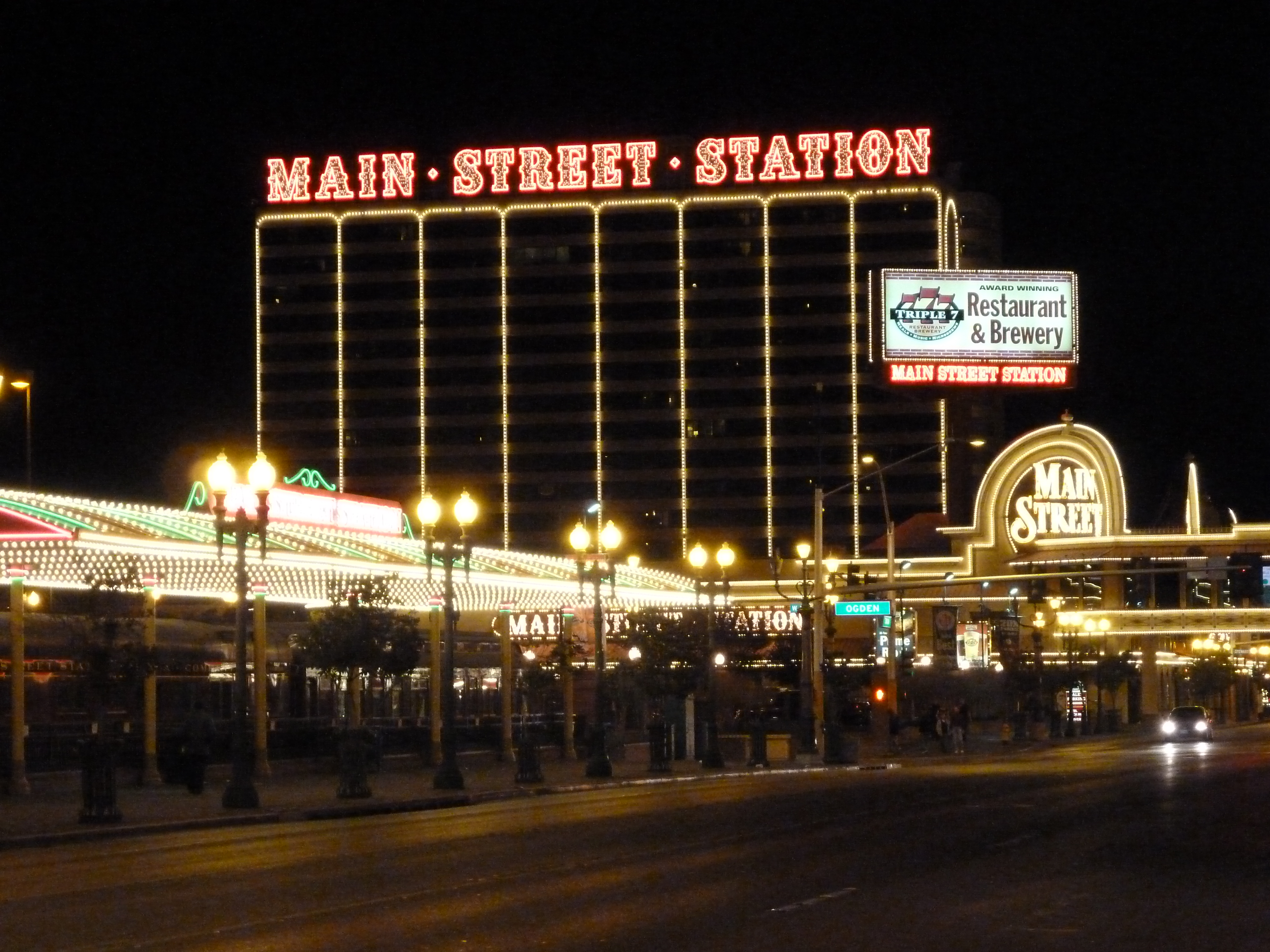
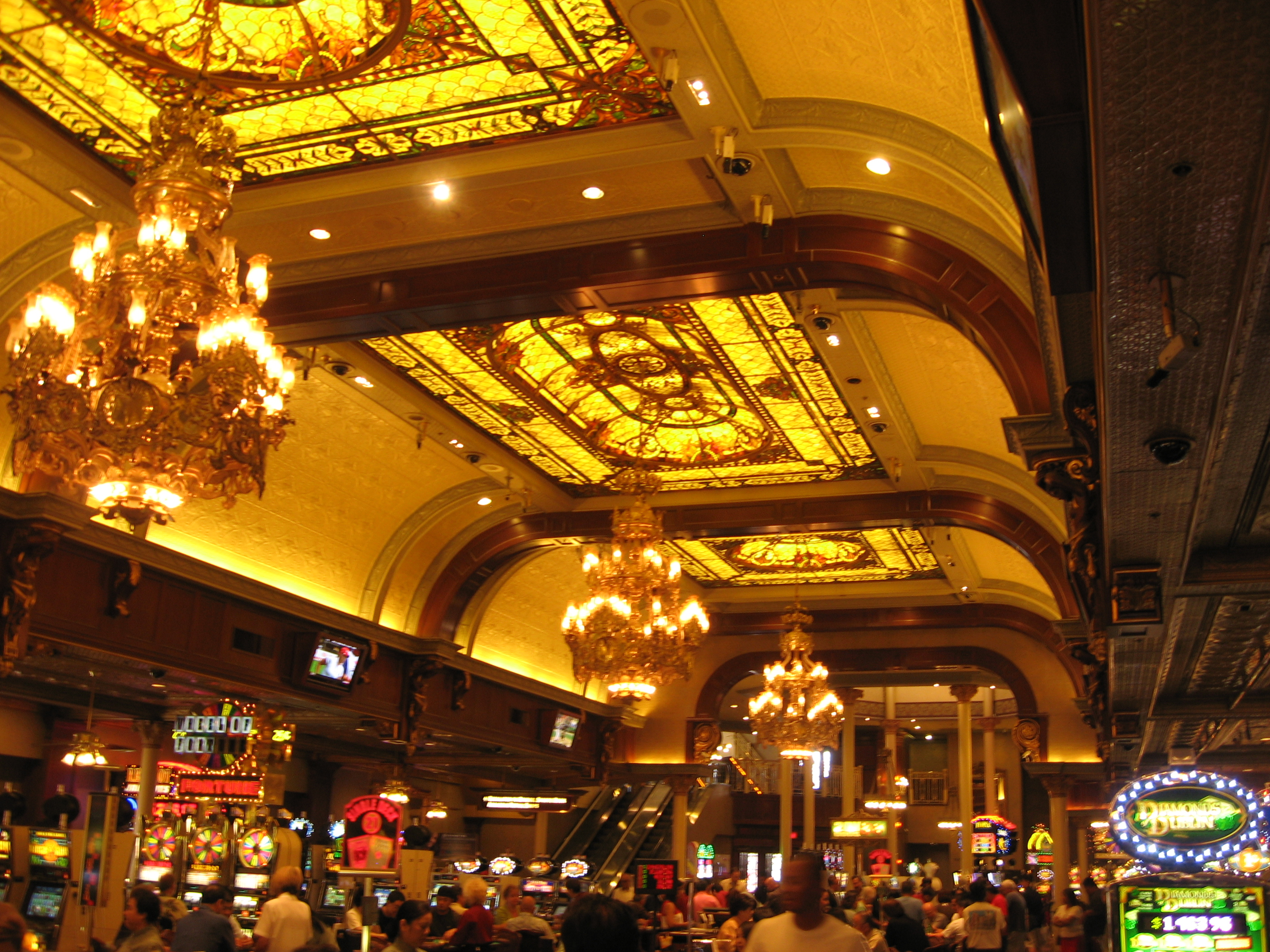
Main Street Station exterior and casino floor around 2010

Snow hoped to find a buyer or investor before the property went into receivership. Entertainer Debbie Reynolds considered partnering with Snow, but this did not pan out. Bank of America foreclosed on the hotel-casino in September 1992. Snow, nevertheless, continued to seek out investors to reopen Main Street Station and then expand it with the planned retail and entertainment component, which ultimately went unbuilt. Several prospective buyers emerged in 1993, and Boyd Gaming bought the property at the end of the year for $16.5 million. The company sometimes used the hotel to house overflow guests from its nearby California and Fremont properties. During Main Street Station's semi-closure, the south parking lot was used for a car explosion scene in the 1995 film Casino. Main Street Station was also used as the production headquarters and as a filming location for the 1995 television series The Watcher.

At the end of 1995, Boyd announced that it would fully reopen Main Street Station the following year. The company launched a $45 million renovation of the property, while maintaining the Victorian theme. Boyd made numerous improvements, such as increasing the number of parking spaces, renovating rooms, and enhancing the back-of-house facilities. Chandeliers were kept on the casino floor, but additional lighting was added to brighten it. The property also had the benefit of a new downtown attraction, the nearby Fremont Street Experience.

Main Street Station reopened on November 22, 1996. It was marketed as a locals casino and became popular among area residents. Like the California and Fremont, it is also popular among Hawai‘i tourists. The California and Main Street Station are connected by an enclosed walkway over Main Street.

Nevada casinos were ordered to close in March 2020, due to the COVID-19 pandemic in the state. Although most casinos reopened within a few months, Main Street Station remained closed for more than a year. It reopened on September 8, 2021.

== Features ==
Main Street Station has 406 hotel rooms, and a 26,918 sq ft (2,500.8 m^{2}) casino.

Upon its opening in 1991, a section of Main Street Station was branded Rosie O'Grady's Goodtime Emporium. It included two 100-foot bars, a billiard parlor, a pub, and restaurants. Main Street Station featured several new restaurants upon its reopening in 1996, including the Garden Court buffet, which is styled in the property's Victorian theme. Triple 7, a restaurant and microbrewery, is popular for its fruit-flavored brews. The black cherry stout won a silver medal at the 1997 Great American Beer Festival, and won bronze two years later. The brewery won gold at the 2024 U.S. Open Beer Championship for its Belgium witbier.

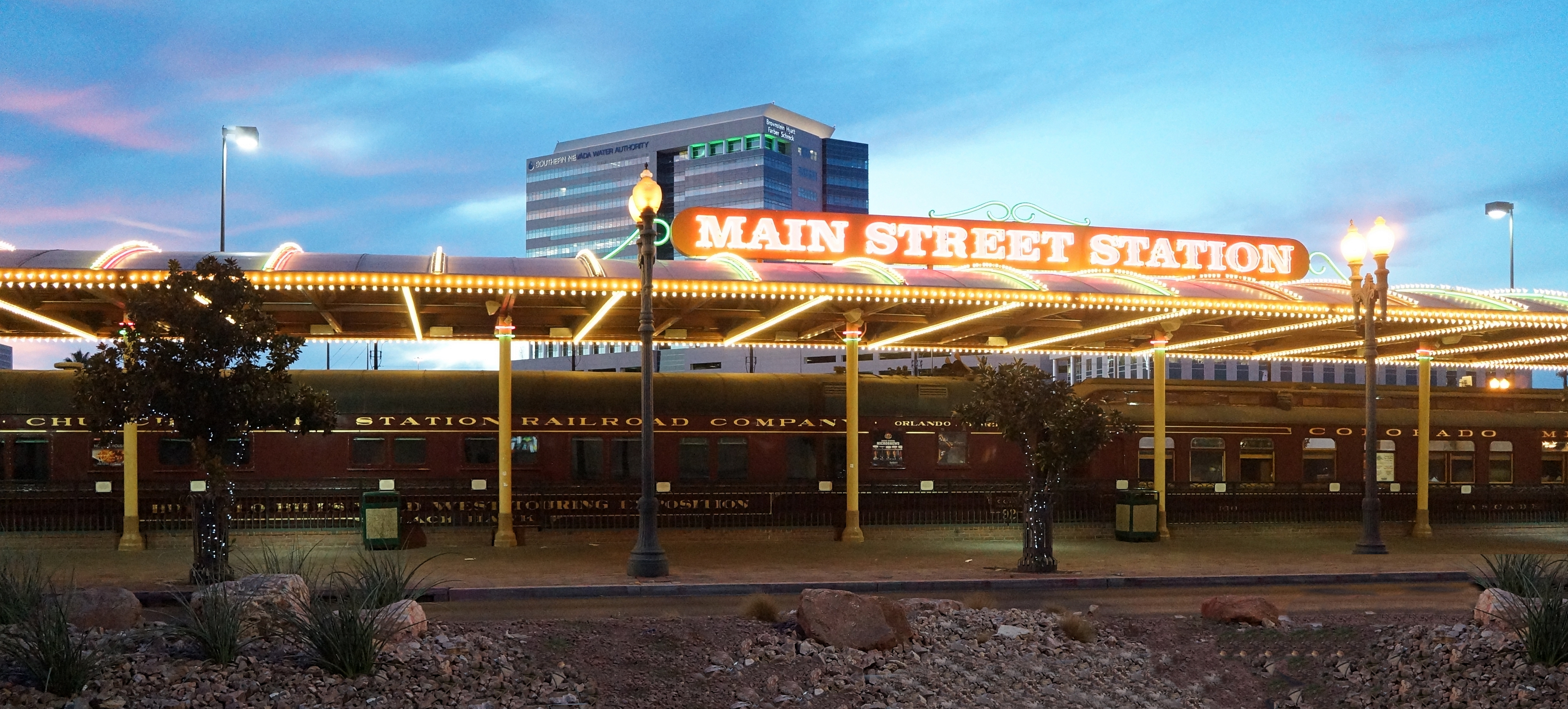
Railroad cars displayed outside of the hotel-casino in 2016, shortly before their removal

Main Street Station has various antiquities on display. The property allows self-guided tours of the collection, which began during Snow's ownership. The collection includes a three-ton piece of the Berlin Wall. It was purchased by Snow in 1990, and installed at Main Street Station for its 1996 reopening. It is located in the men's restroom and has urinals affixed to it.

Other items include stained glass from Lillian Russell's mansion in Pennsylvania, doors and the facade from the Kuwait Royal Bank, doors from the George Pullman Mansion, chandeliers from a Coca-Cola building in Austin, Texas and Figaro Opera House in Paris, and various statues.

Since its 1991 opening, Main Street Station has also featured several railroad cars. A pullman car, named after Louisa May Alcott, was incorporated into the interior of Lili Marlene's, a restaurant and pub. The Louisa Alcott car served as its own restaurant-within-a-restaurant. The car has since been featured inside the Pullman Grille, which opened in 1996. By 2016, the Pullman Grille had been closed for years as a fulltime restaurant, instead operating only during private events.

Two other railroad cars, purportedly used by Buffalo Bill and others, were on display outside of the hotel-casino until 2017, when they and the land beneath them were sold. The site was redeveloped as the parking garage for the Circa Resort & Casino. One other railroad car remains on display outside the casino's north entrance.
