= Boyd Gaming =

American casino gaming and hospitality company

Boyd Gaming Corp.
- Type: Public
- Traded as: NYSE: BYD; S&P 400 Component
- Industry: Gambling, hotels, entertainment
- Founded: January 1, 1975; 51 years ago
- Founder: Sam and Bill Boyd
- Headquarters: Las Vegas, Nevada, United States
- Products: Casinos, hotels
- Revenue: $3.4 billion (2021)
- Operating income: $900 million (2021)
- Net income: $464 million (2021)
- Total assets: $6.2 billion (2021)
- Total equity: $1.5 billion (2021)
- Number of employees: 15,114 (2021)
- Website: boydgaming.com

Boyd Gaming Corporation is an American gambling and hospitality company based in Paradise, Nevada, US. It was founded in 1975 by father and son Sam and Bill Boyd.

As of 2021, Boyd operated 28 properties with a total of 10,751 hotel rooms and 1,694,482 square feet (157,422.5 m^{2}) of casino space with 31,635 slot machines and 686 table games, in 10 U.S. states. Gambling revenue is 80% of total gross revenue.

== History ==
=== Early years ===
Boyd Gaming's history dates to 1941, when founder Sam Boyd first arrived in Las Vegas with his family. After being hired as a dealer, Sam Boyd worked his way up through the ranks of the Las Vegas casino industry, first to pit boss, then shift boss. He eventually saved enough to buy a small interest in the Sahara Hotel and Casino; later, Sam Boyd left the Sahara to become general manager and partner of The Mint Las Vegas.

Sam Boyd first partnered with his son Bill in 1962, when the two teamed up to acquire the Eldorado Casino in Henderson, Nevada. Bill, who was then a practicing attorney, acquired his first stake in the Eldorado by doing its legal work. Sam would go on to manage the Eldorado full-time after the Mint was sold in 1968.

=== Boyd Gaming formation ===
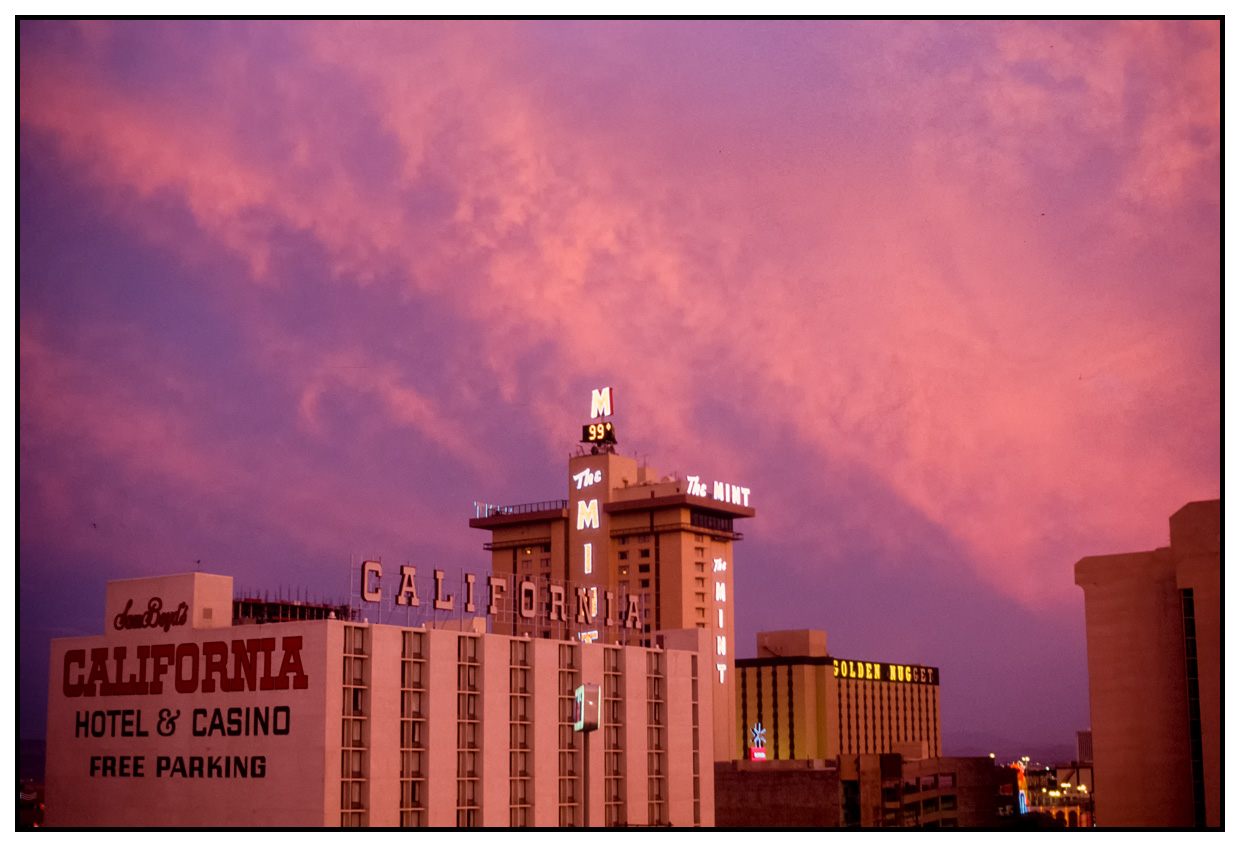
California Hotel and Casino (foreground) in the early 1980s

Although the Boyd family had been involved in the Las Vegas casino industry for decades, Boyd Gaming Corporation wasn't founded until January 1, 1975, when the company was formed to develop and operate the California Hotel and Casino in downtown Las Vegas. Then known as the Boyd Group, the company initially had 75 investors.

Boyd Gaming embarked on its first expansion in 1979, when it opened the first Sam's Town Hotel and Gambling Hall-branded property; Sam's Town Las Vegas on Boulder Highway at Nellis Boulevard. Considered one of the first "locals" properties in the Las Vegas Valley, Sam's Town helped inaugurate the later development of the Las Vegas "Boulder Strip."

During these first two decades in operation, Sam and Bill Boyd developed a reputation for running a squeaky-clean operation. As a result, Nevada regulators turned to the Boyds for help following an investigation of skimming operations at the Stardust and Fremont casinos in the mid-1980s. The properties were notorious at the time for their extensive skimming operations; according to the FBI, anywhere from $7 million to $15 million in funds from the Stardust were diverted to organized crime figures between 1974 and 1976 alone.

In 1984, after leveling a $3 million ($9.3 million in 2025) fine against the Stardust for skimming, the Nevada Gaming Commission asked the Boyds to run the property's gaming operations. When the Stardust was taken over by the reputable Boyd family, they were surprised by its huge profits, now that every penny of income was being recorded. Ex-FBI agent William F. Roemer Jr., longtime senior agent of the FBI's organized-crime squad in Chicago and an expert in Las Vegas doings, said, "The amount of skim had been so heavy that the profit and loss statement did not present a true picture of the gold mine that the Stardust was." After several years of successful operations, Boyd Gaming officially acquired the Stardust and Fremont in 1985.

=== Public stock offering ===
Sam Boyd died on January 15, 1993, at the age of 82, and was succeeded as chief executive officer by Bill Boyd. In July of the same year, Boyd Gaming held its initial public offering of stock, debuting on the New York Stock Exchange under ticker symbol "BYD."

Funds from the IPO supplied Boyd Gaming with a source of capital for expansion, and the company embarked on a period of aggressive growth. The company acquired the Eldorado and Jokers Wild (which had previously been owned directly by the Boyd family) in 1993; later that year, Boyd Gaming acquired the bankrupt Main Street Station Hotel and Casino and Brewery.

=== Expansion beyond Nevada ===
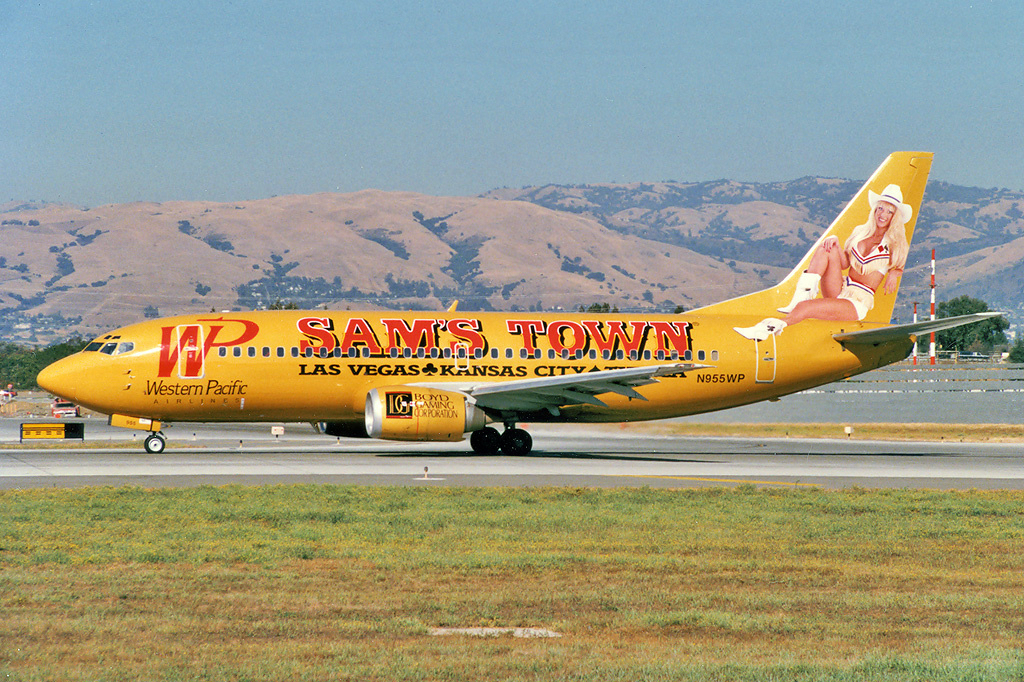
A Western Pacific Airlines jet in the Sam's Town color scheme, c. 1997

The company's first expansion outside of Nevada came in 1994, when Boyd Gaming opened Sam's Town Tunica in Mississippi. Later expansions included:

- Silver Star Hotel and Casino, owned by the Mississippi Band of Choctaw Indians (opened in 1994; management contract expired in 2000);
- Treasure Chest Casino in Kenner, Louisiana (Boyd owned 15% of the property at its 1994 opening, before acquiring Treasure Chest outright in 1997);
- Sam's Town Kansas City (opened 1995, closed 1998);
- Par-A-Dice Hotel and Casino in East Peoria, Illinois. (acquired in 1996);
- Blue Chip Casino, Hotel and Spa in Michigan City, Indiana. (acquired in 1999);
- Delta Downs Racetrack Casino & Hotel, Vinton, Louisiana (acquired in 2001);
- Sam's Town Shreveport (formerly Harrah's Shreveport; acquired from Harrah's Entertainment in 2004).

Boyd Gaming's most ambitious expansion project came in 2003, when the company opened the $1.1 billion Borgata hotel and casino in Atlantic City, New Jersey. A joint venture with MGM Resorts International, Borgata was the first new casino property to open in Atlantic City in 13 years, and quickly emerged as the market's leading property by gaming revenue. Borgata became Boyd Gaming's largest property, supplying more than one-third of the company's overall profits, until MGM purchased Boyd Gaming's interest in the property May 2016.

=== Coast Casinos and South Coast ===
Less than a year after Borgata opened, Boyd announced plans to acquire Coast Casinos, one of the largest operators of locals casinos in the Las Vegas market. Completed on July 1, 2004, the $1.3 billion acquisition gave Boyd Gaming four additional Las Vegas properties—Suncoast; Gold Coast; The Orleans; and Barbary Coast.

The Coast acquisition also included the yet-to-be completed South Coast Casino, located five miles (8.0 km) south of The Strip on Las Vegas Boulevard. Boyd completed the project and opened its doors on December 22, 2005. Boyd Gaming operated the property for less than a year before selling it to former Coast Casinos CEO Michael Gaughan in 2006. The property was rebranded as South Point by Gaughan.

=== Echelon ===
In 2006, Boyd turned its focus to what would have been the largest project in its history: Echelon, a $4.8 billion resort complex at the site of the Stardust. In preparation for the project, Boyd swapped the Barbary Coast to Harrah's Entertainment in exchange for 24 acres near the Stardust, giving the company an 87-acre parcel on the north end of the Strip. The famed Stardust was closed on November 1, 2006, and imploded the night of March 13, 2007.

Construction on Echelon Place began on June 19, 2007, with plans to open in 2010, but was suspended a little over one year later, on August 1, 2008. At the time, Boyd officials cited "the difficult environment in today's capital markets, as well as weak economic conditions," and estimated construction would resume in three to four quarters. As the global recession deepened, the suspension continued; in October 2009, the company said it would likely be three to five years before development resumed. However, in March 2013, Boyd sold the Echelon site for $350 million to the Genting Group, a Malaysia-based gaming company to develop the site as Resorts World Las Vegas.

=== 2007–2019 ===
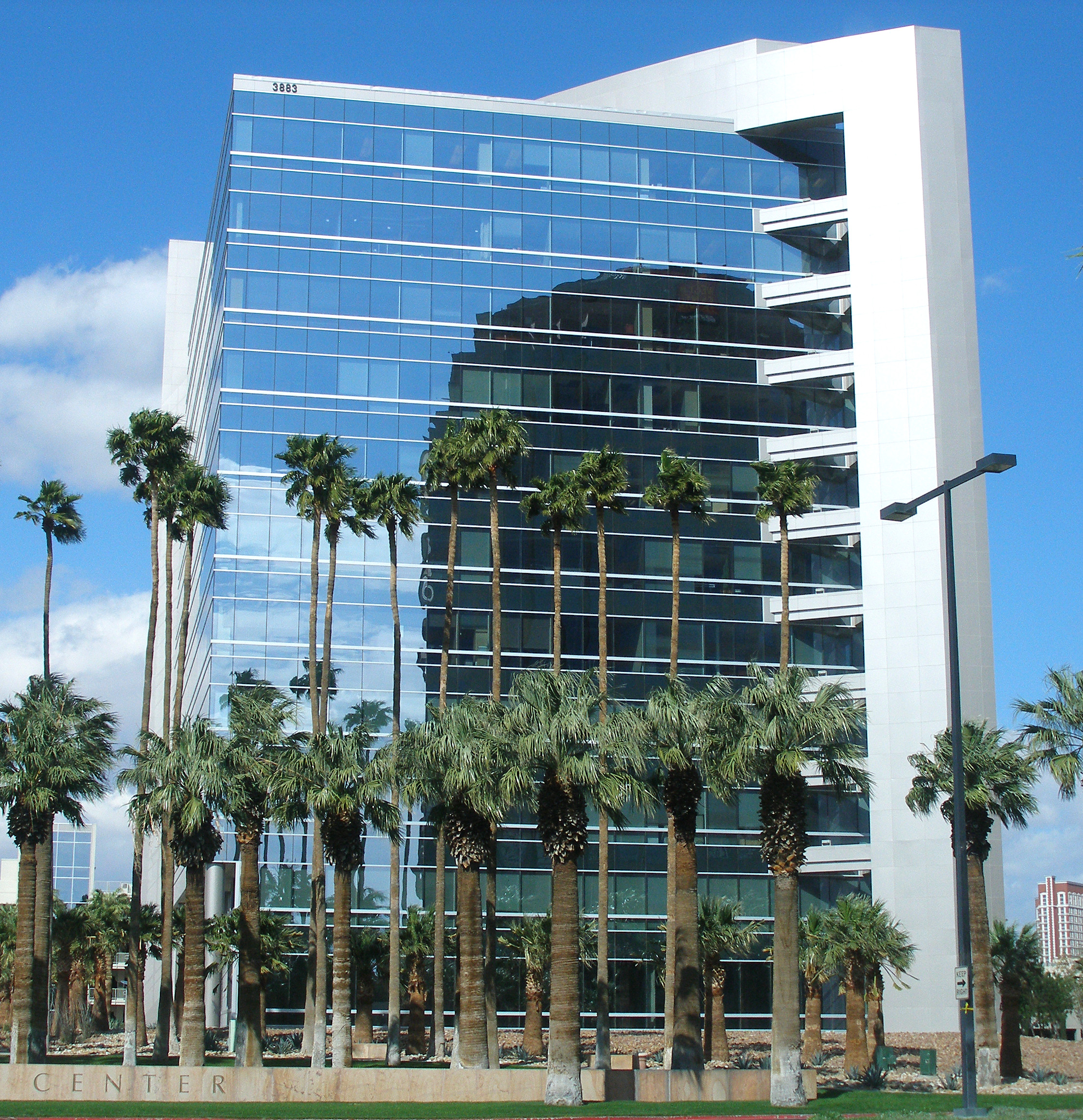
Boyd Gaming's Executive headquarters at Howard Hughes Center

In 2007, Boyd purchased Dania Jai Alai, a fronton in Dania Beach, Florida. The company hoped to expand the facility with a casino, but efforts to allow new casinos in the Miami area made little headway. Boyd agreed in 2011 to sell the property to Dania Entertainment for $80 million, but the deal was not completed. The two companies reached a new sale agreement in February 2013 for $65.5 million.

Boyd bought the IP Casino Resort & Spa in October 2011 for $278 million cash, plus a $10 million donation to the Engelstad Family Foundation.

In November 2012, Boyd acquired Peninsula Gaming, an Iowa-based company and subsidiary of Peninsula Pacific Entertainment with five casinos in the Midwest and South, for $1.45 billion.

The company made two deals in 2016 to expand its footprint in the Vegas locals market, acquiring the Aliante Casino and Hotel for $380 million and the two properties of Cannery Casino Resorts for $230 million. Meanwhile, it sold its 50 percent stake in the Borgata to MGM for $900 million.

In July 2018, Boyd announced a partnership with MGM Resorts International "to significantly increase each company's market access and customer base throughout the United States." The partnership is focused on positioning both companies to succeed in the emerging online gambling and sports betting markets in the United States.

In late 2018, Boyd completed two deals to increase its regional holdings. It acquired Valley Forge Casino Resort in Pennsylvania for $281 million. It also purchased the operations of four casinos from Pinnacle Entertainment for $564 million: Ameristar Kansas City, Ameristar St. Charles, Belterra Casino, and Belterra Park. The company paid another $58 million for the real estate of Belterra Park. The sale was designed to ensure regulatory approval for Penn National Gaming's planned purchase of Pinnacle.

=== 2020–present ===
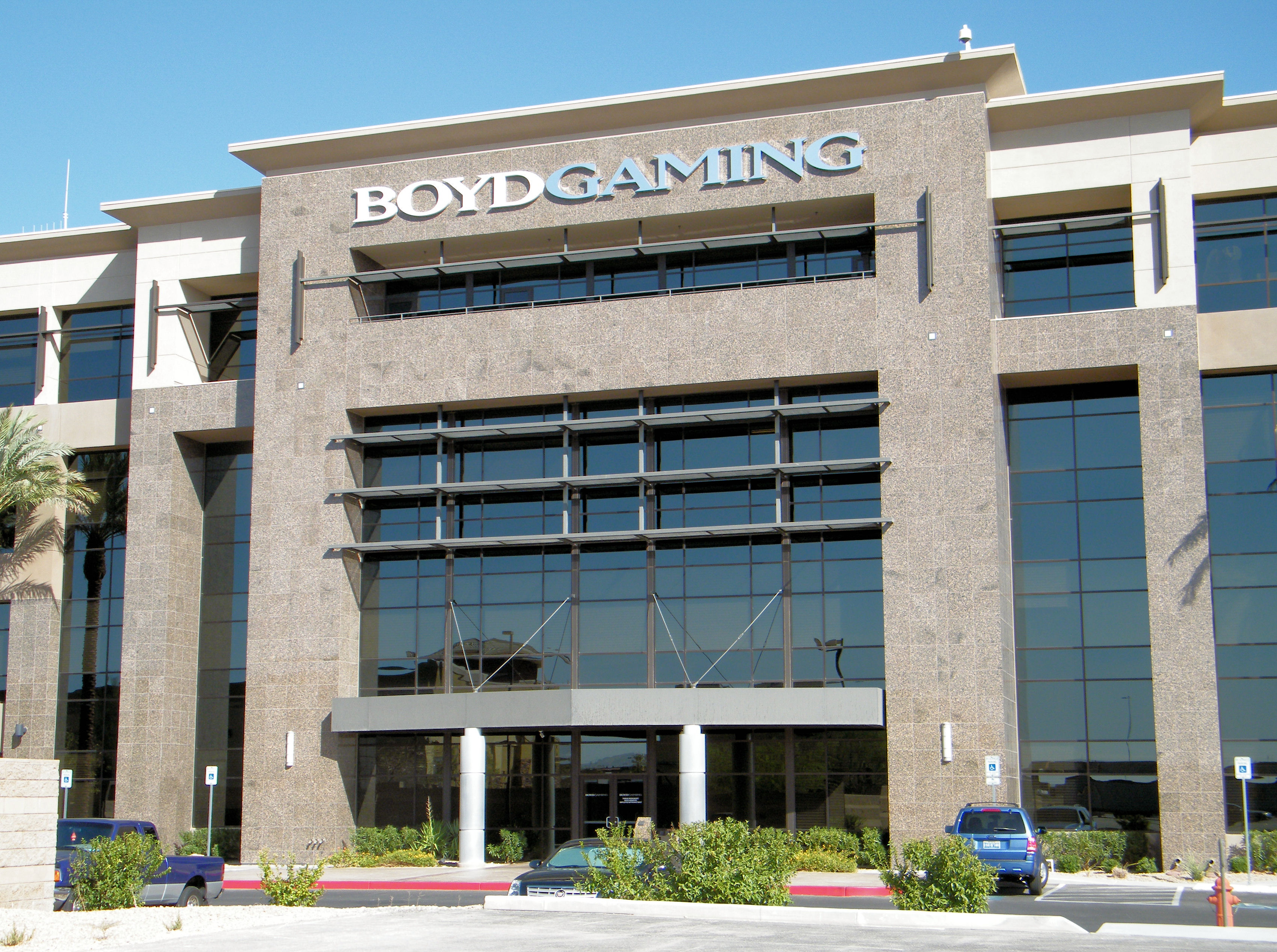
Boyd Gaming's current headquarters in unincorporated Spring Valley, a Las Vegas suburb

In July 2020, Boyd announced it was laying off at least 25% of its workforce equating to thousands of job losses at its properties nationwide due to the COVID-19 pandemic in the United States.

In March 2022, Boyd entered into a definitive agreement to acquire Pala Interactive LLC and its subsidiaries for total cash consideration of $170 million. In November 2022, it was announced the deal had been completed. Pala Interactive LLC is an interactive online gaming company, majority owned by the Pala Band of Mission Indians.

Between September 5 and 7, 2025, the company was struck by a cyberattack, in which the hackers succeeded in removing employee personal identifying information; five lawsuits were filed within a week, including a class-action.

Boyd's newest casino, Cadence Crossing, in east Henderson opened in March 2026, replacing its Jokers Wild Casino.

== List of properties ==
=== Downtown Las Vegas casinos ===
- California Hotel and Casino
- Fremont Hotel and Casino
- Main Street Station

=== Other Las Vegas area casinos ===
- Aliante Casino and Hotel
- Cannery Casino and Hotel
- Eastside Cannery Casino and Hotel
- Gold Coast
- Cadence Crossing (formerly Jokers Wild Casino)
- Orleans Hotel and Casino and Orleans Arena
- Sam's Town Hotel and Gambling Hall, Las Vegas
- Suncoast Hotel and Casino

=== Casinos in other states ===
- Amelia Belle Casino — Amelia, Louisiana
- Ameristar Casino Kansas City — Kansas City, Missouri
- Ameristar Casino Resort Spa St. Charles — St. Charles, Missouri
- Belterra Casino Resort & Spa — Florence, Indiana
- Blue Chip Casino, Hotel and Spa — Michigan City, Indiana
- Diamond Jo Dubuque — Dubuque, Iowa
- Diamond Jo Worth — Worth County, Iowa
- IP Casino Resort Spa — Biloxi, Mississippi
- Kansas Star Casino — Mulvane, Kansas
- Par-A-Dice Hotel and Casino — East Peoria, Illinois
- Sam's Town Hotel and Gambling Hall, Shreveport — Shreveport, Louisiana
- Treasure Chest Casino — Kenner, Louisiana
- Valley Forge Casino Resort — King of Prussia, Pennsylvania

=== Racinos ===
Boyd Gaming operates several racinos—a combined horse racing track and casino.

- Belterra Park Gaming & Entertainment Center — Anderson Township, Hamilton County, Ohio
- Delta Downs — Vinton, Louisiana
- Evangeline Downs — Opelousas, Louisiana

=== Non-casino properties ===
- Lattner Entertainment Group Illinois – Slot route operator
- Vacations Hawaii — Honolulu, with charter flights to Las Vegas operated by Omni Air International

== Former properties ==
- Barbary Coast Hotel and Casino (2004–2007) on the Las Vegas Strip, now The Vanderpump Hotel Las Vegas
- Borgata (partial ownership, 2003–2016) in Atlantic City, New Jersey, now owned by MGM Resorts International
- Dania Jai-Alai (2006–2013) in Dania Beach, Florida, now The Casino @ Dania Beach
- Eldorado Casino (1993–2020) in Henderson, Nevada, now The Pass Casino
- South Coast Casino (2005–2006) in Enterprise, Nevada, now South Point Hotel, Casino & Spa
- Silver Star Hotel and Casino (detail missing) in Neshoba County, Mississippi, now part of Pearl River Resort
- Sam's Town Gambling Hall, Kansas City (1995–1998) in Missouri, closed
- Sam's Town Hotel and Gambling Hall, Tunica (1994–2025) in Mississippi, closed
- Stardust Resort and Casino (1985–2006) on the Las Vegas Strip, razed in March 2007, now the site of Resorts World Las Vegas

== Sources ==
- 2009 Annual Report for statistical data via SEC.gov
