= Blue Chip Casino, Hotel and Spa =

Riverboat casino in Michigan City, Indiana

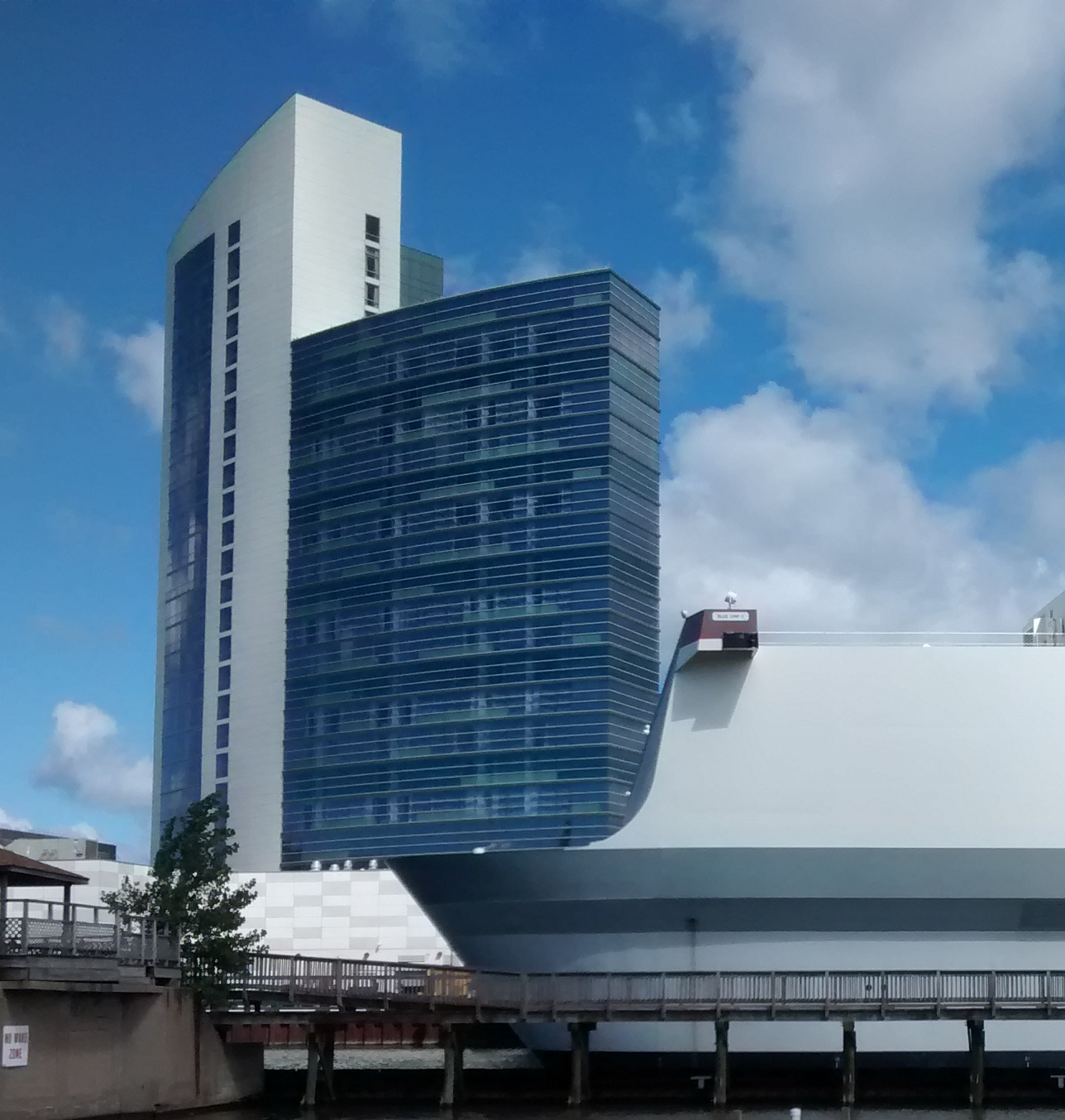
- Interactive map of Blue Chip Casino, Hotel and Spa
- Location: Michigan City, Indiana, United States; 777 Blue Chip Drive, Michigan City, Indiana 46360; 41.719968°N 86.893255°W
- No. of rooms: 486
- Gaming space: 65,000 sq ft (6,000 m^{2})
- Notable restaurants: William B's Steakhouse; The Game (temporarily closed); Lakeside Kitchen; Infusion
- Casino type: Riverboat/Land
- Owner: Boyd Gaming
- Renovated in: 2006, 2009
- Website: www.bluechipcasino.com

Blue Chip Casino, Hotel and Spa is a riverboat casino located in Michigan City, Indiana. It is owned by Boyd Gaming.

== History ==
Blue Chip was launched as a three-deck gaming boat on August 22, 1997, at that time only riverboat casinos were permitted in the state of Indiana, three years later, a hotel complex was added. In 2002, the third level was expanded, bringing the gaming space to 42,500 sq ft (3,950 m^{2}).

In 2005, the casino announced a $163 million renovation, and completed by the following year, replacing the three-level boat with a single-level casino that included a 65,000 sq ft of gaming space. In 2009, a further development was completed, adding 302 hotel rooms. This makes it the tallest building in Michigan City, as well as in LaPorte County and Northwest Indiana outside of South Bend.

The Casino has 65,000 sq ft (6,000 m^{2}) of gaming space that includes 22 table games, and more than 1,900 slot machines. It has 486 hotel rooms, 184 located in the 8-story Blue Chip tower, and 302 in the 22-story Spa Blue tower (numbered to 23 as there is no 13th floor), and four restaurants. The Spa Blue towers's second level (labeled as S in the elevators) contains the 10,000-square-foot Spa Blu.
