= William S. Boyd School of Law =

University of Nevada, Las Vegas law school

Coordinates: 36.10793°N 115.13980°W

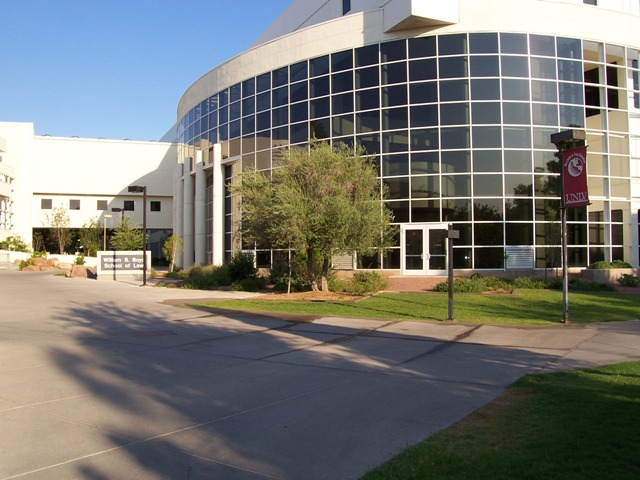
- Parent school: University of Nevada, Las Vegas
- Established: 1998; 28 years ago
- School type: Public
- Dean: Leah Chan Grinvald
- Location: Las Vegas, Nevada, USA
- Enrollment: 442
- Faculty: 51 (full-time)
- USNWR ranking: 79th (tie) (2025)
- Bar pass rate: 72.54% (first time 2022)
- Website: law.unlv.edu

The William S. Boyd School of Law is the law school of the University of Nevada, Las Vegas (UNLV) and the only law school in Nevada. It is named after Bill Boyd, a Nevada attorney and co-founder of Boyd Gaming Corporation who provided the initial funding for the school. The school opened in 1998 and graduated its first class in 2001.

The school has held American Bar Association accreditation since 2003 and joined the Association of American Law Schools in 2004.

In 2023, U.S. News & World Report ranked the law school's full-time program at No. 67 among 196 ranked full-time U.S. law schools and its part-time program at No. 20 among 70 ranked part-time U.S. law schools. Although it has gone down in ranking and now sits at 79th for its full-time program, the law school has risen to 8th for its part-time program.

== History ==
In 1997, then Governor Bob Miller signed into law a bill authorizing the creation of the William S. Boyd School of Law of the University of Nevada, Las Vegas (UNLV). One year later, in 1998, the Boyd School of Law opened its doors to 140 charter class students and the school moved into its permanent facilities in August 2002. In 2000, the school secured provisional American Bar Association (ABA) accreditation and, in February 2003, secured full ABA accreditation. The first class graduated from the Boyd School of Law in May 2001. In January 2004, the William S. Boyd School of Law of the University of Nevada, Las Vegas joined the Association of American Law Schools.

The current dean is Leah Chan Grinvald.

== Academics ==
=== Admissions ===
For the class entering in 2023, the school accepted 33.59% of applicants, with 42.53% of those accepted enrolling. The average enrollee had a 160 LSAT score and 3.78 undergraduate GPA.

=== Degrees and programs ===
It awards the Juris Doctor (J.D.) degree and has a student body of approximately 440 students. It also awards dual degrees—including the Juris Doctor and Master of Business Administration (J.D./MBA), the Juris Doctor and Master of Social Work (J.D./M.S.W.), and the Juris Doctor and Doctor of Philosophy in Education (J.D./Ph.D.)—as well as a Master of Laws (LL.M.) in Gaming law and Regulation. All first-year law students are required to participate in a Community Service Program and spend substantial time providing legal information to people in the community who do not have access to lawyers. In partnership with the Legal Aid Center of Southern Nevada Pro Bono Project, law students prepare and present workshops at numerous locations in their community, on basic legal matters such as small claims court procedure, criminal record sealing, family law and divorce, bankruptcy, guardianship, and paternity/custody matters. The school is home to the Saltman Center for Conflict Resolution and the Thomas & Mack Legal Clinic.

=== Rankings ===
The law school secured its position as one of the country's top 100 law schools for the 15th consecutive year, ranked 89th in 2023, with its Lawyering Process Program ranked second in the U.S. and its Saltman Center for Conflict Resolution ranked tied for ninth among the top dispute resolution programs, according to U.S. News & World Report Best Colleges 2024 rankings of graduate schools and specialty programs. The law school's part-time program is ranked 8th in the country.

In 2020, National Jurist's PreLaw magazine gave UNLV a grade of "A−" for diversity, facilities, and value, and a grade of "A" for employment outcomes.

== Law library ==
The Wiener-Rogers Law Library is the largest law library in the state of Nevada, and the only law library in Nevada maintaining comprehensive collections of United States legal materials. The Wiener-Rogers Law Library also serves as a resource and archive for the entire state, providing services and making its collections accessible to researchers across disciplines and to members of the general public.

The Law Library is a participant in the federal government and European Union depository programs.

== Publications ==
In 2001, the Nevada Law Journal (NLJ) published its inaugural issue. In 2010, the UNLV Gaming Law Journal published its inaugural issue. It is the only Gaming Law Journal in the country.

NLJ is a journal of legal scholarship dedicated to analyzing the law and policy implications of significant case law, legislation, administrative regulations and important legal events. The NLJ publishes at least three issues per year and includes submissions by legal practitioners, professors, and students of the William S. Boyd School of Law. Additionally, topics concerning legal symposia, surveys, and tributes to important figures of the law are included.

In 2007, the Nevada Law Journal was ranked 91st by author prominence in Law Library Journal. Washington and Lee University School of Law currently ranks NLJ 59th among 243 flagship and general interest law reviews in the United States.

== Employment ==
According to the Boyd School of Law's 2014 ABA-required disclosures, 84.9 percent of Boyd's Class of 2014 was employed 10 months after graduation. 71.2 percent of the class was working in full-time, long-term jobs for which bar passage is required or a J.D. is preferred.

== Costs ==
Tuition at the Boyd School of Law for the 2022–2023 academic year is $40,900 for full-time non-Nevada residents and $28,000 for full-time Nevada residents.
