= Golden Arm =

Term for a temporarily successful craps player

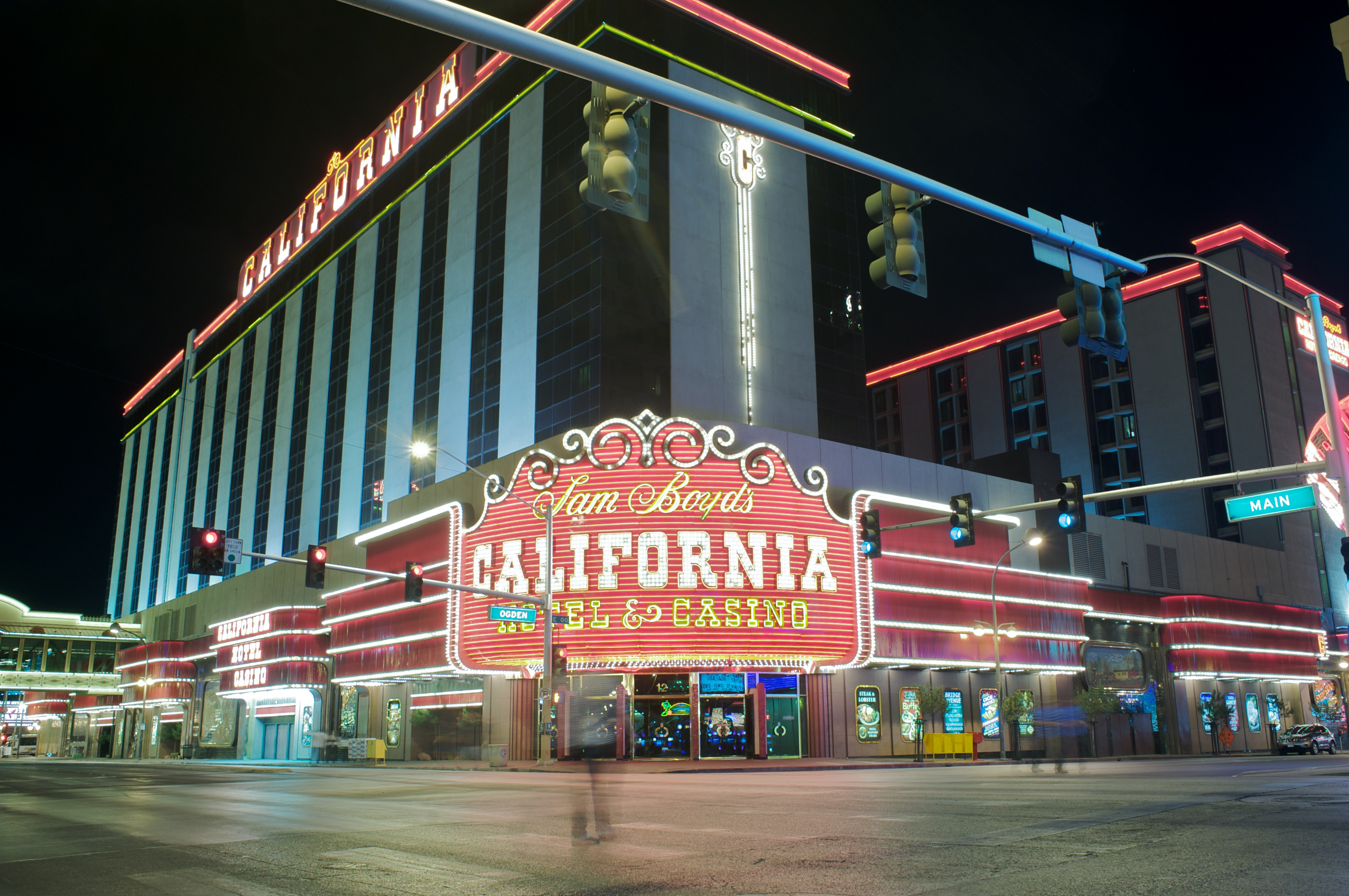
The California Hotel and Casino, where the term originated

A Golden Arm is a craps player who has rolled dice for over one hour without losing. The designation was created by the California Hotel and Casino in 1989 after Stanley Fujitake rolled 118 times for three hours and six minutes without sevening out.

The California Hotel and Casino had lost more than $1 million. Fujitake had won about $30,000. In 1999, the Platinum Arm Club was formed honoring players who roll for over 90 minutes or over an hour on at least two occasions.

On May 23–24, 2009 Patricia DeMauro of New Jersey rolled 154 times including 25 passes over a period of 4 hours and 18 minutes at the Borgata in Atlantic City, New Jersey. This remains the current record. She bested Fujitake's record – that had stood for almost 20 years – by over an hour.
