= Sam Boyd =

American businessman (1910–1993)

- Born: April 23, 1910; Enid, Oklahoma, U.S.
- Died: January 15, 1993 (aged 82); Las Vegas, Nevada, U.S.
- Resting place: Palm Memorial Park, Las Vegas
- Occupations: Entrepreneur, casino manager and developer
- Years active: 1928–1993
- Known for: Co-founder of Boyd Gaming; namesake of Sam's Town casinos

Samuel Addison Boyd (April 23, 1910 – January 15, 1993) was an American entrepreneur, casino manager and developer. He was noted for introducing successful marketing, gambling and entertainment innovations into the casino gambling industry, as well as building one of the largest and most successful casino empires in the world, Boyd Gaming.

== Biography ==
Born in Enid, Oklahoma, Boyd began his career in the gambling industry in 1928, when he ran bingo games on a gambling ship offshore Long Beach, California. Just prior to the US entering World War II in 1941, Boyd moved to Las Vegas, Nevada. Boyd was able to quickly make his way up through the gambling industry by initially working as a croupier. He later went on to hold a variety of jobs in the industry, moving between Reno and Lake Tahoe before moving back to Las Vegas.

Having saved up a substantial amount of cash, in 1952 Boyd invested $10,000 to become an owner-partner at the Sahara. Later, he became general manager and partner at The Mint in downtown Las Vegas, where he began introducing marketing campaigns and the innovations which made him famous. Boyd later began developing and purchasing casinos throughout the Las Vegas area, continuing to introduce innovative marketing. He was credited with helping build a large Hawaiian community in Las Vegas, through his marketing techniques catered toward visitors from the Hawaiian Islands.

With the construction and completion of Boyd's California Hotel and Casino in 1975, he and his son co-founded Boyd Gaming, which would become one of the largest gambling and casino management corporations in the world. Several hotel-casinos branded Sam's Town Hotel and Gambling Hall, along with UNLV's Sam Boyd Stadium, are named in his honor; the 2006 album by The Killers, Sam's Town, is named after one of his casinos.

Boyd married Mary Neumann in 1931. They had their only child, Bill Boyd, within a year. Sam Boyd died on January 15, 1993, at the age of 82 at a local hospital in Las Vegas after lengthy illnesses. He was interred at the Palm Memorial Park in Las Vegas.
