= Architecture of Las Vegas =

Interest in the architecture of Las Vegas began in the late 1960s, when in 1967 architects Robert Venturi and Denise Scott Brown traveled to the city accompanied by students in order to study its architecture. They wrote, with Steven Izenour, a report in 1972 on the subject entitled Learning From Las Vegas: the Forgotten Symbolism of Architectural Form. This report, and its thesis that Las Vegas showed the way for architecture in the late 20th century, drew the attention of the architectural world to the city. A quarter of a century later, for a BBC programme (a segment of The Late Show entitled "Virtually Las Vegas" broadcast on BBC Two on 1995-01-16) Venturi and Scott Brown revisited the city, and revised their opinions.

== Initial thesis ==
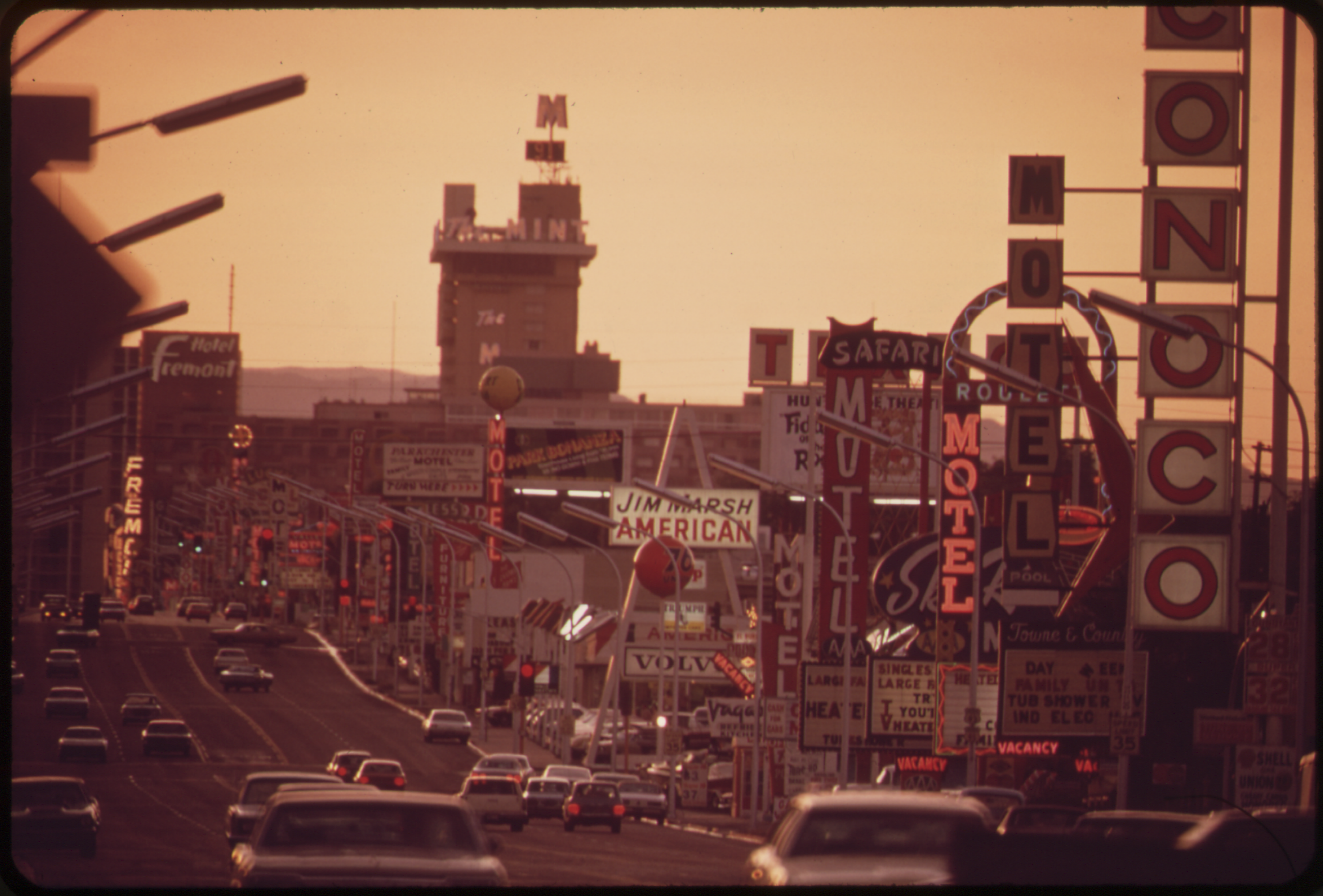
View north along Las Vegas Boulevard directed towards Fremont Street intersection (photographed by Charles O'Rear in May 1972 for DOCUMERICA)

In the 1970s, Venturi et al. observed that the city had then been structured around the automotive culture that was dominant at the time, with all of the buildings oriented towards the highway. It was the norm for buildings to have "rhetorical front and conventional behind", in other words a decorated façade visible from the highway but a less decorative aspect where not visible. The casinos and motels also sported ground-level parking at the front, between the building and the highway, a feature that Venturi considered to be distinctive. They also drew a contrast between the artificially lit and air conditioned interiors of the buildings and the heat and glare of the "agoraphobic auto-scaled desert" outside. The mixture of styles, ranging from what they termed "Miami Moroccan" to "Yamasaki-Bernini cum Roman Orgiastic", they did not view as chaotic but rather as a necessary result of Las Vegas as one of what they termed "the world's 'pleasure zones'" alongside the likes of Marienbad, the Alhambra, Disneyland, and Xanadu and its positioning as a place where a visitor with an ordinary life could indulge in escapist notions of being "a centurion at Caesar's Palace, a ranger at The Frontier, or a jetsetter at the Riviera" for a few days.

== 1990s revision ==
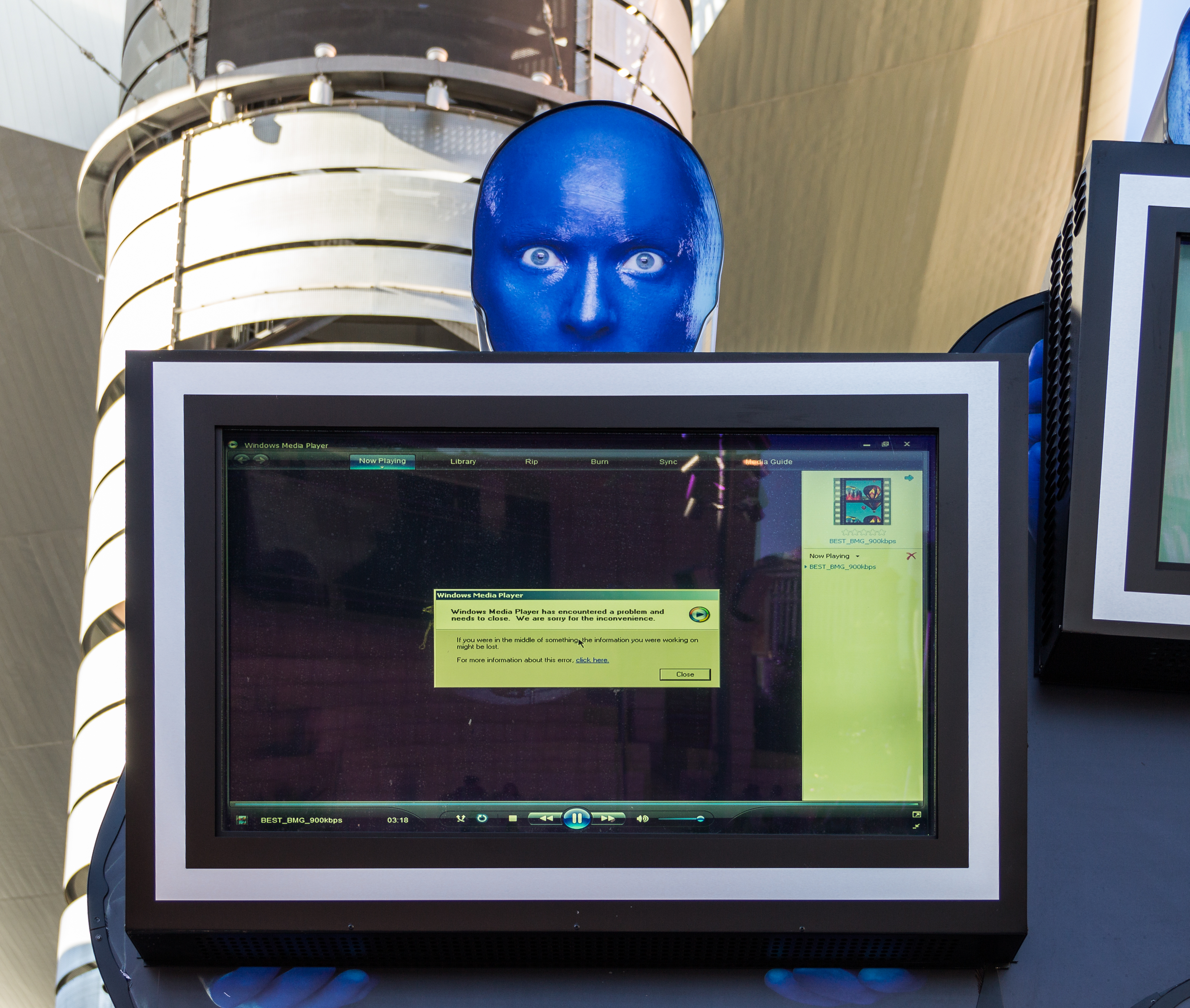
Large video sign in Las Vegas displaying an error message (2012)

In the 1990s, Venturi and Scott Brown observed that the automotive-driven architecture of the 1960s had been transformed into a more pedestrianized form, in part as a result of the growth in visitors that it had experienced over the years. The distinctive neon lighting, that in the 1960s had had Venturi et al. talking of Vegas as a city of signs, had been replaced by giant television screens, which Venturi bemoaned. In their original book, and in the later 1977 revised edition, they had focussed upon characterizing Vegas in terms of how most if not all built objects in the (then) city in one way or another functioned as signage. In the 1990s, Mark C. Taylor opined that the similarities between Disney and Las Vegas that Venturi et al. had touched upon in the 1970s had grown immensely over the years, with much of the urban space being thematized and devoted to fantasies upon fantasies and "worlds within worlds". He observed that this architectural link to Disney had even been made concrete, with the MGM Grand Hotel directly mimicking (albeit with some differences) the original Walt Disney World.

Taylor also observed the replacement of neon with the televisual, to create a vast visual space in which "the virtual becomes real and the real becomes virtual". As an example of this he propounded new Fremont Street, where "city planners have converted the train terminal that was inspired by the glass architecture of Parisian arcades, into a computer terminal", with a 1,500 feet (460 m) canopy comprising 1.4 million computer-controlled lights and lasers.

== Notable works ==
=== 1900s ===
- SP, LA & SL Railroad station – 1905 [demolished 1939]
- First State Bank – 1906, 100 Fremont Street [demolished 1957]
- Christ Church Episcopal – 1908, 129 S. 2nd Street [demolished 1954]
- SP, LA & SL Railroad cottages – 1909 [32 built, some preserved]

=== 1910s ===
- Clark County Courthouse – 1914, Frederic DeLongchamps [demolished 1957]

=== 1920s ===
- El Portal Theatre – 1928, Charles Alexander MacNelledge, 310 Fremont Street
- Las Vegas High School – 1929, George A. Ferris & Son, 315 S. 7th Street

=== 1930s ===
- Las Vegas Post Office and Courthouse – 1931, 300 E. Stewart Avenue
- Hotel Apache – 1932, A. Lacy Worswick, 109 S. 2nd Street
- Las Vegas Grammar School – 1936, Orville L. Clark, 401 S. Las Vegas Boulevard
- War Memorial Building – 1936, Works Progress Administration, 400 Stewart Avenue [demolished 1971]
- Union Pacific station – 1939, Henry L. Gogerty [demolished 1970]
- St. Joan of Arc Catholic Church – 1939, 315 S. Casino Center Blvd

=== 1940s ===
- El Rancho Vegas – 1941, Wayne McAllister [burned down 1960]
- Sears, Roebuck & Co. store – 1941, 601 Fremont Street
- Hotel Last Frontier – 1942, William J. Moore [demolished 1964]
- Huntridge Theater – 1944, S. Charles Lee, 1208 E. Charleston Boulevard
- Hotel Flamingo – 1946, Richard Stadelman [demolished]
- Fremont Theatre – 1947, Douglas Burton, 202 Fremont Street [demolished]
- F. W. Woolworth store – 1948, 420 Fremont Street [demolished 1999]

=== 1950s ===
- Desert Inn – 1950, Hugh E. Taylor [demolished]
- Friedman Building – 1950, Aloysius MacDonald, 300 Fremont Street
- Las Vegas Park – 1950, Paul R. Williams and Arthur Froehlich [demolished 1965]
- Simon Building – 1951, A. Lacy Worswick and Elmo C. Bruner, 220 Fremont Street [demolished]
- J. C. Penney store – 1951, 520 Fremont Street
- Sahara Hotel – 1952, Max Maltzman
- Las Vegas High School Auditorium – 1952, Claud Beelman & Associates, 955 E. Clark Avenue
- Las Vegas Public Library – 1952, Vernon Welborn, 400 E. Mesquite Avenue
- Sands Hotel – 1952, Wayne McAllister [demolished]
- Royal Nevada – 1954, Paul R. Williams and John Replogle [demolished 2007]
- Riviera Hotel – 1954, Roy F. France & Son [demolished 2016]
- New Frontier – 1955, Albert Criz [demolished 1964]
- Fremont Hotel – 1955, Wayne McAllister, 200 Fremont Street
- The Hacienda – 1955, Homer Rissman [demolished 1996]
- The Dunes – 1955, John Replogle and Robert Dorr Jr. [demolished 1994]
- Cyril S. Wengert Building (for the Southern Nevada Power Company) – 1956, Welton Becket & Associates, 230 N 4th Street [addition in 1960; demolished 2006-09]
- Clark County Courthouse – 1956, Welton Becket & Associates, 200 S. 3rd Street [demolished 2014]
- The Tropicana – 1957, M. Tony Sherman [demolished 2024]
- The Mint – 1957, Zick & Sharp, 100 Fremont Street [demolished]
- Las Vegas Convention Center – 1959, Adrian J. Wilson [demolished 1990]
- Southern Nevada Telephone Building – 1957, 125 S. Las Vegas Boulevard
- Nevada State Bank branch – 1959, Ira C. Marshak, 201 S. 4th Street [demolished 2010]

=== 1960s ===
- McCarran International Airport Terminal – 1960, Welton Becket & Associates
- La Concha Motel – 1961, Paul R. Williams
- Landmark – 1961, Gerald Moffitt and Edward Hendricks, 364 Convention Center Drive [demolished 1995]
- Frontier Fidelity Savings & Loan Association – 1962, Hagman & Meyer, 801 E. Charleston Boulevard
- Guardian Angel Cathedral – 1963, Paul R. Williams, 302 Cathedral Way
- Sands Hotel (reconstruction) – 1964, Martin Stern Jr. [demolished 1996]
- The Mint (tower addition) – 1964, Martin Stern Jr.
- The Dunes (tower addition) – 1964, Milton M. Schwartz [demolished 1994]
- Foley Federal Building – 1964, Zick & Sharp, 300 S. Las Vegas Boulevard
- First National Bank of Nevada Building – 1964, Harold Berry with Zick & Sharp, 302 E. Carson Avenue
- Executive Tower – 1964, Herman Fidler, 401 S. 3rd Street [demolished 1998]
- Caesars Palace – 1965, Melvin Grossman
- Bank of Nevada Building – 1965, Kent Attridge & Associates, 225 Bridger Avenue
- Las Vegas Cinerama – 1965, Perry Neuschatz, 3900 Paradise Road [demolished 1984]
- The Frontier – 1966, Rissman & Rissman [demolished 2007]
- Las Vegas Country Club clubhouse – 1967, Julius Gabrielle
- International Hotel – 1968, Martin Stern Jr.

=== 1970s ===
- Nevada National Bank branch – 1970, Edward Hendricks, 233 S. 4th Street
- Union Plaza Hotel – 1970, Stanley J. How with Zick & Sharp
- MGM Grand – 1972, Martin Stern Jr.
- Valley Bank Plaza – 1973, Albert C. Martin & Associates, 300 S. 4th Street
- Las Vegas City Hall – 1973, Daniel, Mann, Johnson & Mendenhall, 400 Stewart Avenue
- Nevada Savings & Loan – 1974, Zick & Sharp, 201 S. Las Vegas Boulevard
- Flamingo Hilton (tower addition) – 1975, Rissman & Rissman
