= Bell & Beckwith =

Defunct stock brokerage firm in Ohio

- Company type: Private
- Industry: Finance
- Founded: 1898
- Headquarters: Toledo, Ohio, United States
- Key people: Ted Wolfram (Managing partner)

Bell & Beckwith was a regional stock brokerage firm in Toledo, Ohio, that failed in 1983 as a result of massive fraud. It was the costliest failure for the Securities Investor Protection Corporation (SIPC) at that time.

== History ==
Bell & Beckwith, a partnership, started in 1898 as Secor & Bell and changed its name in 1921. The firm was seized and declared insolvent in February 1983. At that time it had 7,000 customers with accounts of $110 million.

Edward P. "Ted" Wolfram, Jr. was the firm's managing partner. Beginning in 1973, he embezzled $32 million (or $47 million including interest) by diverting cash and securities in customer accounts. He set up accounts in his wife's (Zula Wolfram) name or business accounts under her name. He vastly overstated the value of the collateral underlying the loans he took out on these accounts. He held 2,816 shares of stock in Toto, Ltd., a Japanese manufacturer of plumbing fixtures, which he had valued at $278 million, but were actually worth only $5,000. Bonds supposedly held by a Las Vegas bank, and worth $100 million, in fact never existed.

Ted Wolfram, under his wife's name bought a jet aircraft, cattle farms in Arkansas and Missouri, a horse ranch in Ocala, Florida, an oil exploration company in Baton Rouge, Louisiana, and 17 collector cars. He also purchased the Landmark Hotel and Casino in Las Vegas, Nevada in 1978. The Landmark, located off the Las Vegas Strip, was a big money-losing venture that swallowed up $15 million from operating losses during the time that he owned the hotel. The SIPC recovered only $7.7 million from the sale of Wolfram's assets, including a net $4 million from the sale of the Landmark Hotel.

Ted Wolfram pleaded guilty in September 1983 to four counts of securities fraud and one count of falsifying a Federal report. He was sentenced to 25 years in prison and served 10 years. It took 14 years to settle the firm's bankruptcy estate. The firm's other partners were sanctioned by the Securities and Exchange Commission and were bankrupted by the fraud.
