= UNLV School of Architecture =

Department of the University of Nevada, Las Vegas

- Other names: UNLV SoA
- Parent institution: University of Nevada, Las Vegas
- Director: Daniel (Danny) Ortega
- Location: Las Vegas, Nevada, 89154; 36.1023°N 115.1388°W
- Website: unlv.edu/architecture

The School of Architecture is part of the College of Fine Arts at University of Nevada, Las Vegas. It was accredited by the National Architectural Accrediting Board in October 1997 and currently provides the only program accredited for architecture in the state of Nevada. The school offers a Bachelor of Science in architecture, interior architecture and landscape architecture. It also offers a master of architecture as a professional degree and a master of healthcare interior design.

== Buildings ==
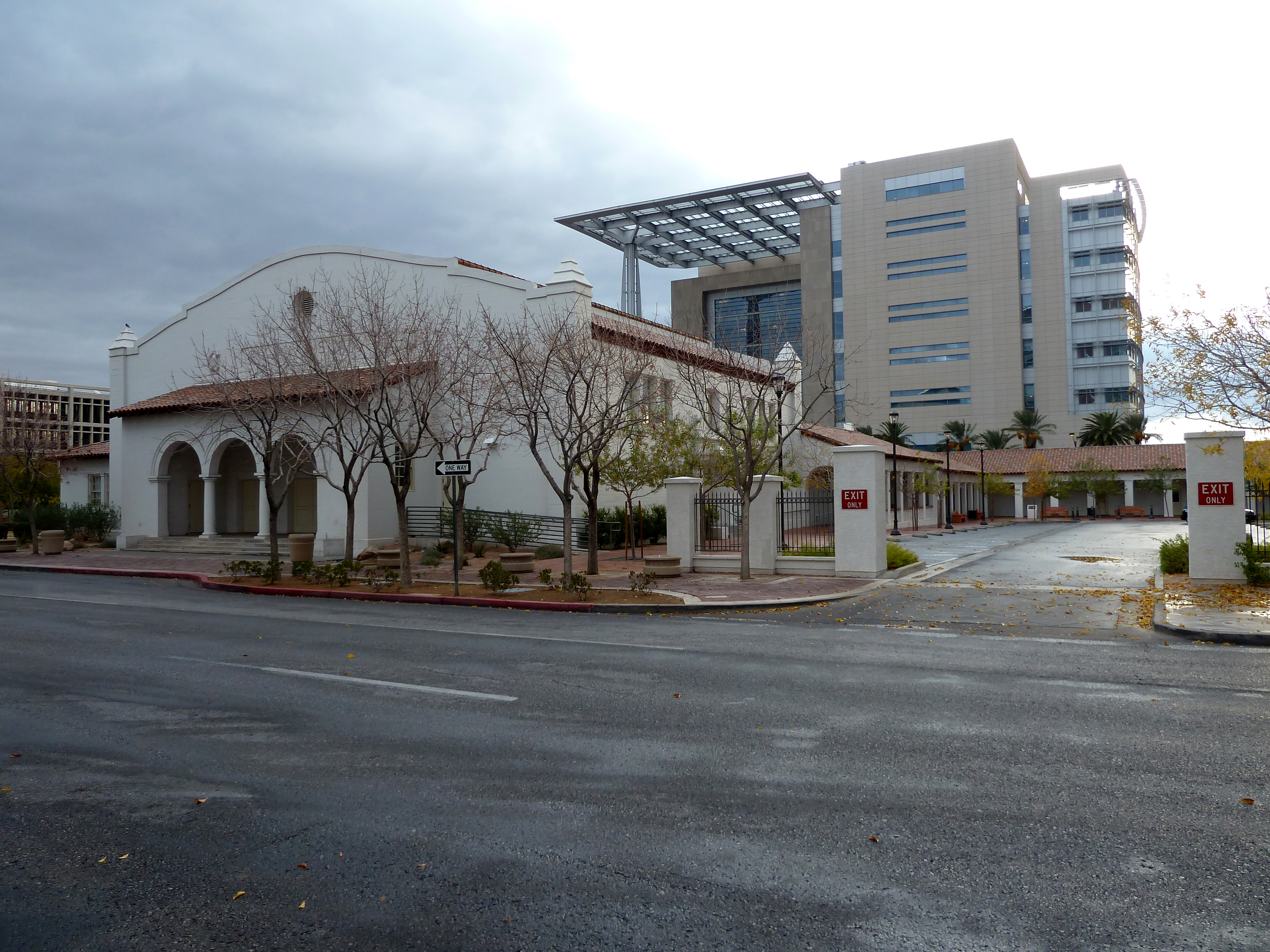
The Downtown Design Center is located in a historic school building.

The School of Architecture is located in the Paul B. Sogg Architecture Building located on the Southeast corner of UNLV's campus on Brussels Road close to Maryland Parkway and Tropicana Ave in Las Vegas, Nevada. The 75,000-square-foot (7,000 m^{2}) facility was named after the developer Paul B. Sogg, who donated towards the building's construction. The building cost $8.25 million and was designed by SH Architecture (formerly Swisher & Hall, AIA Ltd.) of Las Vegas. Facilities inside the structure include the Architecture Studies Library, which provides a wide selection of services catered to students within the School of Architecture, as well as the architectural community throughout Las Vegas. An addition to the original structure was completed in 2004 to provide more studio space and offices. This new addition was designed by DPHS Architects and cost $1.6 million.

In the fall of 2008, the Downtown Design Center opened in the historic Fifth Street School, a former primary school listed on the National Register of Historic Places on Clark Avenue and Las Vegas Boulevard (previously 5th Street) in downtown Las Vegas. The Downtown Design Center hosts specialized studios, the Klai Juba Wald lecture series, and is home to the state and local chapter of the American Institute of Architects.
