= Edward P. Wolfram Jr. =

Edward P. Wolfram, Jr.
- Born: Ohio
- Died: 2018
- Other names: Ted Wolfram, Jr.

Edward P. Wolfram Jr. or Ted Wolfram Jr. was the managing partner of the American brokerage company Bell & Beckwith. He was later a public speaker. Wolfram was incarcerated for violating Federal securities law after defrauding his company, causing the closure of the 85-year-old Toledo firm. At the time of his sentencing, his conviction was considered an uncommonly long sentence for a securities fraud case.

== Fraud and conviction ==
In February 1983, federal investigators led by SEC compliance examiner Ralph Buie uncovered a $47.3 million shortage of collateral in six margin accounts owned by Wolfram's wife Zula. The deficit was created mainly through cash withdrawals that were backed by collateral worth $389 million. By February 7, the investigators shut down Bell & Beckwith. Four days later the institution was declared insolvent, freezing the accounts of its 7,000 clients.

Wolfram later confessed to diverting funds from Bell & Beckwith to buy a casino and hotel in Las Vegas, farm and cattle ranches in Florida and Arkansas, and a Louisiana oil company. He was indicted in a federal grand jury and pleaded guilty to all five counts of indictment, which included four counts of securities fraud and one count of falsification of an SEC document. In his court testimony, Wolfram admitted to misappropriating $32 million of his company's assets through by padding stock prices, borrowing against them, and transferring them via illegal wire transactions. On September 6, 1983, Wolfram was sentenced to 25 years of imprisonment. The fraud case was considered the largest single theft from a stock brokerage during that time.

Public administrative proceedings were also instituted against Wolfram by the Chicago Regional Office of the Securities and Exchange Commission for willful violation of Federal securities law. The commission accepted Wolfram's settlement offer, which included a consent to the order barring him from any association with any broker, dealer, municipal securities dealer, investment adviser, and investment company.

Wolfram became a public speaker after serving time in jail. In his speaking engagements, he often talked about his regrets and his lost honor. He used to lecture MBA students from Pepperdine College on white-collar crime.
