= Ed W. Clark High School =

American public high school in Nevada

Coordinates: 36.13623°N 115.1976°W

- 4291 Pennwood Avenue, Las Vegas, Nevada 89102

Information
- Type: Public
- Motto: Educating Today... for Tomorrow.
- Established: 1965; 61 years ago
- NCES School ID: 320006000030
- Principal: Zeola Braxton
- Faculty: 153.0 FTEs
- Enrollment: 2,801 (as of 2024–25)
- Student to teacher ratio: 18.3:1
- Campus: Metropolitan
- Colors: Black and Gold
- Nickname: Chargers
- Website: www.clarkchargers.org

Ed W. Clark High School is a public high school in Las Vegas, Nevada, that is part of the Clark County School District. Opened in 1965, it serves grades 9 - 12 on a traditional nine-month schedule. The school offers several specialized programs, including the Academy of Mathematics, Science, Arts and Technology (A.M.S.A.T.), Teacher Education at Clark High (T.E.A.C.H.) and Academy of Finance (A.O.F.). Clark has been recognized for both academic and extracurricular achievements, and its magnet programs draw students from across the Las Vegas Valley.

As of the 2024–25 school year, the school had an enrollment of 2,801 students and 153.0 classroom teachers (on an FTE basis), for a student–teacher ratio of 18.3:1. There were 2,772 students (99.0% of enrollment) eligible for free lunch and 29 (1.0% of students) eligible for reduced-cost lunch.

== History ==
Ed W. Clark High School opened in 1965 to serve the central Las Vegas Valley's growing population. It was designed by the architectural firm Zick & Sharp and built by the Del E. Webb Construction Company, a major contractor responsible for numerous projects in Nevada and the American West. It was named in honor of Ed W. Clark, a Nevada banker, businessman, and civic leader who played a significant role in the state's economic development in the early 20th century.

During its early decades, Clark functioned as a comprehensive neighborhood high school, offering general academic and extracurricular programs to students in its attendance zone. During the late 20th century, the school expanded its curriculum with the addition of magnet academics, aligning with the Clark County School District's efforts to increase specialized educational opportunities.

The Academy of Mathematics, Science, Arts and Technology (A.M.S.A.T.) and the Academy of Finance (A.O.F.) were among the first magnet programs at the school, followed by Teacher Education at Clark High (T.E.A.C.H.). These programs attracted students from across the Las Vegas metropolitan area and contributed to Clark's recognition as a Magnet School of Excellence.

Over time, the campus has grown to accommodate rising enrollment, with facilities for academics, athletics, and performing arts. By the 21st century, Clark High School was one of the district's largest schools, serving between 2,500 and 3,000 students.

In 2023, a Jewish student with autism had an apparent swastika scratched onto his back at school, according to his mother. The school district and local police investigated the incident but found "no evidence that would indicate the origin of the injuries". In June 2024, the district agreed to pay the family an unspecified amount to settle a case brought by the Lawfare Project and local firms against the district for its failure to maintain the student's safety.

== Magnet programs ==
- Academy of Finance (A.O.F.)
- Academy for Mathematics, Science, Arts and Technology (A.M.S.A.T.)
- Teacher Education At Clark High (T.E.A.C.H.)

== Notable alumni ==
- Paul Anderson, Nevada state assemblyman (class of 1988)
- Bob Beers, Las Vegas city councilman, Nevada state senator (class of 1977)
- Nick Bell, professional football player (class of 1987)
- Shirley Breeden, Nevada state senator
- Laura Dahl, fashion designer
- Brian Dallimore, MLB player
- John Ensign, U.S. senator (class of 1976)
- Robert Gamez, professional golfer (class of 1986)
- Phil Glover, NFL player (class of 1994)
- Steven Horsford, U.S. representative (class of 1991)
- Jimmy Kimmel, talk show host and comedian (class of 1985)
- Catherine Cortez Masto, U.S. senator (class of 1982)
- Ron Merkerson, NFL player
- Uhunoma Osazuwa, Olympic athlete (class of 2006)
- Ardis Parshall, historian
- Louis Prima Jr., jazz musician (class of 1983)
- Rory Reid, Clark County commissioner
- Ron Riley, professional basketball player (class of 1992)
- Sam Smith, NBA player (class of 1973)
- Willie Smith, NBA player (class of 1972)
- Ronnie Vannucci Jr., drummer for The Killers
- Daliah Wachs, talk show host, author (class of 1989)

== Performing arts ==
Clark High School Performing Arts Center.

Jesus Christ Superstar Marquee.

Clark High School is home to a number of performing groups, including the orchestra, band, mariachi, and choir.

There is a beginning orchestra for any student wishing to learn to play a classical string instrument, and intermediate and advanced orchestras for more experienced players. More proficient musicians may opt to audition for the chamber orchestra, which challenges students with a considerably advanced repertoire.

Once marching season ends the marching band divides into two bands for the winter and spring seasons: the symphonic band (for intermediate musicians) and the wind ensemble (for advanced musicians). A drumline performs during the winter season, and there is a jazz band which has performed at Disneyland and on KLVX's Inside Education.

The chorus consists of several different groups. These include: all-men, all-women, jazz, concert, advanced, and chamber choirs.

Clark's full orchestra (consisting of orchestra and band) performed at Carnegie Hall in New York in 2008, 2012, and 2019. In March 2015, Clark's chamber orchestra performed at an ASTA national competition at Abravanel Hall in Salt Lake City. They placed as national and grand champions.

== Weekend programs ==
Las Vegas Gakuen (ラスベガス学園), a Japanese weekend supplementary school, is held every Saturday at Clark High School. It was founded in September 1995.

== International sport ==
In March 2024, the school hosted a test match between the United States and Canada national rugby league team.
