= Landmark (hotel and casino) =

Former casino hotel in Las Vegas, Nevada

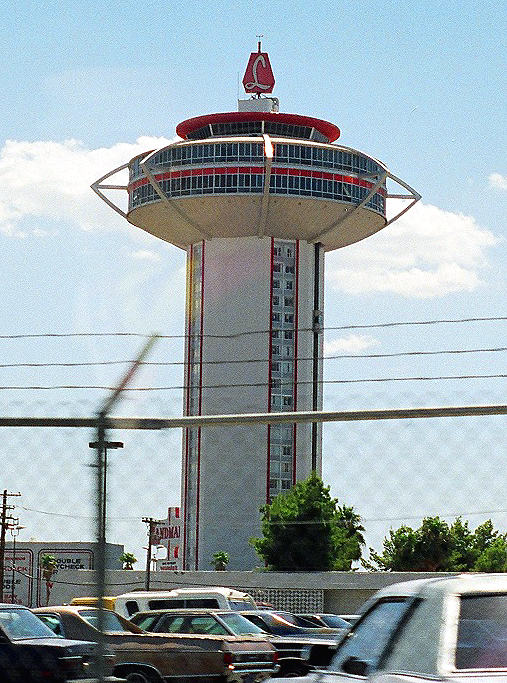
- The Landmark in 1986, four years before closure, and nine years before implosion
- Interactive map of Landmark
- Location: Winchester, Nevada, U.S.; 364 Convention Center Drive; 36.133051°N 115.155808°W
- Opened: July 1, 1969
- Closed: August 8, 1990; 36 years ago
- Theme: Incan; Space Age
- No. of rooms: 503 (1969); 524 (1977); 498 (1990)
- Gaming space: 14,000 sq ft (1,300 m^{2}) (ground floor); 3,000 sq ft (280 m^{2}) (29th floor)
- Casino type: Land
- Owner: List: Frank Caroll (original owner) Plaza Tower, Inc (1966–69) Hughes Tool Company (1969–73) Summa Corporation (1973–78) Lou and Jo Ann Tickel (1978–80) Zula Wolfram (1978–83) Bill Morris (1983–90) Lloyds Bank (1990–93) Las Vegas Convention and Visitors Authority (1993–95)
- Architect: Initial design: Gerald Moffitt; Ed Hendricks; 1966 design: George Tate; Thomas Dobrusky
- Renovated in: 1971, 1983

The Landmark (Note: Commonly known simply as the "Landmark". During the 1960s, it was also known as "Landmark Tower", and sometimes as "Landmark Hotel"; the latter name was in common usage from 1969 onward. "Landmark Hotel and Casino" received some usage as well.) was a hotel and casino located in Winchester, Nevada, United States, east of the Las Vegas Strip and across from the Las Vegas Convention Center. Frank Caroll, the project's original owner, purchased the property in 1961. Fremont Construction began work on the tower that September, while Caroll opened the adjacent Landmark Plaza shopping center and Landmark Apartments by the end of the year. The tower's completion was expected for early 1963, but because of a lack of financing, construction was stopped in 1962, with the resort approximately 80 percent complete. Up to 1969, the topped-off tower was the tallest building in Nevada until the completion of the International Hotel across the street.

In 1966, the Central Teamsters Pension Fund provided a $5.5 million construction loan to finish the project, with ownership transferred to a group of investors that included Caroll and his wife. The Landmark's completion and opening was delayed several more times. In April 1968, Caroll withdrew his request for a gaming license after he was charged with assault and battery against the project's interior designer. The Landmark was put up for sale that month.

Billionaire Howard Hughes, through Hughes Tool Company, purchased the Landmark in 1969 at a cost of $17.3 million. Hughes spent approximately $3 million to add his own touches to the resort before opening it on July 1, 1969, with 400 slot machines and 503 hotel rooms. In addition to a 14,000 sq ft (1,300 m^{2}) ground-floor casino, the resort also had a second, smaller casino on the 29th floor; it was the first high-rise casino in Nevada. Aside from the second casino, the five-story cupola dome at the top of the tower also featured restaurants, lounges, and a night club.

During the 1970s, the Landmark became known for its performances by country music artists. The resort also played host to celebrities such as Danny Thomas and Frank Sinatra. However, the resort suffered financial problems after its opening and underwent several ownership changes, none of which resulted in success. The Landmark entered bankruptcy in 1985, and ultimately closed on August 8, 1990, unable to compete with new megaresorts. The Las Vegas Convention and Visitors Authority purchased the property in September 1993, and demolished the resort in November 1995, to add a 2,200-space parking lot for its convention center. In 2019, work was underway on a convention center expansion which includes the former site of the Landmark. The Las Vegas Convention Center's West Hall expansion opened on the site in June 2021.

== History ==
Frank Caroll, also known as Frank Caracciolo, was a building developer from Kansas City. In 1960, he and his wife Susan decided to construct a hotel-casino and shopping center in Las Vegas. Frank Caroll received a gaming license that year. In 1961, the Carolls purchased 22 acres (8.9 ha) of land at the northwest corner of Convention Center Drive and Paradise Road in Winchester, Nevada, approximately half a mile east of the Las Vegas Strip and across from the Las Vegas Convention Center. Aside from a gas station, the property was vacant.

=== Construction (1961–1968) ===
==== Commencement ====
The Landmark was initially planned as a 14-story hotel with a casino, although the floor count increased as the project progressed. Fremont Construction, owned by Louis P. Scherer of Redlands, California, began construction of the tower at the end of September 1961, under a $1.5 million contract. Frank Caroll's company, Caroll Construction Company, also worked on the tower. At the start of construction, the tower was to include 20 stories, while completion was planned for early 1963. The tower was built on a five-foot-thick base of concrete and steel, measuring 80 feet in diameter and resting on a base of caliche that descended 30 feet into the ground. Consolidated Construction Company was the concrete subcontractor for the tower.

By December 1961, Caroll had opened the two-story Landmark Plaza shopping center, built out in an L-shape at the base of the tower. The Landmark Apartments, with 120 units, were also built near the tower and operational by the end of 1961. In 1962, a bar known as Shannon's Saloon and a western music radio station, KVEG, began operating in the Landmark Plaza. In addition to studios, KVEG also had its offices in the shopping center.

By February 1962, the tower was planned to include 31 floors, making it the tallest building in Nevada. While plans for a separate hotel structure were being made, work began on the tower by pouring concrete on a continuous 24-hour schedule. The concrete pour was done with a slip forming method. With 21 floors expected to be added to the tower over a 12-day period, it was expected to reach the 24th floor by the end of the month. In March 1962, at the request of Caroll, Clark County Commissioners removed a restriction which specified that gaming licenses could only be issued for ground-level casinos, as Caroll wanted to open a casino on the second floor of the Landmark's shopping center. That month, Caroll received a $450,000 loan from Appliance Buyers Credit Corporation (ABCC), a subsidiary of RCA-Whirlpool.

Construction had reached the 26th floor by the end of April 1962. Upon completion of the floor, work was to begin on the tower's bubble dome. By June 1962, ABCC loaned an additional $300,000 to Caroll, who reached his $3 million loan limit with the company. Caroll ultimately owed ABCC a total of $3.5 million. In August 1962, the Landmark tower was designated as a civilian fallout shelter, with the capacity to hold 3,500 people after its completion. That month, work was underway on the steel framework base for the tower's glass bubble dome.

By September 1962, the Landmark tower was nearing completion and had become the tallest building in Las Vegas and the state, being visible from 20 miles away. By that time, many stores in the Landmark Plaza had closed due to falling debris that included welding sparks, steel, tools, rivets, and cement. A construction delay occurred in September 1962, when shipments of steel for the tower's dome were deemed inadequate and crews had to wait for new shipments. Construction was progressing rapidly on the tower's dome during October 1962, with steel and concrete still being added to the tower. Completion was still scheduled for early 1963. The Aluminium Division of Apex Steel Corporation Limited was contracted to install a $40,000 aluminum undershine on the tower's dome, to provide a maintenance-free and clean-looking appearance for viewers on the ground. Crews used scaffolding and hoists to reach the area where aluminum sheets needed to be placed. Each day, it took crews 18 minutes to be lifted up. Due to delays arising from strong winds, it took crews two months for the aluminium to be attached.

==== Delay ====
In December 1962, construction of the tower was stopped when ABCC denied further funding and alleged that the Carolls had defaulted on payments. The 31-story tower had been topped off and the resort was approximately 80 percent complete, with $5 million already spent on the project. The tower's planned opening was delayed until April 1963, but it did not occur as scheduled. In May 1963, ABCC was planning a sale of the apartments, shopping center, and unfinished tower for the following month. The Carolls sought to halt the sale, and filed a $2.1 million damage suit against ABCC, alleging that the company stopped construction and refused to pay the contractors. An injunction against foreclosure was granted in June 1963, but was dissolved the following year. In October 1964, a sale of the tower was approved for later that month, after being requested by ABCC, which was still owed $3.5 million by Landmark Plaza Corporation. Up to that time, the tower had been appraised several times and was valued between $8 million and $9 million. Ownership subsequently changed, as did the resort's design plans.

In August 1965, Maury Friedman was working on a deal with RCA Victor to convert the Landmark's tower and apartment buildings into office space. By the following month, Inter-Nation Tower, Inc. – a Beverly Hills-based corporation – was negotiating with RCA-Whirlpool to develop the tower and adjacent land as an international market place, an idea that was supported by local retailers and resorts. In December 1965, architect Gerald Moffitt said the Landmark's design had gone through many revisions and that his design plans had been impounded by a court; a spokesman said there were no plans to resume construction in the near future. It was estimated that an additional six months were needed to complete the tower.

The unfinished tower became an eyesore for visitors to the nearby convention center. During its vacancy, people noted that the building appeared to be tilted, similar to the Leaning Tower of Pisa; experts stated that this was an illusion caused when the building was viewed with nearby power poles, which were tilted rather than the building itself. Local residents nicknamed it the "Leaning Tower of Plaza", the "Leaning Tower of Las Vegas", and "Frank's Folly." Moffitt said, "It doesn't tilt. There is only three-eights of an inch difference in diameter from top to bottom." In May 1966, early negotiations were being held with a prospective buyer of the Landmark.

==== Resumption ====
In July 1966, new design plans were filed with the county for the completion of the tower. Scherer planned to acquire additional property for use as a parking lot to accommodate the redesigned project. In August 1966, the Central Teamsters Pension Fund provided a $5.5 million construction loan for the project. By that time, ownership had been transferred to Plaza Tower, Inc., made up of several investors, including the Carolls and Scherer, whose construction company was awarded a $2.5 million contract to finish the Landmark tower. Because of legal problems involved with the project, the acquisition of title required over 5,000 hours of legal work and the settlement of more than 40 lawsuits. Construction was underway again in early September 1966, with completion expected in early 1967. The shops and taverns in the Landmark Plaza were closed, and the shopping center and gas station were demolished, so the land around the tower could be used to construct a casino, a hotel lobby, offices, and new shops. The adjacent Landmark apartments were to be converted into hotel rooms for the new resort.

In November 1966, Caroll planned to install two slot machines inside the Landmark Coffee Shop, which sold food to construction workers from inside a temporary structure that was to become the site of a permanent building eventually. Caroll's plans were denied as his gaming license did not apply to the coffee shop. At the time, Caroll was also accused by sheriff Ralph Lamb of being uncooperative with police officers who were searching for a hoodlum at the Landmark Apartments.

The Landmark had been scheduled to open on September 15, 1967, but its opening was further delayed because of construction problems. A new opening date of November 15 was announced, with an official grand opening to be held on December 31, 1967. In early November 1967, Scherer was awarded a $2.2 million contract for the final construction phase of the Landmark. Construction crews worked 24 hours a day for each day of the week during the final phase to have the 650-seat dinner showroom theater ready for the planned New Year's Eve opening. Also included in the final phase were clothing and jewelry shops, as well as a recreation area with swimming pools and a 20-foot waterfall.

By the time of its planned New Year's Eve opening, the tower was nearly complete, with an opening now scheduled for mid-January 1968. Two groups – Plaza Tower Inc., the property's landlord group; and Plaza Tower Operating Corporation, the casino operating group – submitted a request for a gaming license to the Nevada Gaming Control Board, which investigates licensees and top casino employees prior to issuing gaming licenses. The Landmark's opening did not occur as scheduled.

During February and March 1968, the Landmark was declared as being completed, although it was stated the following year that some construction work remained unfinished. At the time of its stated completion in 1968, a total of 200,000 hours had been spent working on the project, which used 100,000 yards of concrete and 100 tons of steel. The tower occupied 8.21 acres (3.32 ha) of the property, and remained as the tallest building in the state.

=== Further developments (1968–1969) ===
==== Gaming license ====
In February 1968, an updated list of top casino employees was submitted to the gaming control board, which had up to 90 days to make a decision regarding the issuance of a gaming license. An opening date of mid-April 1968 was considered possible. In March 1968, the Nevada Gaming Control Board recommended against the issuance of a gaming license due to "inadequate financial capabilities and resources of the operating corporation and of its principal investor", referring to Caroll. However, the Nevada Gaming Commission had the Gaming Control Board reevaluate the license application.

On April 5, 1968, the Las Vegas media was given a tour of the Landmark. During the event, Caroll beat the Landmark's interior designer, Leonard Edward England, for allegedly flirting with Caroll's wife. Caroll was arrested on April 17, 1968, on charges of assault and battery against England. On April 22, 1968, Caroll withdrew his request for a gaming license, a decision that was approved two days later. The company then planned to receive new financing and to eventually submit a new gaming application. Approximately 600 people were expected to be employed at the Landmark upon its opening. The Landmark was put up for sale in April 1968, and the charges against Caroll were dropped two months later on the condition that he not renew his gaming license application.

==== Financial problems ====
In May 1968, the Teamsters Pension Fund filed a notice of breach on the trust deed, alleging that Caroll, Plaza Tower Inc. and Plaza Tower Operating had been defaulting on loan payments since October 1967. In late August 1968, the Las Vegas-based Supreme Mattress Company filed a lawsuit stating that it had only received $4,250 in payments for $25,505 worth of bedding material that was sold to the Landmark in December 1967.

On August 29, 1968, a joint petition was filed to declare the Landmark bankrupt. The petition was filed by Vegas Valley Electric, Inc., a plumbing contractor, and Landmark architects George Tate and Thomas Dobrusky. By that time, the Teamsters Union Pension Fund agreed to delay its foreclosure until the property was sold. Simultaneously, Sylvania Electric Company had intended to foreclose on the property because of an unpaid $3.7 million bill relating to electronic equipment installed in the Landmark. The joint petition prevented Sylvania from taking over ownership of the property.

==== Plane crash ====
On the night of August 2, 1968, Everett Wayne Shaw, a 39-year-old mechanic depressed by the break-up of his month-long marriage, stole a Cessna 180 plane as part of an apparent suicide attempt. Shaw flew the plane toward the Landmark tower and pulled up just before hitting it. The plane brushed the top of the tower before crashing into the Las Vegas Convention Center across the street, approximately 200 yards (180 m) away. Shaw was killed in the crash, which did not harm anyone else. Plane debris was found on the Landmark's roof and at its base, but the crash was not believed to have caused any damage to the building.

==== Sale negotiations and Howard Hughes ====
In July 1968, there were five firms interested in purchasing the Landmark, which was expected to sell for $16 million to $17 million. One of the firms, Olla Corporation, withdrew consideration of a purchase later that month, while an announcement of the resort's sale was expected within several days. Multiple companies made purchase offers that were ultimately rejected, including Rosco Industries Inc., based in Los Angeles. On October 12, 1968, Caroll denied a report that the Landmark would be leased to Royal Inns of America, Inc. and operated without a casino. At the time, negotiations were underway with three corporations interested in purchasing the resort.

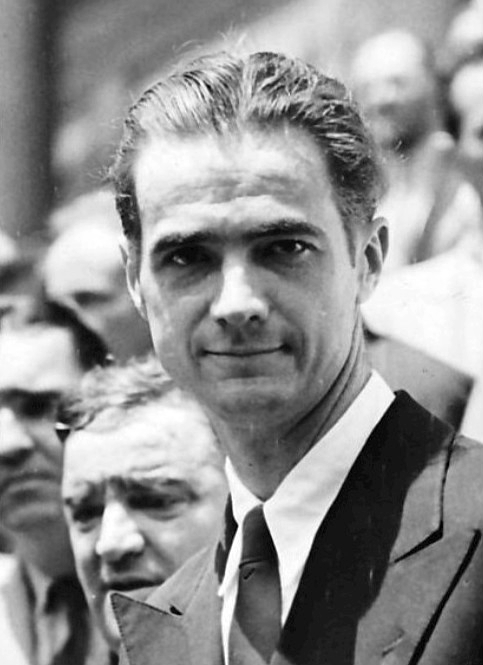
Howard Hughes, pictured in 1938, purchased the Landmark in 1969

On October 23, 1968, billionaire Howard Hughes reached an agreement to purchase the Landmark through Hughes Tool Company for $17.3 million, after denying reports earlier in the year that he was interested in purchasing the project. As part of the sale agreement, Hughes' Hotel Properties, Inc. would accept responsibility for approximately $8.9 million owed to the Teamster Union, as well as approximately $5.9 million in other debts and a balance of $2.4 million to Plaza Tower, Inc. At the time of the agreement, Hughes also owned five other hotel-casinos in Las Vegas. The United States Department of Justice launched an antitrust investigation into Hughes' proposed purchase, after previously investigating his attempt to purchase the Stardust Resort and Casino. As part of the investigation, the Department of Justice tried to determine whether there were other prospective buyers for the Landmark. By December 1968, negotiations were underway with several interested firms, including a $20 million offer from Tanger Industries, a holding company based in El Monte, California.

==== Hughes purchase and opening preparations ====
On January 17, 1969, the Department of Justice approved Hughes' plan to purchase the Landmark as his sixth Las Vegas resort. Later that month, a $1.5 million lawsuit was filed against Hughes Tool Company by Pennsylvania resident James U. Meiler and New York brokerage firm John R. Roake and Son, Inc. Meiler and the brokerage firm stated that they were entitled to a $500,000 brokerage fee for previously arranging a sale of the Landmark to Republic Investors Holding Company, before Hughes Tool Company agreed to purchase it. The lawsuit alleged that Hughes Tool Company "purposely and intentionally caused a restraining of interstate commerce".

At the end of January 1969, Hughes spokesmen stated that some construction on the resort was never finished; that some maintenance systems had not yet been installed; and that some repairs were needed. Hughes also planned to have some of the hotel rooms refurbished. Because of the additional work, the resort was not expected to open until at least July 1, 1969. Approximately 1,000 to 1,100 people were expected to be employed at the Landmark. The Landmark was the only casino that Hughes had taken over before it was opened. As a result, Hughes was heavily involved in details regarding the project. Hughes spent approximately $3 million to give the interior a lavish design and to add other touches to the resort, while the exterior of the Landmark buildings was left unchanged.

In March 1969, Hughes applied for approval to operate the Landmark's gambling operations, with a tentative opening date of July 1, 1969. Hughes planned to operate the casino through his Nevada company, Hughes Properties Inc., which was overseen by Hughes executive Edward H. Nigro. Hughes planned for the resort to include 26 table games and 401 slot machines. Hughes' purchase of the Landmark was not complete at that time, and his representatives stated that the sale would not be completed unless gambling and liquor licenses were issued by the state. In April 1969, Hughes received approval from the Gaming Control Board and from the state.

Hughes planned to personally oversee planning for the Landmark's grand opening; Robert Maheu, who had worked for Hughes since the 1950s, said "I knew from that point on that I was in trouble. He was completely incapable of making decisions." Hughes and Maheu never met each other in person due to Hughes' reclusive lifestyle. Instead, they communicated by telephone and through written messages. For months, they had intense arguments regarding the Landmark's opening date. Maheu believed the Landmark should open on July 1, 1969, but Hughes did not want to commit to an exact date for various reasons. Across the street from the Landmark, Kirk Kerkorian was planning to open his International Hotel on July 2, 1969. Hughes had wanted the Landmark's grand opening event to be better than Kerkorian's, but was concerned that the opening night would not go as planned. Hughes also did not want the opening date to be publicly announced too soon in the event that it should be delayed; Hughes wrote to Maheu: "With my reputation for unreliability in the keeping of engagements, I dont [sic] want this event announced until the date is absolutely firmly established."

Additionally, Hughes wrote to Maheu: "I would hate to see the Landmark open on the 1st of July and then watch the International open a few days later and make the Landmark opening look like small potatoes by comparison." Maheu became concerned, as it was difficult to plan the grand opening without knowing the date. As the tentative opening date approached, Hughes became concerned about other events scheduled for July 1969 – such as the Apollo 11 Moon landing – which might distract from the publicity of the Landmark's opening. By mid-June 1969, Hughes had still not given a definite opening date, which was still tentatively scheduled for July 1, although Hughes had wanted the Landmark to open sometime after the International Hotel. Weeks before the tentative opening, Hughes obsessively made repeated changes to the guest list for the resort's opening night. Regarding who should be invited, Hughes had complex specifications for Maheu to follow. Maheu ultimately had to decide the guest list himself.

On June 16, 1969, Sun Realty filed a claim against Plaza Tower, Inc., thus delaying Hughes' purchase of the Landmark and threatening its planned opening. Sun Realty alleged that it was owed a $500,000 finder's fee for locating Hughes as a buyer. The case was dismissed on June 25, 1969. On June 30, 1969, Sun Realty appealed the decision but was denied that day as it was unable to post a bond that would pay the $5.8 million worth of claims, filed by approximately 120 other creditors after Plaza Towers Inc. entered bankruptcy. Hughes' $17.3 million acquisition of the Landmark, through Hughes Tool Company, was completed on July 1, 1969, a day after Hughes issued checks to three different entities to complete the purchase: $2.5 million to Plaza Towers; $5.8 million to fully pay unsecured creditors; and $9 million to pay off the Teamsters Union.

=== Opening and operation (1969–1990) ===
The Landmark opened on the night of July 1, 1969, a day before the International Hotel. The resort was first unveiled to 480 VIP guests prior to the public opening, which was scheduled for after 9:00 p.m. Apollo 10 astronauts Thomas P. Stafford and Eugene Cernan attended the grand opening, and were the first people to enter the new resort. Other guests included Cary Grant, Dean Martin, Jimmy Webb, Phil Harris, Tony Bennett, Sammy Cahn, Steve and Eydie, and Wilt Chamberlain. Nevada governor Paul Laxalt, as well as senators Alan Bible and Howard Cannon, were also at the opening. Three members of the Los Angeles Rams were also in attendance: Jack Snow, Lamar Lundy, and Roger Brown.

The opening was described by the Las Vegas Sun as resembling a Hollywood premiere. A closed-circuit television camera filmed the festivities in the Landmark on opening night, with the footage being shown live to guests at Hughes' other hotels, the Sands and the Frontier. Hughes – who lived in a secluded penthouse at his nearby Desert Inn hotel-casino – did not attend the grand opening. For opening night, comedian Danny Thomas was the first to perform in the Landmark's theater-restaurant showroom. Hughes had earlier suggested a Rat Pack reunion or a Bob Hope-Bing Crosby reunion as the opening act, both of which were considered unlikely to happen.

Television advertisements for the resort stated: "In France, it's the Eiffel Tower. In India, it's the Taj Mahal. In Las Vegas, it's the Landmark." Dick Parker, executive vice president for the Landmark, had stated during the previous year that the International and the nearby Las Vegas Convention Center would not harm the Landmark's business. The Landmark reportedly lost $5 million in its first week of operations, and despite its close proximity to the convention center, the resort failed to make a profit during the subsequent years of its operation. In October 1969, Sun Realty filed a damages lawsuit against Hughes Tool Company and Plaza Tower, Inc, alleging that the two companies conspired to avoid paying the realty company its $500,000 finder's fee. Aside from the finder's fee, Sun Realty also sought an additional $5 million in punitive damages. In February 1971, the Nevada supreme court rejected the lawsuit, which had sought $3 million by that time. In December 1971, Hughes paid a little over $1 million to purchase 9.86 acres (3.99 ha) of adjacent land located west of the Landmark. Hughes had previously leased the property, which he had been using as a parking lot for the resort.

In January 1973, ownership of the Landmark was transferred to Hughes' Summa Corporation, formerly Hughes Tool Company. That year, the Landmark was valued at $25 million in a property appraisal. By 1974, William Bennett and William Pennington made an offer to buy the Landmark, but Hughes raised the price several times, from $15 million to $20 million; they bought the Circus Circus resort instead. In January 1976, the Landmark began offering foreign-language gaming video tapes to its German, Japanese, and Spanish hotel guests, who frequently limited themselves to playing slot machines rather than table games because of language barriers. Summa general manager E. H. Milligan said, "As far as we know, we are the first hotel in Las Vegas to present this service in this manner." The hotel and casino briefly closed in March 1976, as part of a hotel worker strike consisting of nearly 25,000 employees, affecting 15 Las Vegas resorts. The strike lasted two weeks before ending in late March. Hughes died of kidney failure the following month.

By May 1977, Summa was financially struggling; that month, the brokerage firm of Merrill, Lynch, Pierce, Fenner & Smith recommended that Summa sell its various holdings, including the Landmark. According to the brokerage firm, the Landmark "has proven highly inefficient for hotel/casino operations and, in the opinion of Summa Corporation's management, does not warrant further investment."

==== Gas leak and fire ====
On July 15, 1977, shortly after 4:00 a.m., a water pipe burst in the tower's subbasement, two floors below ground level. Two feet of water flooded the basement room and shorted out the main power panel, thereby cutting out electricity for the resort shortly before 5:00 a.m. An auxiliary power generator provided lighting for the resort. However, telephones, air conditioning, and four of the tower's five elevators were left non-functional because of the main power failure. Carbon monoxide, freon and methane, all originating from the auxiliary generator, infiltrated the tower through ventilation ducts, forcing an evacuation of the building. Between 9:00 a.m. and 11:00 a.m., crews from the Southwest Gas Corporation inspected the building with firemen and found no further traces of gas, allowing guests and employees to re-enter the building.

A second evacuation was ordered at 2:30 p.m. after another power failure, which rendered the elevators inoperable once again. During the outage, 21 table games remained open with the use of emergency lights, while a bar gave away free drinks. Power was restored at 6:45 p.m., although telephones remained inoperable. Guests were given the option to stay at one of Summa's other hotel properties. Despite the incident, hotel executives stated that the resort maintained 95-percent occupancy. An investigation into the cause of the gas leaks could not begin that day due to the presence of fumes in the basement.

During the incident, a news reporter and a cameraman for the local KLAS-TV news channel – also owned by Summa – were beaten and forced out of the hotel lobby by Landmark guards who were armed with clubs and flashlights. Damaged in the altercation was the recording unit for a $37,000 camera owned by KLAS. Other local news crews were allowed to stay at the property to cover the incident. Orders to remove KLAS were given to the guards by hotel management, which had been irritated by recent KLAS news stories that related to Summa's properties, including a story stating that negotiations were underway to sell the Landmark to an Arabian investor.

A total of 138 people were hospitalized after inhaling the poisonous gases; they were treated at four local hospitals. Among the hospitalized were nearly 100 hotel guests, and several firemen and ambulance drivers; most of the patients were released from the hospitals within three days of the incident. A 55-year-old man was the sole casualty in the incident. An investigation into the cause of the gas leaks concluded on July 19, 1977, and found that a defective exhaust line on one of the emergency generators was responsible. The line had been installed during the hotel's construction. John Pisciotta, director of the Clark County Building Department, did not believe that he or anyone else would be able to determine how the line became damaged. Summa brought in the company which installed the system to have it repaired.

On October 23, 1977, at 3:44 p.m., a two-alarm fire was reported in a hotel room on the 22nd floor, after a bartender in the 27th floor lounge smelled smoke. The entire room had caught on fire from a cigarette. The fire was extinguished with help from 45 firefighters, who put it out within five minutes of their arrival. However, the fire led to heavy smoke infiltrating the entire hotel and ground-floor through elevator shafts. The Landmark was evacuated, and hundreds of guests and employees were allowed to return inside at approximately 5:15 p.m., after smoke had been cleared from the resort's interior. The 22nd through 27th floors had moderate smoke damage. Five hotel guests were treated for smoke inhalation, but none required hospitalization.

==== Prospective buyers ====
During October 1977, Summa was in negotiations with several prospective buyers for the Landmark, which had approximately 1,200 employees at the time. One interested buyer was a group of Chicago investors led by an attorney. Summa was also in negotiations to sell the Landmark for $12 million to Nick Lardakis, a tavern owner who lived in Akron, Ohio. Simultaneously, Summa was holding discussions with the Scott Corporation – a group of downtown Las Vegas entrepreneurs led by Frank Scott – which wanted to purchase the resort at a price of nearly $10 million. Lardakis' acquisition of the Landmark was rejected that month as he was unable to raise the necessary funds to make the purchase; according to Summa, Lardakis' terms were "unrealistic." The Chicago group made a $12 million offer, but Summa's board of directors favored the offer by Scott Corporation, which had no down payment and included a 20-year payout period, while the Chicago group was opposed to a long-term mortgage arrangement with Summa. The Chicago group noted that Summa officials repeatedly declined to let the group examine the Landmark's 1973 property appraisal. Other $12 million offers came from Las Vegas heiress JoAnn Seigal and Beverly Hills management consultant Charles Fink. Seigal also complained that Summa would not provide her with a property appraisal to base her negotiations.

The Beverly Hills-based Acro Management Consultants offered $16 million for the Landmark, the highest of five bids up to that time. Summa spokesman Fred Lewis said that Acro's bid was considered "more of an inquiry" than a serious offer, a belief that was disputed by Leonard Gale, vice president of Acro. Gale acknowledged that the Landmark was "the biggest lemon in Las Vegas", but was confident it could become a successful property under Acro's ownership. After weeks of negotiations, Summa announced that no decision had been made on a sale of the Landmark, reportedly due to disagreements within the company. William Lummis, a cousin of Hughes, had been named chairman of the Summa board earlier in the year. Lummis wanted to sell all of Summa's non-profitable properties, while chief operating officer Frank William Gay, citing the purported desires of Hughes, wanted to expand and modernize such properties. The Landmark was considered the weakest of Summa's six gaming and hotel properties in Nevada, as it had never made a profit up to that time.

Summa officials held a meeting on November 3, 1977, but the company made no decision on selling the Landmark, which lost an average of $500,000 per month. By that time, the Scott Corporation stated that it would likely withdraw its offer to purchase the Landmark because of inability to obtain long-term financing. In January 1978, Summa announced that the Landmark would be sold to the Scott Corporation, with the sale price reportedly ranging between $10 million and $12 million. Up to that time, the resort had reportedly lost $15 million since its opening, despite numerous attempts to increase business. Experts believed that the Landmark suffered financially as a result of its low room-count (486 guest rooms at the time) and its location across the street from the Las Vegas Hilton (formerly the International), which was the world's largest hotel at the time. Frank Scott owned downtown Las Vegas' Union Plaza Hotel, which had become one of the city's most successful casinos, and he said the same management principles used at the Union Plaza would be applied to the Landmark.

Gambling is a business—a very unique business—and sound policies applied and followed will result in a successful operation. We face a strong challenge in making the Landmark one of the truly fine casino-hotel operations in Las Vegas, and we look forward to accomplishing this goal.

— Frank Scott, 1978

Scott intended to change the name of the resort, with "The Plaza Tower" as the favorite among several names under consideration. Scott planned to take over operations once the sale received approval from Summa, county and state gaming officials, and courts that were handling Hughes' estate. Because higher offers were subsequently made for the Landmark, the Scott Corporation's offer was rejected by a judge who was monitoring the Hughes estate.

==== Wolfram/Tickel ownership ====
A group of midwestern investors purchased the Landmark from the Summa Corporation in February 1978, at a cost of $12.5 million. The group was led by Lou Tickel and Zula Wolfram, and it included Gary Yelverton. The purchase was financed using money that Wolfram's husband, Ed Wolfram, embezzled from his brokerage firm, Bell & Beckwith. Faye Todd, the Landmark's entertainment director and a corporate executive assistant, primarily oversaw the Landmark's operations for the Wolframs, who lived in Ohio. The Wolframs were high rollers who frequently stayed at the Desert Inn resort when visiting Las Vegas. Todd met the Wolframs while working for the Desert Inn as special events coordinator, and she became close friends with Zula Wolfram, who had been planning to purchase a Las Vegas hotel with her husband. Tickel, a former magistrate judge and a resident of Salina, Kansas, previously owned several other hotels. The group was confident that the Landmark would overcome its financial problems, and they planned to add a 750-room hotel tower to the property within two years.

The sale was completed on March 31, 1978, under the new ownership of Zula Wofram, and Lou and Jo Ann Tickel. However, the new owners were unable to find someone with a gaming license and sufficient funds to continue operating the casino ahead of the sale's completion. The investment group had yet to apply for gaming and liquor licenses, and the Summa Corporation declined to continue operating the casino, citing a lack of interest. The Landmark's casino, which had 272 employees, was closed on April 1, 1978, due to the lack of gaming licenses. The owners began a search for a suitable licensed individual who could temporarily operate the casino until they could receive their own gaming license. The hotel, restaurants, and shops remained open, with 700 other employees. The casino reopened on June 2, 1978, after a one-year gaming license had been granted to Frank Modica, a Las Vegas gaming figure who would temporarily operate the casino on the owners' behalf. The casino's bingo parlor remained closed as it was undergoing renovations.

In October 1978, Tickel, Wolfram, and Yelverton were approved by the state to be licensed as the landlords of the Landmark. At the time, Ed Wolfram was listed as a financial adviser on the licensing plan. In 1979, Jesse Jackson Jr. was the Landmark hotel manager, and was the only such manager in the Las Vegas hotel industry to be black. The Tickels remained as co-owners of the Landmark until 1980, following Zula Wolfram's approval to purchase their interest in the resort. In 1982, architect Martin Stern Jr. was hired to design a large expansion of the Landmark. Revenue for the Landmark exceeded $26 million that year, although the resort lost $500,000 during the month of November 1982. Up to that time, the Landmark had lost an average of $3 million every year since its opening.

Federal investigators shut down Wolfram's firm on February 7, 1983, after they discovered $36 million of money missing in six accounts that were managed by him and his wife, ultimately leading to the discovery of his embezzlement. Lawyer Patrick McGraw, trustee for Bell & Beckwith, was approved later that month to operate the Landmark until it could be liquidated. The expansion designed by Stern was cancelled, and Ed Wolfram was convicted of embezzling later that year, after admitting to using money from his firm to pay for various businesses ventures, with the Landmark being the most expensive. Zula Wolfram, who had owed $5 million to Summa since her purchase of the Landmark, was forced to sell her majority share in the resort.

==== Morris ownership ====
The Landmark was entangled in a Toledo bankruptcy court in July 1983, at which point Bill Morris, a Las Vegas lawyer, made plans to purchase the resort. Morris, also a member of the Las Vegas Convention and Visitors Authority (LVCVA), had previously owned the Holiday Inn Center Strip hotel-casino, as well as the Riverside Resort in nearby Laughlin. Morris had also previously represented Plaza Tower, Inc. at the time that Hughes completed his purchase of the resort. Morris intended to eventually expand the resort to 1,100 hotel rooms.

Yelverton and his wife stated that they had been sold a five-percent interest in the Landmark in 1979, but that the document was never filed with the county recorder's office. In August 1983, the Yelvertons filed a state suit to prevent the sale to Morris, stating that they would not be compensated for their interest if the sale proceeded. At the time, Gary Yelverton was the Landmark's casino manager. The Nevada Gaming Control Board delayed approval of Morris' purchase until his offer could be updated to include what Zula Wolfram owed to Summa. Morris purchased the Landmark for $18.7 million, and took over ownership on October 30, 1983. The struggling resort had a profitable first month under its new management. Morris worked 18 hours a day to ensure the Landmark's success. He said the Landmark had "never really been given a fair chance," citing the absence of "on-hands management on a day-in, day-out basis" as one reason for its lack of success. Morris also believed that previous operators tried to make the Landmark "do something it was not meant to do" by competing with "superstar productions," whereas he believed the resort's location made it more ideal for serving attendees of the Las Vegas Convention Center.

The Landmark remained open while Morris spent nearly $3.5 million on a renovation, which was underway in late 1983. Morris said the Landmark would compete against rivals with its "budget prices and good service." He intended to capitalize on the resort's location with a planned expansion that would feature three 15-story towers with 1,500 hotel rooms, accompanied by a large domed family entertainment center. The expansion was to be built west of the Landmark on 11 acres (4.5 ha) of vacant land that Morris had purchased along with the resort. The expansion did not occur, and the Landmark struggled throughout the 1980s.

By the middle of 1985, Morris was negotiating a $28 million loan to pay for improvements and fire safety updates for the Landmark. Clark County officials considered taking action against the resort because of its failed compliance with fire safety standards. On July 29, 1985, the Internal Revenue Service (IRS) filed a $2.1 million lien against the property, because of Morris' failure to pay withholding and payroll taxes for the resort's employees for the previous six months. Two days after the lien was filed, the Landmark filed for Chapter 11 bankruptcy to prevent the IRS from seizing assets such as casino cage money. The resort remained open despite the bankruptcy filing, and the casino had enough money to remain operational. The Landmark had debts totaling $30.6 million, while it had $30.6 million in assets. Morris blamed the bankruptcy on McGraw, alleging that he derailed a $28.8 million refinancing of the Landmark 24 hours prior to the finalization of the loan. Morris said operations would continue as normal despite the bankruptcy filing.

The Nevada National Bank requested in early 1986 that the bankruptcy be converted to a liquidation proceeding to pay off creditors, stating that the Landmark's bankruptcy reorganization plan could not succeed. Morris said he would have to cancel his reorganization plan and lay off 700 to 800 Landmark employees if a bankruptcy court did not allow the resort to abandon its union labor contracts. Part of Morris' reorganization plan involved cutting employee wages by 15 percent, including his own yearly salary of $145,000. The pay cut would give the Landmark an additional $6,500 per month, which would allow the resort to make its mortgage payments. Morris hoped to increase the hotel's room count after the resort's eventual emergence from bankruptcy, with additional financing from a national franchise hotel chain. He hoped that the Landmark would be out of Chapter 11 bankruptcy by March 1, 1986, although it would ultimately remain in bankruptcy for the rest of its operation.

In January 1987, a small fire broke out in the resort's showroom, located next to the casino. Five employees were evacuated, and there were no injuries. Customers in the casino were unaware of the fire, which was quickly extinguished by the local fire department. The fire was determined to have likely been caused by an arsonist. In July 1987, the Landmark began offering poker tournaments in its Nightcap Lounge each weekday night. To help bring in customers, two cash drawings were held during each tournament.

Morris and bank company Drexel Burnham Lambert began a search in 1989 for a new owner to take over the Landmark. At the end of the year, a U.S. bankruptcy court judge gave Morris until 1990 to find a buyer or refinancing. Otherwise, the Landmark would be liquidated to pay off creditors, in accordance with a court order. On January 2, 1990, the Landmark was ordered into Chapter 7 bankruptcy after a judge ruled that the creditors would not be able to receive compensation under the reorganization plan. Between $43 million and $46 million was owed to various creditors. Morris' gaming license expired that month after the resort failed to pay $500,000 in taxes and penalties. Richard Davis, a Las Vegas-based real estate agent, was appointed by the bankruptcy court that month to temporarily operate the resort. On February 21, 1990, the Nevada Gaming Commission extended the gaming license and allowed the resort to stay open for at least two additional weeks while its financial problems were analyzed by state experts. At that time, the hotel had $562,000 in cash, including $175,000 in revenue that had accumulated in the prior six weeks.

The Landmark continued to struggle, although the introduction of various casino programs helped improve revenue. A U.S. bankruptcy court judge approved a request for the Landmark to be sold seven weeks later in a public auction scheduled for August 6, 1990. The request was made by Davis, who cited numerous failed attempts to sell the resort. More than 200 prospective buyers had inquired about the Landmark, but only five to ten of them were considered as having serious interest in the resort. In July 1990, two Denver businessmen, David M. Droubay and Martin Heckmaster, offered $35.5 million to purchase the bankrupt resort. Morris was dissatisfied with the offer, stating that the property had been appraised as high as $70 million.

=== Closure (1990–1995) ===
On August 6, 1990, the bankruptcy hearing failed to attract a buyer for the Landmark. Ralph Engelstad and Charles Frias, who both held substantial interest in the resort, had made $100,000 deposits which allowed them to bid at the hearing, but they did not do so and left the hearing without commenting. Droubay and Heckmaster were ineligible to bid as they did not make a deposit. At the request of Davis' attorney, a U.S. bankruptcy judge granted permission to close the Landmark. Gaming operations began shutting down that afternoon, within an hour of the failed hearing. Slot machine and hotel operations were scheduled to shut down later in the week. With 498 rooms at the time, the Landmark was unable to compete with new megaresorts, and was fully closed on August 8, 1990.

Morris, upset about the failed auction, said, "Sometimes it comes down to good luck and bad luck. I had nothing but bad luck. Someone is going to come in and run the Landmark and look like a genius." Forrest Woodward, who managed the casino for Davis, said, "This is just an obsolete gaming property that no one's interested in, considering the debt," which included $48 million; a portion of that was $10 million in unsecured claims. Davis' attorney predicted the Landmark would be closed for 100 days or more while creditors pursued a foreclosure sale. A week after the closure, Davis received permission from the U.S. bankruptcy court to abandon the property as trustee, due to the cost of maintaining security at the closed resort. Davis' attorney said it would cost between $60,000 and $200,000 each month to maintain the property. Creditors would be left to pay bills relating to the property until a foreclosure sale could take place. In December 1990, the property was purchased through a foreclosure sale by Lloyds Bank of London for $20 million. Lloyds Bank made the purchase in order to protect a $25 million loan it had made to Morris in 1988. By March 1993, the Landmark's contents had been liquidated through a sale conducted by National Content Liquidators.

By July 1993, representatives of Lloyds Bank had approached the LVCVA about the possibility of purchasing the Landmark. LVCVA was interested in the proposal, with plans to use the Landmark's 21-acre property either for a parking lot or expansion. LVCVA purchased the Landmark in September 1993, at a cost of $15.1 million. During 1994, board members of LVCVA debated on whether to restore the Landmark or demolish it, ultimately deciding on the latter. Only three LVCVA board members voted to save the building. Among those voting in support was Lorraine Hunt, who later said that the Landmark "was iconic and part of the history of Las Vegas. Had they kept it, it could have been the office for the Las Vegas Convention and Visitors Authority."

==== Demolition ====
LVCVA paid $800,000 for asbestos removal in the tower. Central Environmental Inc. was hired to remove the asbestos, while AB-Haz Environmental, Inc. was the asbestos removal consultant. In mid-1994, AB-Haz Environmental began removing asbestos insulation from the Landmark. The removal, scheduled for completion in August 1994, took nearly six months. In October 1994, it was announced that the Landmark would be demolished the following month to make way for a 21-acre parking lot, to be used by the Las Vegas Convention Center. Demolition of the tower was delayed several times, to allow for the removal of additional asbestos. The Clark County Health District proposed penalties against the asbestos companies.

By February 1995, AB-Haz had twice declared the Landmark to be asbestos-free and safe for demolition, although Clark County officials discovered that some hotel floors still contained 90 percent of the asbestos. Up to that time, LVCVA had already paid a total of $1 million to the asbestos companies to have the asbestos removed from the hotel and an adjacent apartment complex, allowing for their demolition. The Clark County Air Pollution Control Division recommended a $450,000 fine against AB-Haz for failure to remove the asbestos, while LVCVA would have to spend an additional $1 million for further asbestos removal. AB-Haz was ultimately cited for violating air emission standards during the asbestos removal, and signed a settlement in which the company agreed to pay an $18,000 fine. Central Environmental was removing asbestos from the tower as of August 1995. Because of previous delays, officials for LVCVA had given up on setting a demolition date until all the asbestos was removed. In October 1995, LVCVA paid Iconco Inc. $740,000 to remove remaining asbestos from the resort, hoping to have it demolished in time for ConExpo to be held on the property's new parking lot in March 1996.

Controlled Demolition, Inc. (CDI) was hired to implode the tower. No blueprints could be found for the tower, which CDI president Mark Loizeaux considered unusual. Demolition crews discovered secret stairwells in the tower, and Loizeaux said, "We have learned everything as we have gone in. It was a very strange structure, very unique." A week before the Landmark tower was demolished, crews removed the remaining asbestos from the low-rise structures and subsequently tore them down. Crews then spent the final days of demolition by drilling in the tower to weaken and prepare it ahead of its planned implosion. Less than 100 pounds of dynamite was placed in certain locations throughout the tower's first four floors.

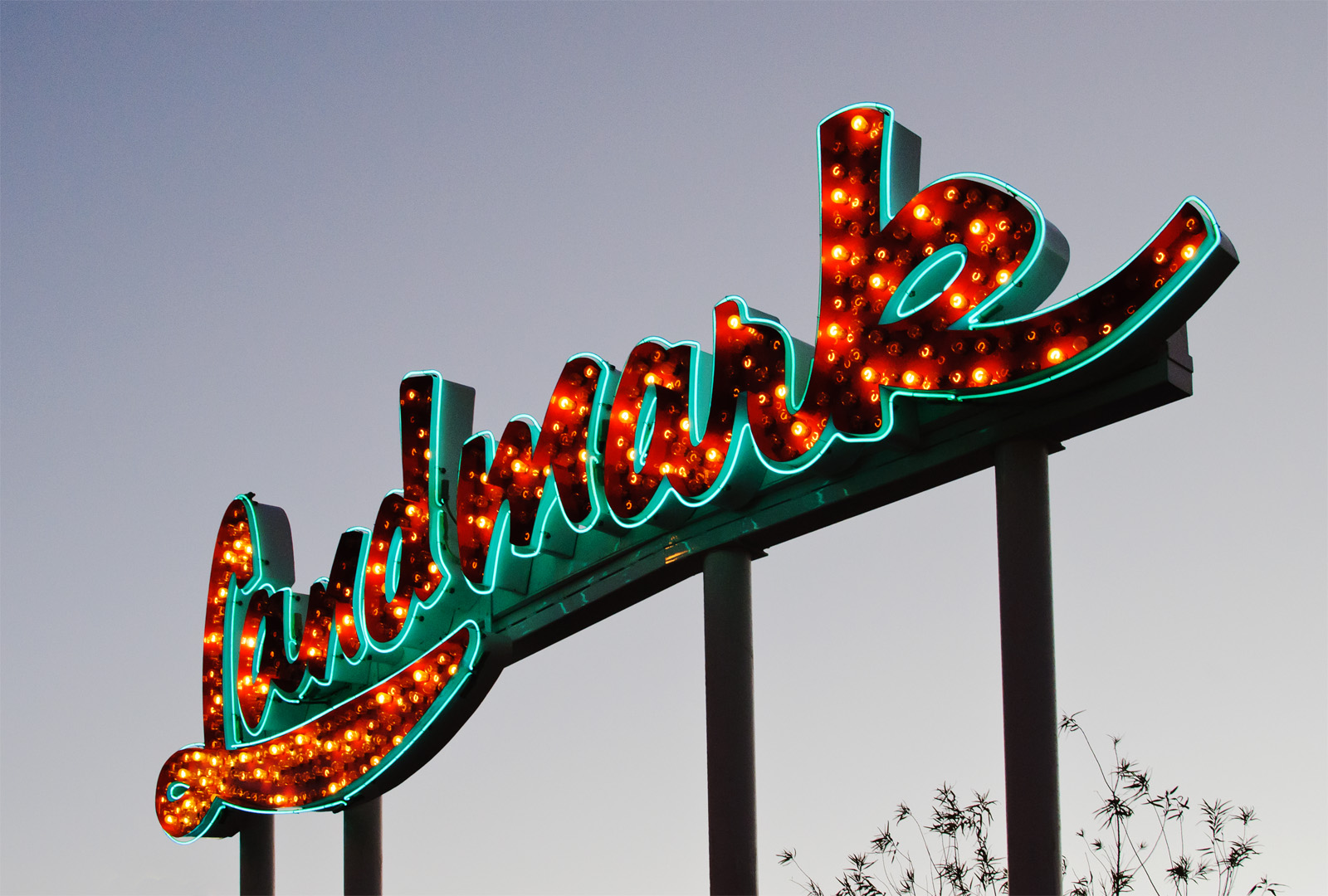
A restored Landmark sign, located on the property of the former resort (2013)

At 5:37 a.m. on November 7, 1995, the Landmark tower was demolished. An estimated 7,000 people arrived to witness the implosion. Its unique structural properties caused the tower to split in half vertically upon detonation; first, the tower's northwest half came down, followed by the second half, which caved in on itself. The implosion was followed by a black cloud of dust ascending 150 feet into the air. Most of the material from the demolished structure was to be recycled and used in other construction projects. The 31-story tower was the tallest reinforced concrete building ever demolished in North America as of 1996, and the second tallest building in the world to be demolished at the time. Demolition and related expenses cost $3 million. Frank Wright, curator of the Nevada State Museum and Historical Society, said "I kind of hate to see it come down," stating that the Landmark tower still represented what the then-upcoming Stratosphere tower represented: "the biggest and the tallest." The property was to become occupied by 2,200 parking spaces, expected to be ready by March 1996.

One of the Landmark's ground-level signs, with gold and blue cursive neon lettering, was restored by the Neon Museum and installed at the parking lot. As of 2017, the property contains 2,948 parking spaces for the Las Vegas Convention Center. In 2019, work was underway on an expansion of the convention center, to be built on the former sites of the Landmark and the nearby Riviera. The sign was removed from the site and temporarily put into storage by the Neon Museum. The convention center's West Hall expansion opened on the site in June 2021.

== Architecture ==
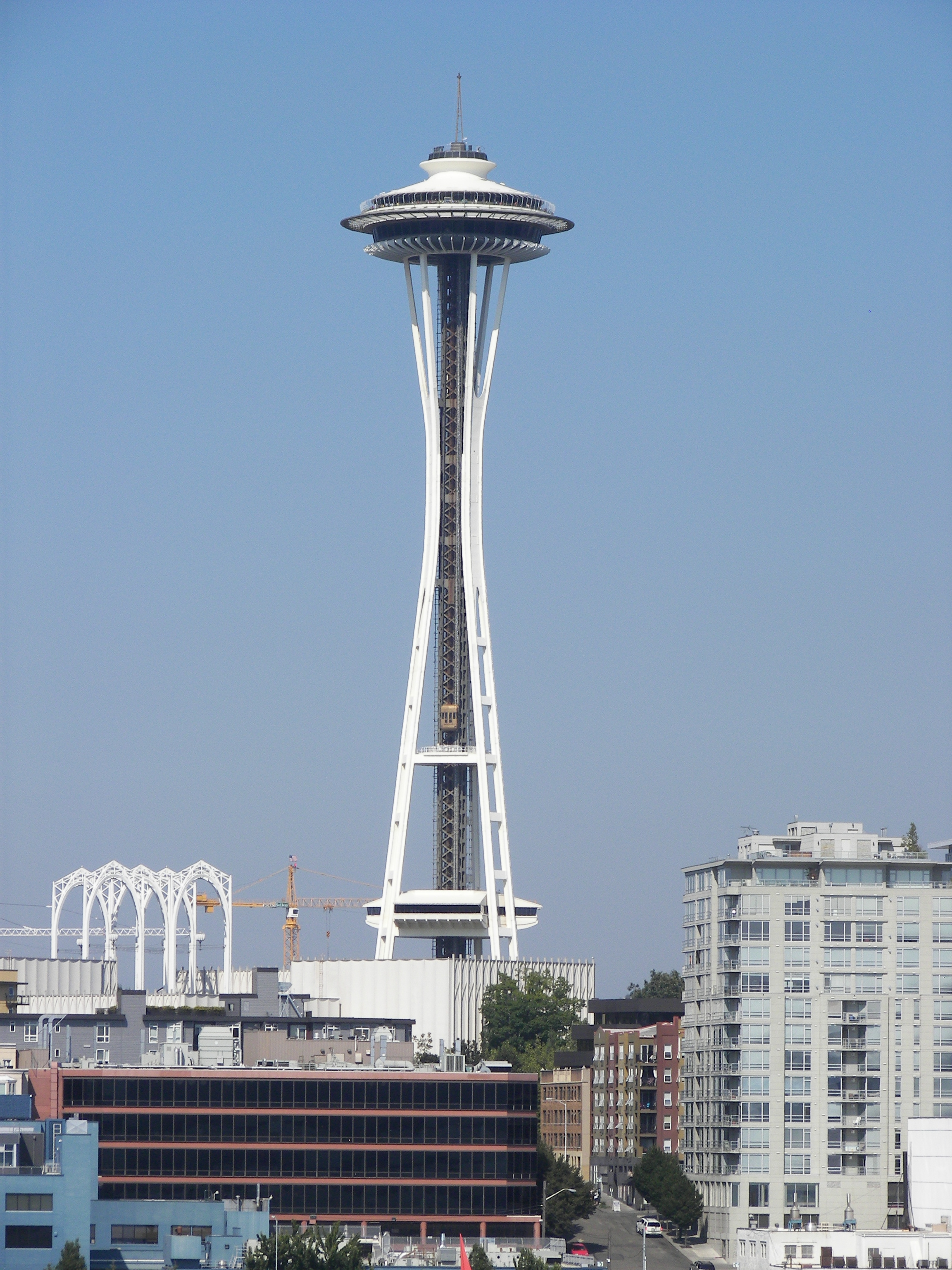
The Landmark's design was inspired by Seattle's Space Needle tower.

The Landmark tower was designed by architects Gerald Moffitt and Ed Hendricks. The uniquely designed Landmark tower was the first of its kind to be built in Nevada; its design was inspired by the Space Needle located in Seattle, Washington. When construction stopped in 1962, the project consisted of 127,614 sq ft (11,855.7 m^{2}) of floor space, and included two basements that were 30 feet deep. The tower's height measured 297 feet, while its diameter measured 60 feet. The tower's dome measured 141 feet in diameter. In 1966 – the year that construction resumed – architects George Tate and Thomas Dobrusky were hired to design new portions of the resort, including the ground-floor casino.

=== Height ===
The Landmark tower was billed as having 31 floors, although it skipped floors 13 and 28. The Landmark tower was the tallest building in the state from 1962 to 1969. In 1967, a revolving letter "L" neon sign was installed at the top of the tower. Excluding its rooftop sign, the tower stood 297 feet (91 m), seven feet taller than the Mint hotel in downtown Las Vegas.

Conflicting numbers have been given for the tower's total height. According to Scherer, the sign measured 40 feet (12 m), and the tower measured 328 feet (100 m), including the sign. At the time of opening, the Landmark tower was billed as having a height of 346 feet (105 m). By that time, the new 30-story International Hotel had become the tallest building in the state at 375 feet (114 m). When it was demolished, the tower reportedly stood 356 feet (109 m). According to Emporis, the tower stood 331.50 feet (101.04 m) from the ground to its roof, while the tip raised the height to a total of 364 feet (111 m).

=== Features ===
When the Landmark opened, it had a total of 400 slot machines. The ground-floor casino was 14,000 sq ft (1,300 m^{2}), while a second casino, consisting of 3,000 sq ft (280 m^{2}), was located in the dome on the 29th floor; it was the first high-rise casino in the state. At the time of opening, the ground-floor casino featured red and black colors, while the upper casino used orange coloring and wood. The hotel contained 476 rooms and 27 suites for a total of 503, a small number in comparison to other Las Vegas resorts, which commonly had 1,000 rooms. The tower included 157 hotel rooms, while the remaining units were located on ground level. The tower used an octagonal floorplan, and the rooms in the tower used a layout that had them shaped like pie slices. By 1977, the room count had increased to 524, before ultimately being lowered to 498 at the time of the Landmark's closure in 1990.

The Landmark's interior designer was Las Vegas resident Leonard Edward England, who designed the ground floor to include a colorful and primitive Incan theme, which gradually changed to a Space Age theme on subsequent floors. The interior included $200,000 light fixtures, glowing, red-colored Incan masks, and a burnished metal wall sculpture representing a Cape Kennedy launch. The interior also included 65 tons of black and white polished marble, and carved mahogany woodwork from Mexico. In addition, the interior featured murals depicting the eight Wonders of the World, which included the Landmark tower.

After Hughes agreed to purchase the resort, he had an island built in the middle of the hotel's 240-foot swimming pool, which cost $200,000 and was the longest in the world. The Landmark's pool included waterfalls and three carpeted bridges leading to its center island, which featured palm trees. For the hotel, Hughes replaced 72-inch beds with 80-inch beds and had color televisions built into the walls of each room ahead of the resort's opening.

The Landmark's second floor was used for offices. The tower's dome included five floors, although floors 26 and 30 were used by employees for maintenance equipment, elevator equipment, and dressing rooms. The shape and strength of the tower's bubble dome was maintained by perlite concrete and steel girders. The Landmark included a high-speed exterior glass elevator, which took people up to the five-story cupola dome. The elevator was located on the tower's west side, facing the Las Vegas Strip. It was capable of moving 1,000 feet per minute, allowing people to go from the ground floor to the 31st floor in 20 seconds. It was the fastest elevator in the Western United States. Hughes biographer Michael Drosnin stated that the elevator was prone to constant malfunctions, and that the Landmark's air-conditioning system "never really worked." The dome provided wraparound views of the city, and was capable of holding over 2,000 people. The dome included lounges and a night club, as well as the high-rise casino on the 29th floor. At the time of the Landmark's opening, the showroom and the Cascade Terrace coffee shop were located on the first floor, while a steak and seafood gourmet restaurant known as Towers Restaurant was located on the 27th floor and a Chinese restaurant known as the Mandarin Room was located on the 29th floor.

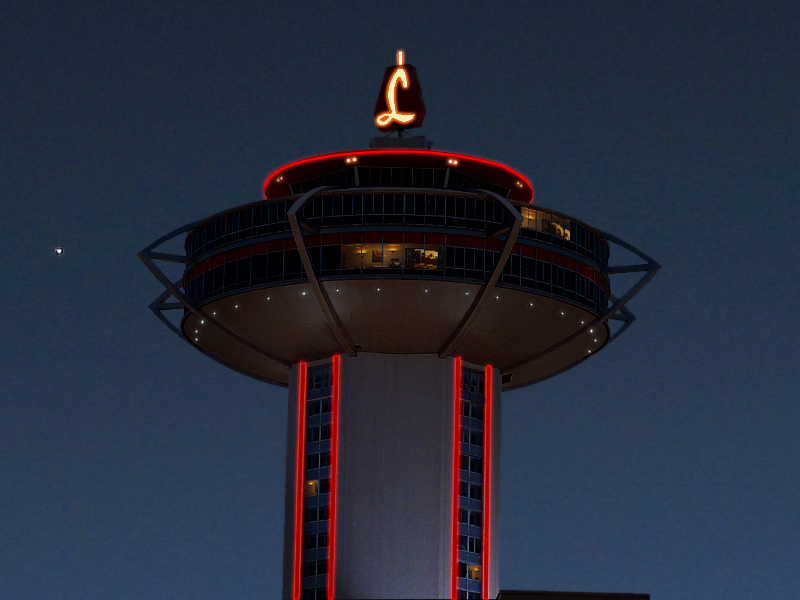
A 1995 photo of the tower, modified to depict its operational appearance in the 1980s

In April 1971, plans were announced for a $750,000 expansion that would include luxury suites on the 29th floor, the highest in Las Vegas at the time. Also planned was the remodeling of the casino and lobby, and the expansion of a coffee shop. The Skytop Rendezvous, a piano bar and dance floor on the top floor of the tower, was reopened as a discotheque on February 3, 1975, specializing in middle of the road music. The Landmark was the only major hotel in the state to have a discotheque. When Morris' renovation began in December 1983, the tower contained 150 rooms, a number that was expected to be reduced as the rooms would be enlarged and upgraded to first class standards. Other plans included changes to the coffee shop, new casino carpeting, and redesigning and renaming the 27th-floor restaurant as Anthony's Seafood and Prime Rib Room. The renovation was financed by Valley Bank of Nevada.

The Love Song Lounge operated on the top floor during the mid-1980s, before and after Morris' renovation, and offered dancing. During 1985 through 1987, the resort also operated the Sunset Room on the 27th floor, offering piano-bar music and fine dining, with an emphasis on steaks and seafood. The Poolside Room operated on the ground level. The Nightcap Lounge opened at the Landmark in 1986, and offered comedy acts.

=== Reception ===
In 1962, the Los Angeles Times called the $6 million Landmark, "By far the most spectacular project", out of several Las Vegas resorts that were under construction; the newspaper further wrote that the Landmark was "destined to become the Mark Hopkins of Las Vegas." The following year, the Reno Evening Gazette opined that the Landmark had "the most unusual exterior architecture in Nevada." In 1966, Billboard wrote that the mushroom-shaped Landmark tower had "the most spectacular design" of all recent high-rise structures in the city. In 1993, architecture critic Alan Hess noted the simplicity of the Landmark and the nearby International Hotel when compared with previous Las Vegas casinos, writing, "As singular, self-contained forms, they showed none of the complexity of the different pieces and sequential additions that made the original Strip visually and urbanistically richer." In 2002, Geoff Carter of Las Vegas Weekly wrote that the demolished Landmark was "Vegas' coolest building and a veritable shrine to 1960s 'Googie' architecture."

== Performances ==
Peggy Lee performed at the Landmark during the year of its opening. In its early years, the Landmark became well known for its performances by country singers, including Kay Starr, Jimmy Dean, Patti Page, Bobbie Gentry, and Danny Davis with his Nashville Brass band, as well as a four-week show starring Ferlin Husky and Archie Campbell. Frank Sinatra also performed at the Landmark, and Bobby Darin made one of his final appearances there. In 1974, the Landmark launched Red McIlvaine's Star Search, a variety show featuring people from across the United States.

The following year, The Jim Halsey Company began Country Music USA, a show at the Landmark that featured a different country music headliner every two to three weeks. The show was usually sold out. Roy Clark and Mel Tillis made their debuts in Country Music USA, as did Freddy Fender. The Oak Ridge Boys made their Las Vegas debut in Country Music USA. Leroy Van Dyke performed in the show, with Fender as his opening act. Van Dyke performed again at the Landmark later in the 1970s, with Sons of the Pioneers as his opening act. Other artists who performed in Country Music USA included Barbara Fairchild, Johnny Paycheck and Tommy Overstreet, as well as Jody Miller, Roy Head, and Hank Thompson. Country Music USA ran for two years, until 1977.

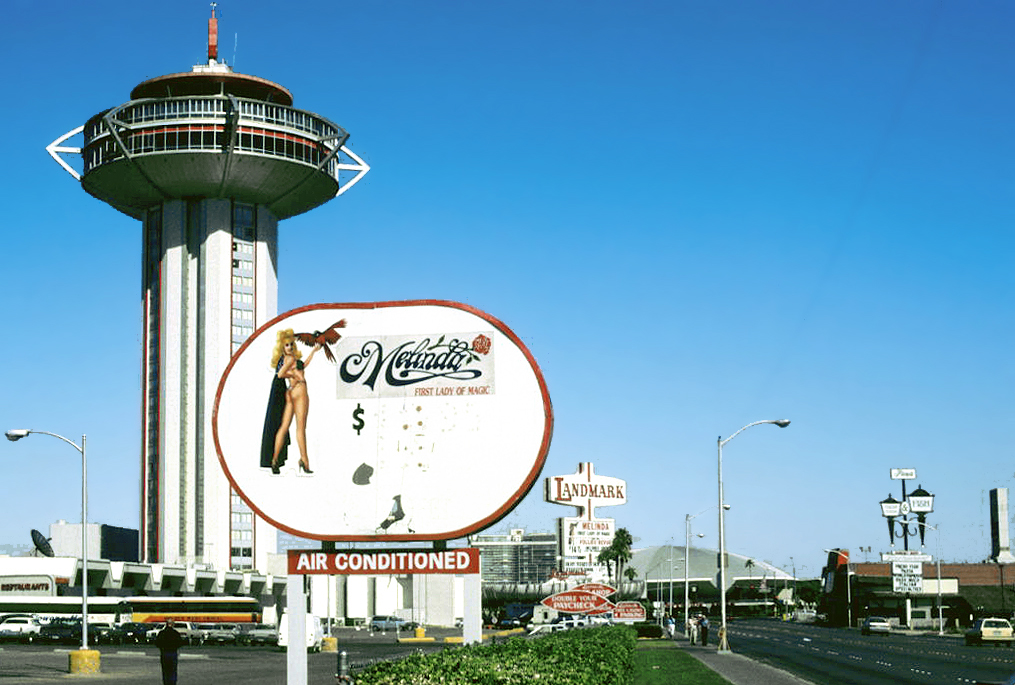
The Landmark in September 1989, advertising magician Melinda Saxe

Spellcaster, an 80-minute family oriented show featuring country-western singer Roy Clayborne, debuted at the Landmark in 1982. Spellcaster, a production show with dancers and showgirls, featured Clayborne singing 15 songs. Spellcaster was named after one of the Wolframs' racing horses, and was produced through Zula Wolfram's Las Vegas production company, Zula Productions. The show was designed and directed by Larry Hart, a 1979 Grammy Award winner, and it ran for approximately eight months. At the time of Spellcaster's debut, Danny Hein and Terri Dancer also began performing in the resort's Galaxy Lounge. Hein and Dancer had four different shows consisting of various costumes and set decorations, and were accompanied by a five-person band of musicians who backed up the duo.

In the late 1980s, the Landmark's showroom hosted minor acts and was considered small in comparison to other Las Vegas resorts. The Landmark hosted magician Melinda Saxe in a family-friendly magic show, which was initially known as '88 Follies Revue and was renamed Follies Revue '89 the following year before concluding its run. In 1990, the main showroom featured Spellbound, a magic show consisting of two illusionist teams. Dick Foster was the show's director and producer.

== In popular culture ==
The unfinished tower briefly appears in the 1964 film, Viva Las Vegas. In 1971, Sean Connery and stuntmen rode atop the Landmark's exterior elevator as part of filming for scenes in the James Bond film Diamonds Are Forever ; the tower was among other Las Vegas resorts that stood in as the fictional Whyte House hotel-casino. In the 1980s, the Landmark appeared in the television series Vega$ and Crime Story. In October 1994, the exterior entrance of the Landmark was lit up for one night so it could be used for outdoor shots as the fictional Tangiers casino, featured in the 1995 film, Casino.

The Landmark's implosion was filmed for use in director Tim Burton's 1996 film, Mars Attacks! In the film, the Landmark is portrayed as the fictional Galaxy Hotel, which is destroyed by an alien spaceship. Burton had stayed at the hotel a few times and was upset by the decision to demolish it, so he wanted to immortalize it in his film. A scale model of the Landmark tower was also made for the production of Mars Attacks! The demolition of the Landmark also appears during the closing credits of the 2003 film, The Cooler. The Lucky 38, a fictional tower casino featured in the 2010 video game Fallout: New Vegas, partially resembles the Landmark.

A near-exact replica of the Landmark called the Bikini Atoll Casino can be seen in the Saints Row (2022) reboot, in the El Dorado district (which is based on the Las Vegas Strip) of Santo Ileso. It is portrayed as an abandoned casino.

== See also ==
- Fontainebleau Las Vegas, tallest building in Nevada since 2008; opened in 2023 after a construction delay
- The Strat, still-extant hotel with a similarly-designed tower
