= Ships Coffee Shop =

Defunct coffee shop chain in Los Angeles, California

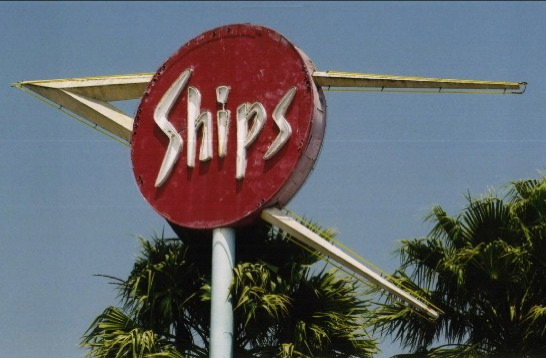
Ship's Coffee Shop sign on Olympic Boulevard

Ships Coffee Shop was a small chain of coffee shops with iconic Modern architecture in Los Angeles, California, United States. The architectural style is classified as Googie Architecture. Ships was especially known for its signage. Martin Stern Jr. was the architect.

The Ships menu included Shrimp Louie, Navy bean soup, Ship Shape Burger, Steak-O-Bob, Chicken Pot Pie and Hot Cake Sandwich. Sunbeam toasters were located at tables and on the counters for customers to prepare their own toast.

There were three Ships locations opened by resterauteur Emmett Shipman and his father Matt Shipman, at Westwood, Culver City and La Cienega. They were open 24 hours, 365 days a year, never closing.

The Westwood (two part) Ships CS/CG (Coffee Shop/Chicken Galley) at Wilshire Boulevard and Glendon Avenue, was the second to open (1958). It closed on September 20, 1984 and was demolished shortly after, to make way for a 20 story office building.

The Ships at La Cienega Boulevard and Olympic Boulevard was the last to open (1963). It closed at 4pm on 30 August 1995, and was later demolished. This was the Ships which featured in the film Into the Night.

The Culver City Ships at Washington Boulevard and Overland Avenue was the first to open (December 1956), and last to close, at 4pm on 31 August 1995, although it re-opened on 20 October (under new management, Matt Shipman) and finally closed on November 25, 1996 (after the lease expired). The building was later occupied by Starbucks, but was remodeled beyond recognition in 2013.

Ships lived on for a few years, through their official website (from 2011), run by 'Mr. Ships' (Matt Shipman) until his death in 2016. The website closed down in December of that year, exactly 60 years after the first Ships Coffee Shop opened for business.

Like the Culver City restaurant, after being closed down, the website was reinstated for just over a year, before closing permanently.

A Ships location (Westwood) can be seen in an overhead shot in the film Koyaanisqatsi at 0:32:34. A five minute scene in Into the Night takes place at the Ships on La Cienega.
