= Architecture Studies Library =

Coordinates: 36.1026°N 115.1387°W

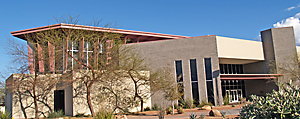
UNLV Architecture Studies Library

The UNLV Architecture Studies Library (ASL) is located in the Paul B. Sogg Architecture Building, located on the University of Nevada, Las Vegas campus. The services of the library address both the needs of the faculty and students of the UNLV School of Architecture, and also offers an email reference service. The Library provides historical and current information and resources about architecture in Las Vegas, primarily through its Las Vegas Architects and Buildings Database.

== History ==
The building was completed and occupied in August 1997. The Architecture Studies Library (approximately 16,000 gross square feet) includes spaces for book and periodical stacks, individual carrels on both of its floors, current periodicals display shelving, exhibits, a reference area, clippings files, special collections, group study rooms, and a computer lab.

The architect for the building was Swisher & Hall Architects of Las Vegas. The interiors furniture selection and placement was a project of one of the school's interior design classes.

== Collections ==
The UNLV ASL provides an archival collection of Nevada AIA design awards spanning over a quarter of a century, in addition to summarized data on architectural projects, firms and individuals both through its in-house collection of materials as well as its online materials.

== Notes and references ==
- 1. Brown, Jeanne. ASL Services. Las Vegas: University of Nevada, Las Vegas Architecture Studies Library. Last updated: May 29, 2007. Accessed May 29, 2007.
- 2. Brown, Jeanne. Architecture Studies Library Building. Las Vegas: University of Nevada, Las Vegas Architecture Studies Library. Last updated: Oct. 18, 2006. Accessed May 31, 2007.
