= Las Vegas Grammar School (Las Vegas Boulevard, Las Vegas, Nevada) =

Coordinates: 36.164704°N 115.142892°W

- U.S. National Register of Historic Places
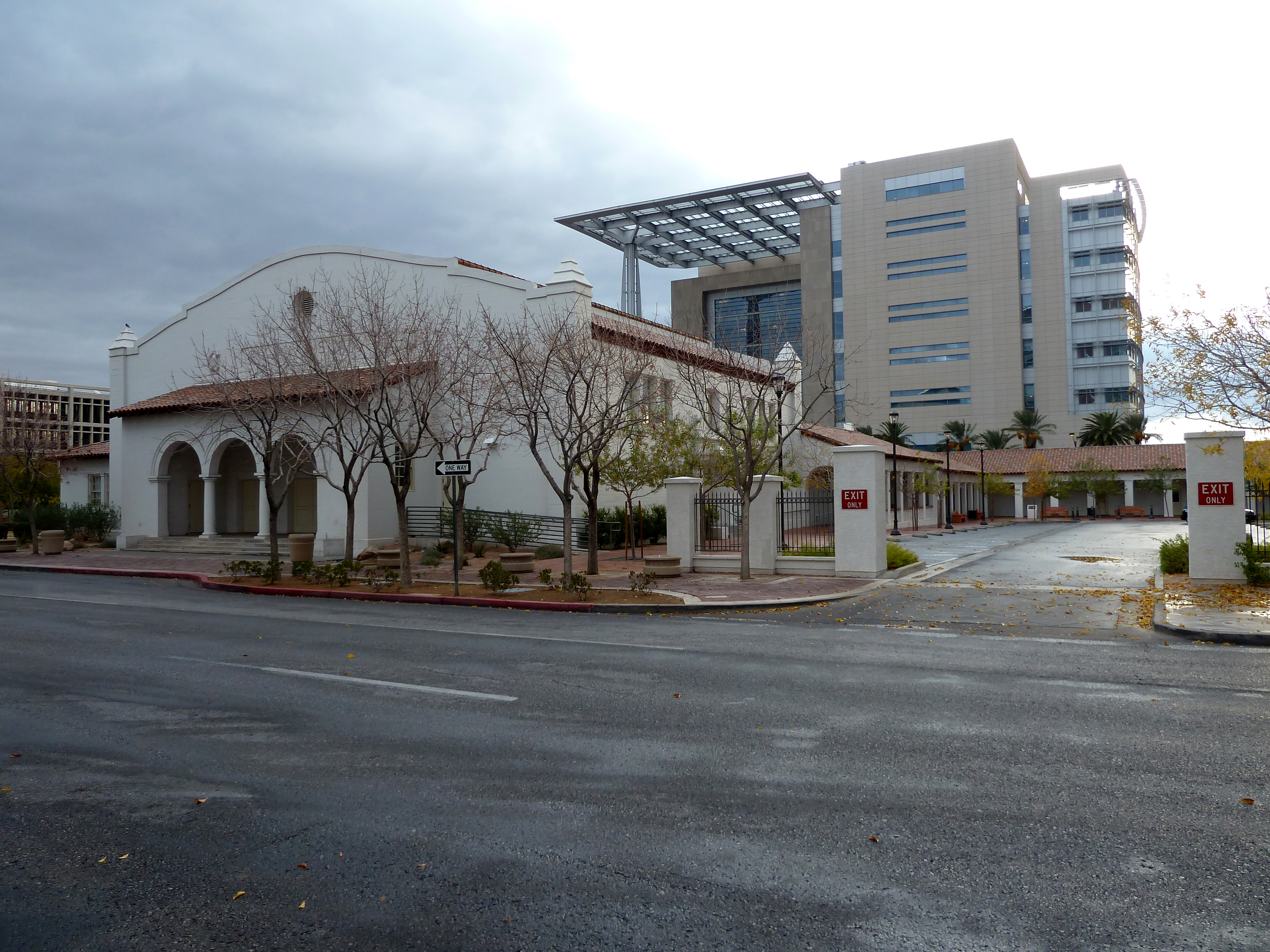
- Location: 401 South Fourth Street; Las Vegas, Nevada
- Built: 1936
- Architect: Orville L. Clark
- Architectural style: Mission; Spanish Revival
- NRHP reference No.: 88000549
- Added to NRHP: May 20, 1988

The Las Vegas Grammar School (also known as the Historic Fifth Street School) is a school listed on the National Register of Historic Places in Las Vegas, Nevada, United States. The school sits on a 20-acre (8.1 ha) site off of Las Vegas Boulevard at 401 South Fourth Street in Downtown Las Vegas.

== History ==
The school was constructed in 1936 to replace the previous Clark County High School (1917–1934) which was destroyed by fire. Opened as “Las Vegas Grammar School” it came to be informally known as Fifth Street School when Las Vegas Blvd was still called Fifth Street. The school was used until 1966.

The building was added to the National Register of Historic Places on May 20, 1988.

The school has undergone an extensive $9.5 million renovation. The interior has been configured to allow its return as an education facility. The school is home to:

- City of Las Vegas - Office of Cultural Affairs
- Nevada School of Arts
- UNLV School of Architecture Downtown Design Center
- Las Vegas chapter of the American Institute of Architects

== Notable alumni ==
- Bill Boyd, businessman and co-founder of Boyd Gaming

== See also ==
- Las Vegas Grammar School (Washington and D Streets, Las Vegas, Nevada), also NRHP-listed
