= Zick & Sharp =

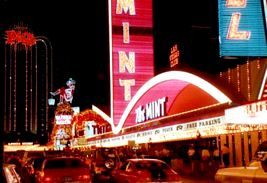
The Mint, Las Vegas, 1957.

Clark High School, Las Vegas, 1965.

Zick & Sharp, officially Walter Zick & Howard Sharp, was an American architectural firm from Las Vegas, Nevada, in business from 1949 to 1980. The partners were Walter Zick and Harris Sharp.

== Partner biographies ==
Walter Frederick Zick was born in New York City on May 2, 1905. He was educated at the University of Southern California, obtaining a Bachelor of Architecture in 1928 and a Master of Education in 1932. By the late 1930s he had established an architect's office in Alhambra, California. In 1945 he joined the office of Richard Stadelman & Associates, of Las Vegas. Stadelman's firm, dealing with the Flamingo project, required a larger office staff, and Zick was hired originally for the year alone. However, he grew to love the valley, and remained for the remainder of his career. He left Stadelman in 1948, establishing a partnership with Harris Sharp in November 1949. Walter Zick was a partner in Zick & Sharp until his retirement in 1980. He died in 1990.

Harris Perry Sharp was born in El Paso, Texas on September 2, 1919. He was educated at the University of Arizona (1937–1938), University of New Mexico (1938–1940), and the University of Southern California, where he received a Bachelor of Architecture in 1943. He worked for L. L. Jone, Kenneth Wayne, and the W. C. Kruger Company. In 1947 he became a partner in the office of Las Vegas architect A. Lacey Worswick, who was formerly the city's leading practitioner. Sharp left Worswick's office in 1949 to partner with Walter Zick. Zick & Sharp remained in business until Zick's retirement in 1980. The office was succeeded by Harris Sharp & Associates.

== Selected works ==
=== Zick & Sharp, 1949-1980 ===
- 1952 – Lomie G. Heard Elementary School, Nellis Air Force Base, Clark County, Nevada
- 1955 – Moulin Rouge Hotel, 900 W Bonanza Rd, Las Vegas, Nevada
  - Demolished in 2010
- 1955 – Twin Lakes Shopping Center, 1048 N Rancho Dr, Las Vegas, Nevada
- 1956 – Maude Frazier Hall, University of Nevada, Las Vegas, Nevada
  - Demolished in 2008
- 1957 – Hyde Park Middle School, Hinson St, Las Vegas, Nevada
- 1957 – The Mint, 100 Fremont St, Las Vegas, Nevada
- 1958 – Capehart Housing, Nellis Air Force Base, Clark County, Nevada
- 1958 – Archie C. Grant Hall, University of Nevada, Las Vegas, Nevada
- 1959 – Boulder City High School, 5th St, Boulder City, Nevada
- 1961 – Clark County Courthouse, 200 S 3rd St, Las Vegas, Nevada
  - With Welton Becket & Associates. Demolished.
- 1965 – E. W. Clark High School, Pennwood Ave, Las Vegas, Nevada
- 1966 – Harry C. Levy Gardens, 2525 W Washington Ave, Las Vegas, Nevada
- 1966 – Valley High School, Burnham Ave, Las Vegas, Nevada
- 1968 – First National Bank of Nevada Building, 302 E Carson Ave, Las Vegas, Nevada
- 1970 – Flora Dungan Humanities Building, University of Nevada, Las Vegas, Nevada
- 1975 – Nevada Savings and Loan Association Building, 201 S Las Vegas Blvd, Las Vegas, Nevada

=== Harris Sharp & Associates, from 1980 ===
- 1981 - B. Mahlon Brown Junior High School, 307 Cannes St, Henderson, Nevada
- 1984 - Nevada Savings Financial Center, 330 W Sahara Ave, Las Vegas, Nevada
