= Martin Stern Jr. =

American architect (1917–2001)

- Born: April 9, 1917; New York City, New York
- Died: July 28, 2001 (aged 84); Los Angeles, California
- Education: University of Southern California (1936)
- Spouse(s): Doris Sonia Nathanson (m. 1947) Chantal Mastey (m. 1967)

Martin Stern Jr. (April 9, 1917 – July 28, 2001) was an American architect who was most widely known for his large scale designs and structures in Las Vegas, Nevada. He is credited with originating the concept of the structurally integrated casino resort complex in Las Vegas.

== Early life, education and career ==
Martin Stern Jr. was born in New York in 1917. He moved to Los Angeles in the 1930's to work in the movie industry as a studio sketch artist. He graduated from the University of Southern California before briefly working for Paul R. Williams. In 1945, he opened his own practice in 8912 Burton Way, Beverly Hills. His early work in Los Angeles included custom homes and garden apartments like Manchester Gardens, Wilshire-La Cienega Gardens, and Belford Gardens. He also designed apartment and office buildings. He then had a brief hiatus from architecture when he served in the U.S. Armed Forces around 1950.

After his military service, he returned to work. He collaborated with William Cody on the Tamarisk Country Club in Palm Springs, as well as multiple shopping centers, housing tracts, homes and coffee shops. Stern was probably best known in Los Angeles for three Ships coffee shops opened in 1956 and 1957 by Emmet Shipman. One was in Wilshire Boulevard and Glendon Avenue in Westwood, another in 1016 La Cienega Boulevard in Los Angeles, and the third in 10705 Washington Boulevard in Culver City.

In August 1947 at the Pueblo Oratorio in the Chapman Park Hotel, Stern married Doris Sonia Nathanson (1919–2008). Doris was the daughter of Abraham Nathanson of Philadelphia. Martin and Doris had two sons. After they divorced, in 1967 Stern remarried to Chantal Maspey, with whom he had a son and a daughter.

== High-rising Las Vegas ==
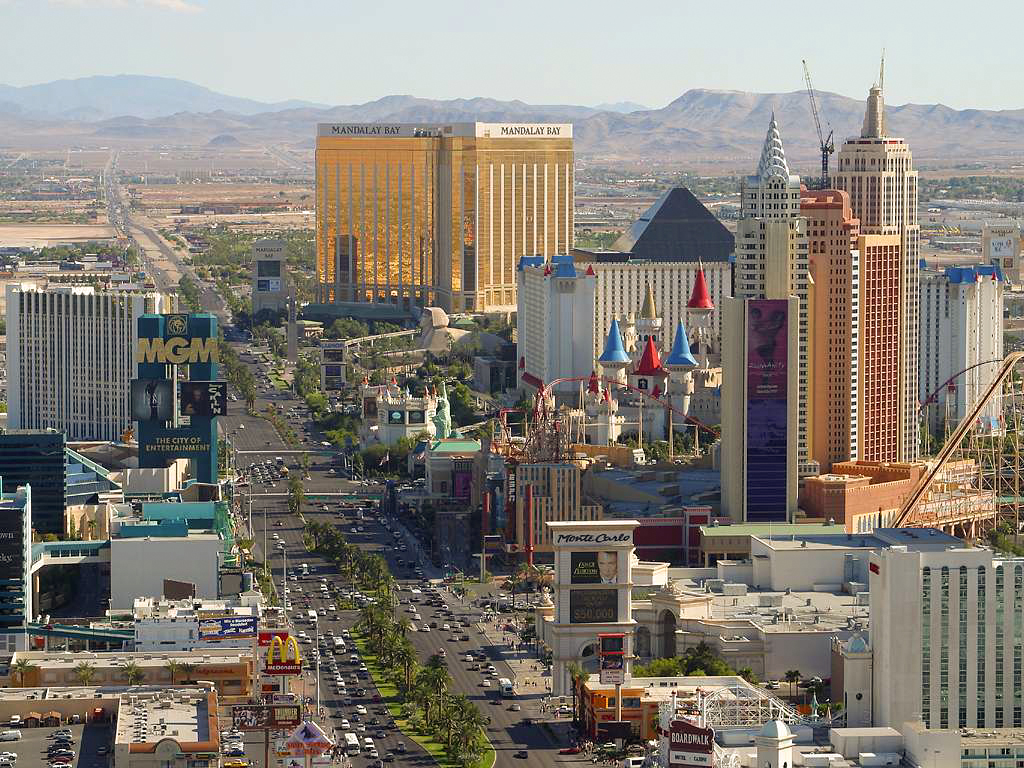
Las Vegas transformed by high-rises

Martin Stern Jr. designed the International Hotel, which later became the Las Vegas Hilton, and the first MGM Grand Hotel and Casino, two pivotal Martin Stern Jr. projects with entrepreneur Kirk Kerkorian in 1969 and 1973, which set the pace for the transformation of Las Vegas from a low-rise sprawl of motels, clubs and parking lots into an extravagant high-rise metropolis.

The Daily Telegraph (London) wrote of the first Stern and Kerkorian project in its September 2001 eulogy to Stern: "The International, whose tri-form 30-floor tower contained 1,519 rooms and became the most imitated building on the Las Vegas Strip, provided the model for the Bellagio, Treasure Island, Mirage and Mandalay Bay, among other hotels." When it was completed, the International was the largest hotel in the world.

The first MGM Grand, with more square footage than the Empire State Building and in its turn the largest hotel in the world, burned in 1980 in what is considered the worst disaster in Nevada state history. As the Telegraph observed, this loss only seven years after the hotel was completed was devastating to Stern. The MGM Grand was nonetheless rebuilt within eight months and reopened. It was sold in 1985 and rebranded as Bally's and is now Horseshoe Las Vegas.

Construction magnate Del Webb was another major client with whom Stern worked on many projects, including twenty years of elaborate stages of expansion of the Sahara Hotel and Casino between 1963 and 1983.

== Legacy ==
=== Death ===
Martin Stern Jr. closed his architectural practice in 1996 and donated many of his drawings and plans to the University of Nevada, Las Vegas Library. He died on July 28, 2001, at the age of 84. He was survived by his wife, Chantal, four children, four grandchildren, and his sister.

=== Archives ===
The extensive Lied Library and Architecture Studies Library inventories of the University of Nevada, Las Vegas Department of Special Collections document more than one hundred Martin Stern Jr. projects between 1951 and 1989, several of which — including the near-legendary Xanadu envisioned in 1975 — were never built. Dreaming the Skyline: Resort Architecture and the New Urban Space is an online collection from UNLV Libraries Digital Collections that includes several hundred images of Stern's work, including architectural plans and photographs.

== Selected works ==
Nearly half of Martin Stern Jr.'s projects were in Nevada while another quarter were in California. The rest were in other states including Arizona, Hawaii, Illinois, New Jersey, New York, Oregon, Texas, and Utah, and in at least three other countries: Australia, Japan, and Slovenia, which was then part of Yugoslavia.

The following partial listing by decades sketches less than one third of Stern's work.

=== 1950s ===
- 1951: 10401 Wilshire Apartment Building, Los Angeles, California
- 1954: Clark Market, Torrance, California
- 1955: Encino Village, a subdivision of 400 homes in Encino, Los Angeles, California.
- 1955: Holiday Hotel Reno in Reno, Nevada - the birthplace of the World Series of Poker.
- 1958-61: Mountain Shadows (later a Marriott resort) in Scottsdale, Arizona (Demolished)
- 1959: Del Webb's Towne House, on Market between 7th and 8th Streets in San Francisco, California. (Demolished)
- 1959 Sahara Hotel (Tunis Tower), Las Vegas, Nevada

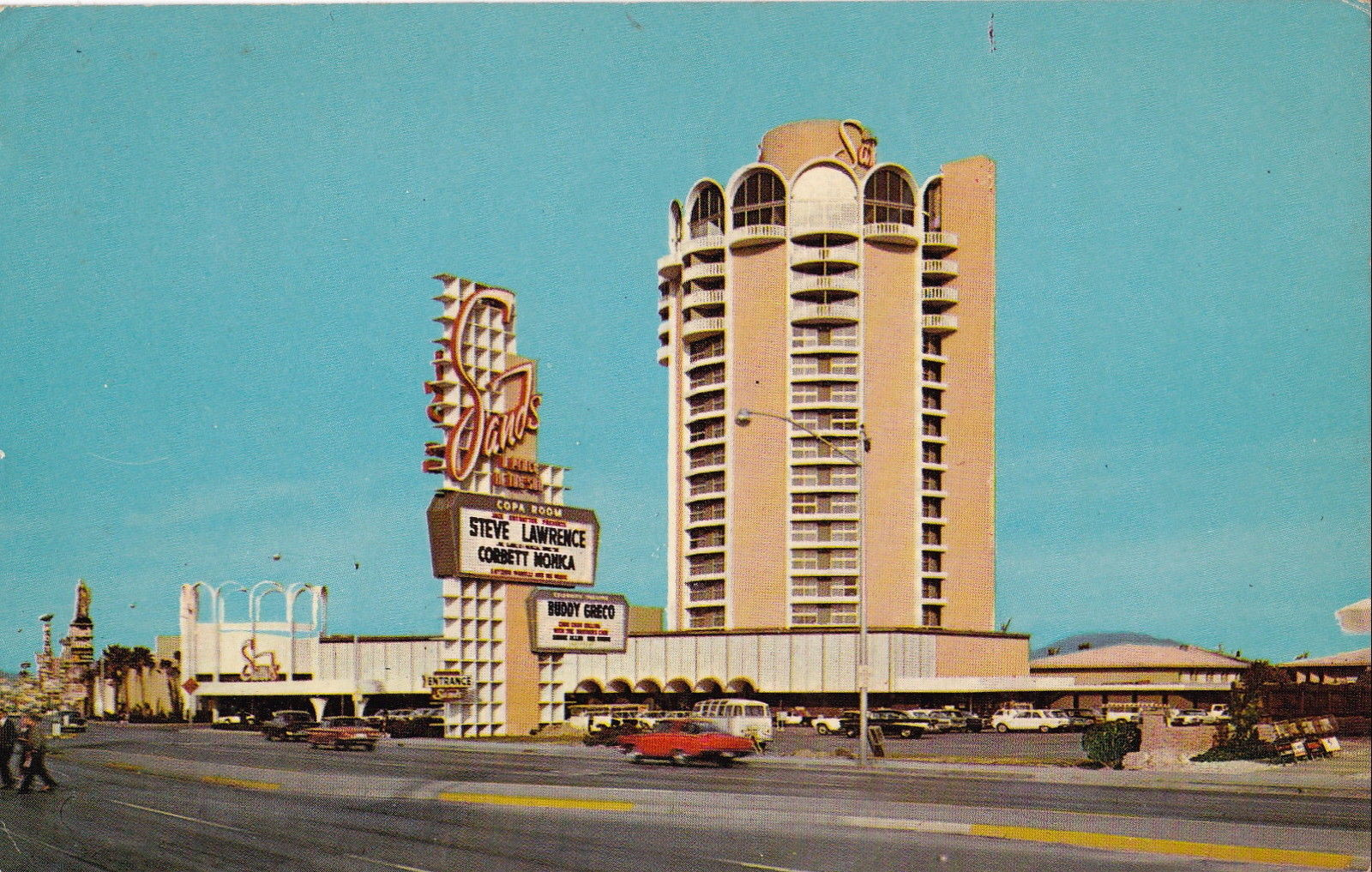
Sands Hotel and Casino, Las Vegas

=== 1960s ===
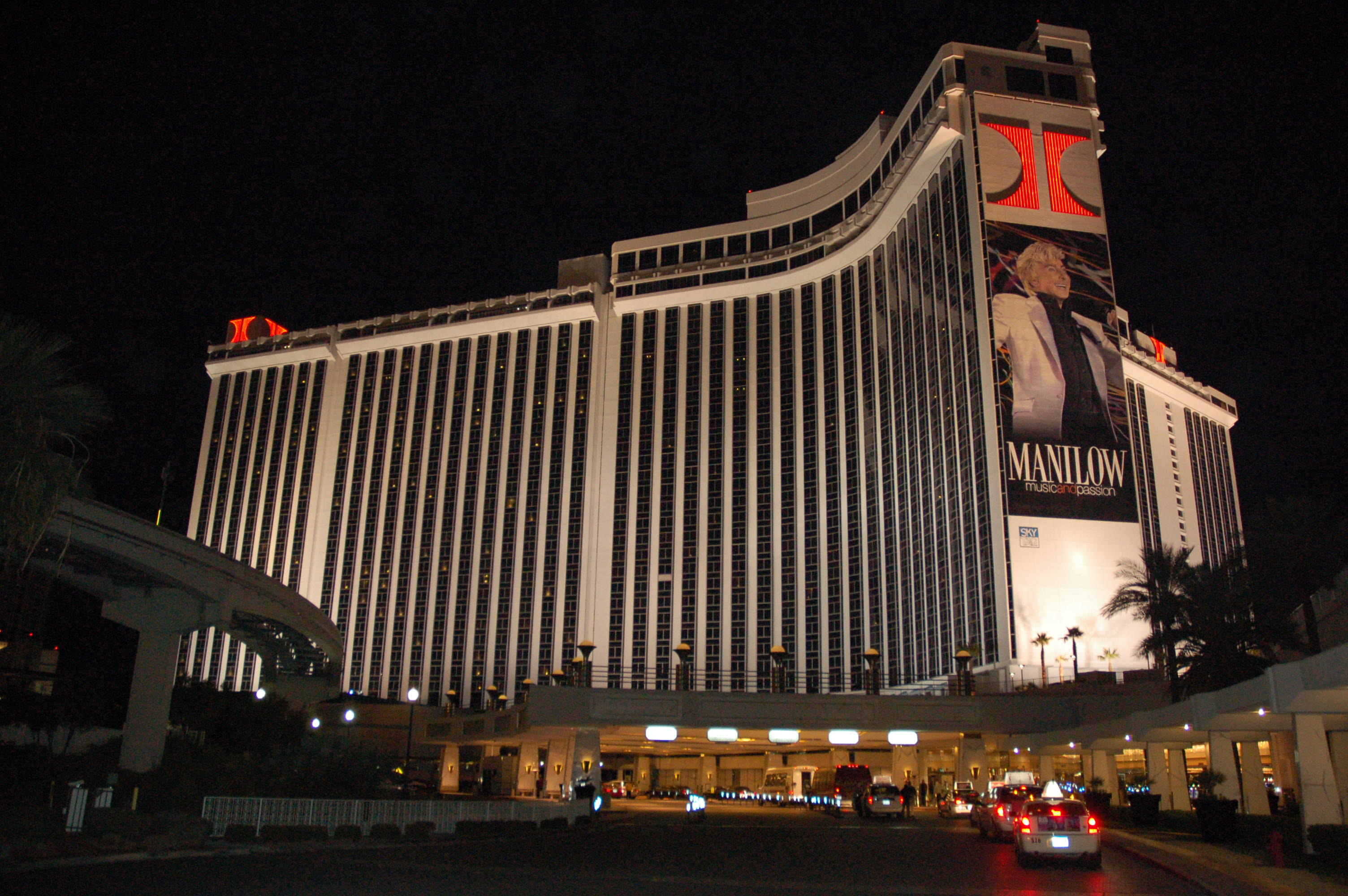
Las Vegas Hilton, formerly the International Hotel

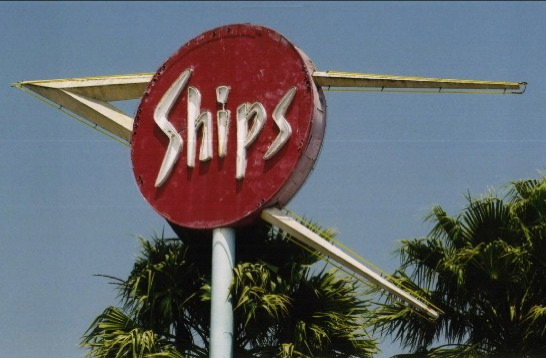
Ship's Coffee Shop sign

- 1960: Paradise Valley Country Club, Paradise Valley, Arizona
- 1963: Ship's Coffee Shop, Los Angeles, California, in the space age Googie style which The New York Times credited Stern with pioneering.
- 1963: Beverly Hills, California Public Library.
- 1963: Sahara Hotel, (Alexandra Tower), Las Vegas.
- 1963: Harvey's Lake Tahoe (Mountain Tower)
- 1964: The Mint (tower addition), Las Vegas
- 1964: Ka'anapali Beach Hotel, Maui, Hawaii
- 1964: Del Webb's Ocean House (later acquired by Hilton Hotels) in Mission Bay, San Diego, California.
- 1965: Sahara Tahoe Hotel
- 1965: Sands Hotel (tower and renovation) Las Vegas, (Demolished)
- 1966: The Silver Slipper Hotel, known for its giant rotating rooftop silver slipper, Las Vegas. Purchased in 1968 by Howard Hughes.
- 1969: King's Castle (later the Tahoe Hyatt) in Incline Village, Nevada
- 1969: International Hotel, with Kirk Kirkorian. The International Hotel was purchased by the Hilton Hotels Corporation in 1970 and renamed the Las Vegas Hilton in 1971.

=== 1970s ===
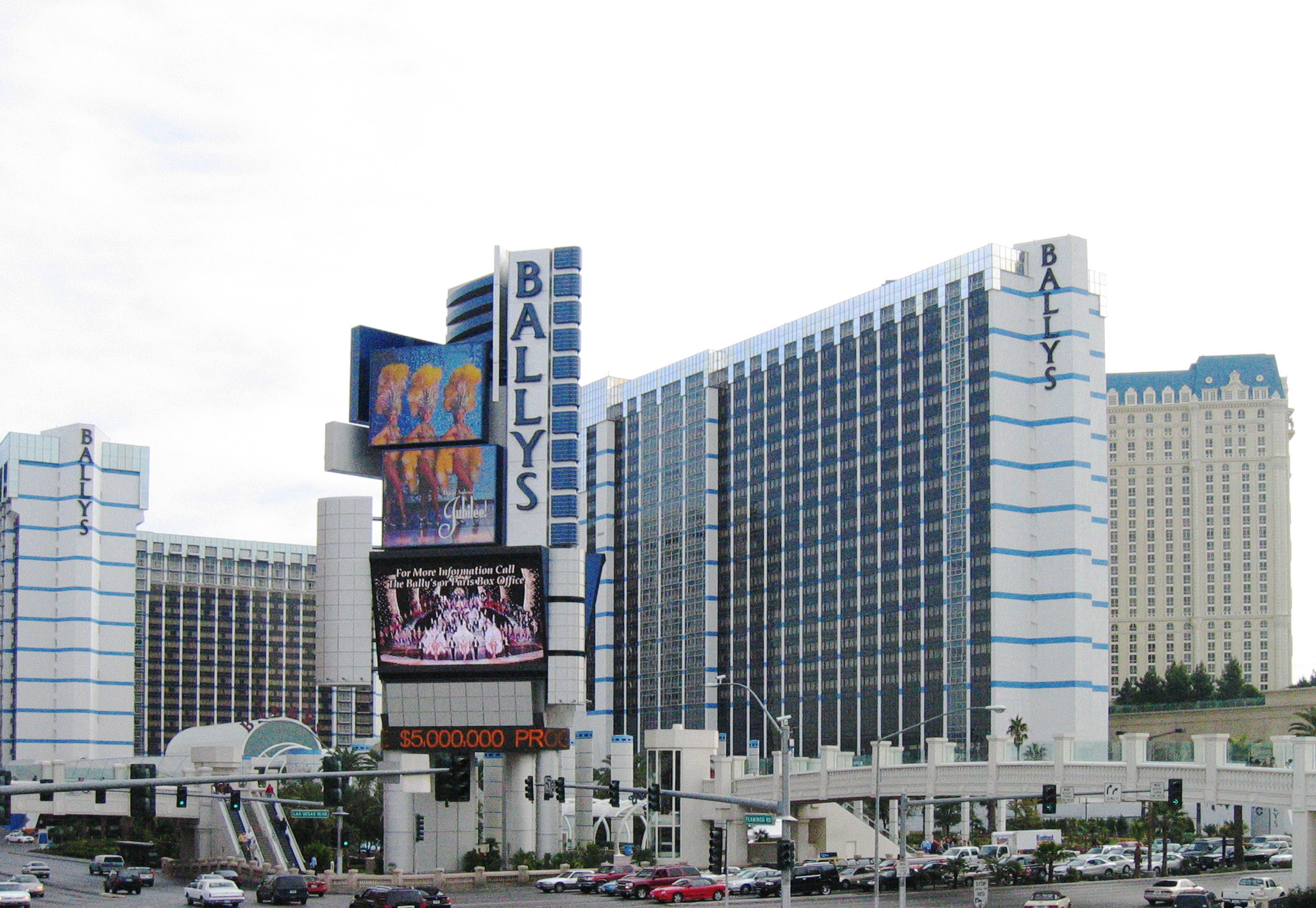
Bally's Hotel and Casino, formerly the MGM Grand, Las Vegas

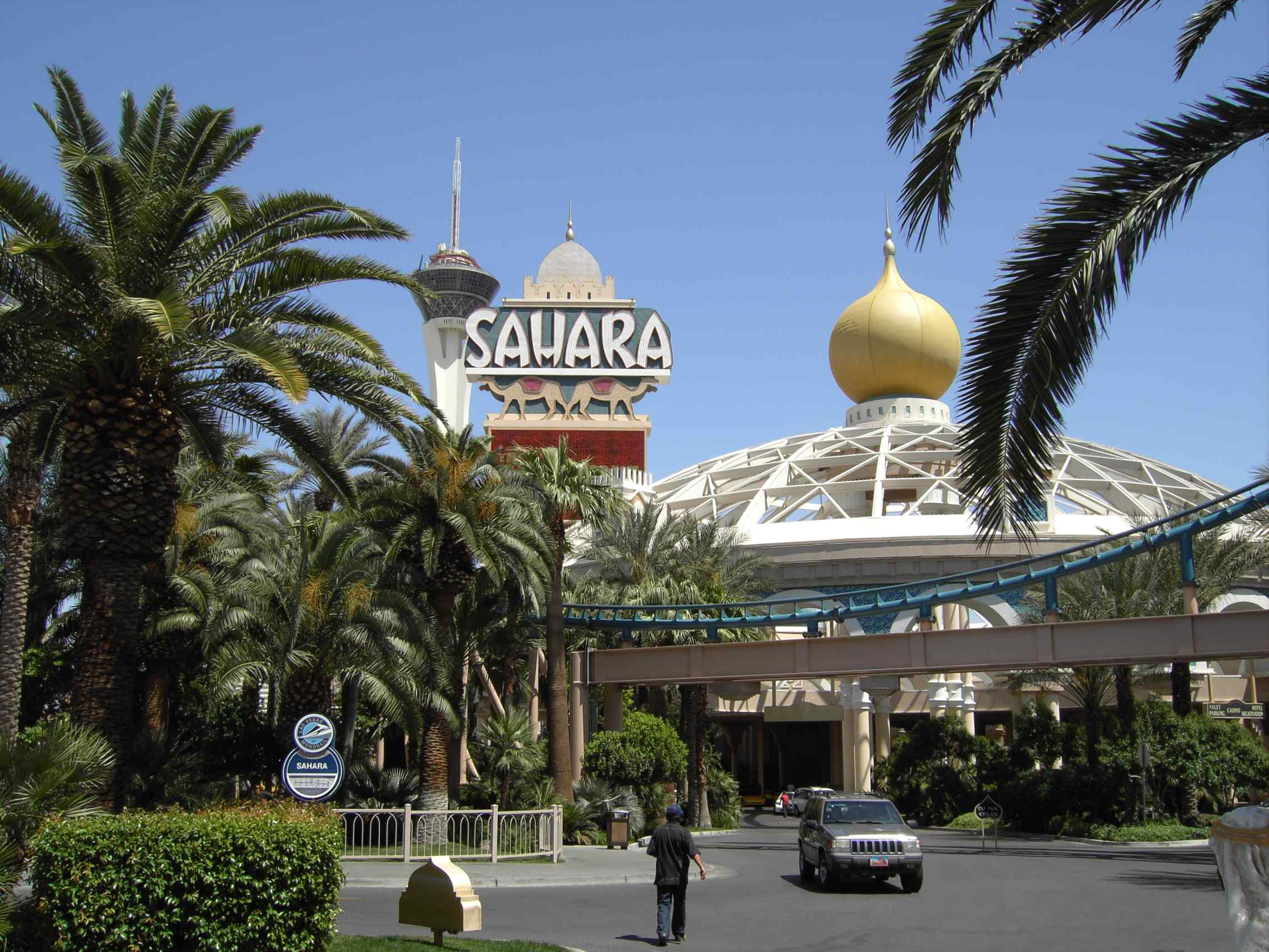
The Sahara Hotel and Casino, Las Vegas

- 1970: Kuilima Hotel and Golf Course, North Shore Oahu at Kahuku, Hawaii (originally a Del Web Resort; later known as the Turtle Bay Resort)
- 1971: Harold's Club Reno
- 1971: Little America Hotels in Paradise Valley, Flagstaff and Tucson, Arizona and in Salt Lake City, Utah.
- 1973: MGM Grand Hotel and Casino with Kirk Kirkorian. Rebuilt after the 1980 MGM Grand fire. Sold in 1986 and reopened as Bally's Las Vegas.
- 1974: Las Vegas Hilton Benihana Village (addition).
- 1974: Riviera Hotel (Monte Carlo Tower), Las Vegas, (Demolished)
- 1975-79: The Mint Las Vegas - now part of Binion's Gambling Hall and Hotel
- 1978: Sahara Hotel (Tangiers Tower), Las Vegas
- 1979: Rainbow Plaza Resort Hotel, Niagara Falls, New York
- 1979: The D Las Vegas Resort
- 1979: Ibusuki Hotel, Ibusuki, Kagoshima, Japan

=== 1980s ===
- 1982: Breakwater Island Resort Queensland, Australia
- 1982: Valley Bank, Spring Valley, Nevada
- 1985: Nova Gorica Hotel/Casino, Nova Gorica, Slovenia
- 1986: Darling Harbour Hotel, Darling Harbour, New South Wales, Australia
- 1986: Harvey's Lake Tahoe (Lake Tower)
- 1987: Embassy Suites Hotel, South Lake Tahoe, California
- 1988: Rivera Hotel (Monaco Tower), Las Vegas, (Demolished)
- 1988: Normandie Club, Gardena, California

=== 1990s ===
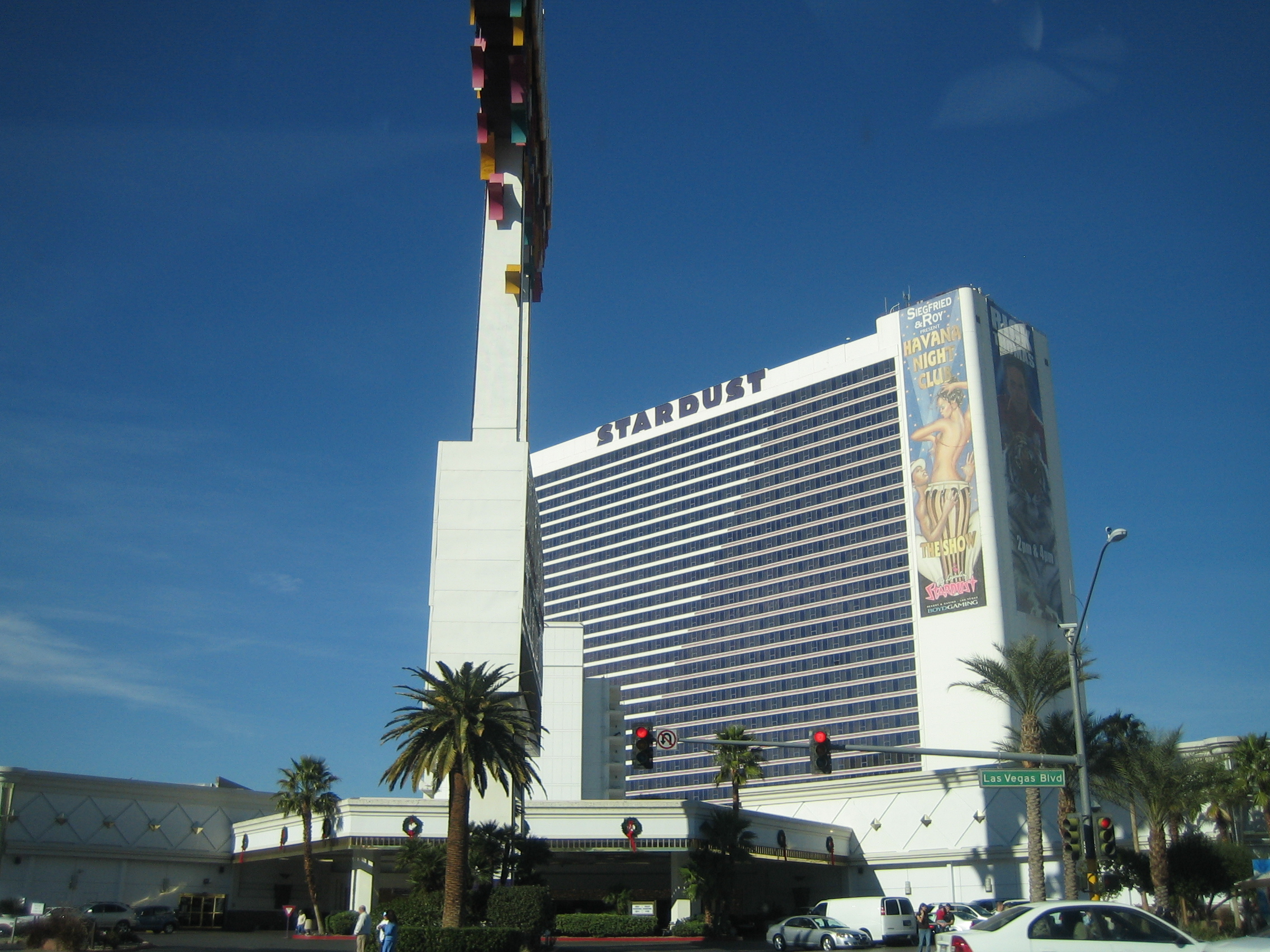
Stardust Hotel and Casino, West Tower, Las Vegas

- 1990: Flamingo Hotel (tower renovation), Las Vegas
- 1991: Stardust Hotel (West Tower), Las Vegas (Demolished)
