= The Mint Las Vegas =

Casino hotel in Nevada, United States

Coordinates: 36.1715°N 115.1446°W

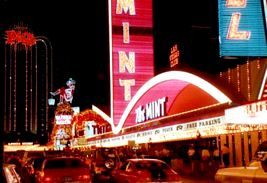

- Location within Downtown Las Vegas Location within Nevada
- Interactive map of The Mint
- Location: Las Vegas, Nevada, United States; 100 Fremont Street
- Opened: July 12, 1957
- Closed: July 1, 1988; 38 years ago
- No. of rooms: 300
- Casino type: Land-based
- Owner: Del Webb
- Architect: Zick & Sharp (casino), Yesco (neon sign), Martin Stern (hotel tower)
- Renovated in: 1965

The Mint Las Vegas was a hotel and casino in downtown Las Vegas, Nevada.

The Mint was the sponsor of the Mint 400, the largest off-road race from the mid-1960s to the mid-1980s.

The Mint was the first night's stay in Hunter S. Thompson and Oscar Acosta's legendary 1971 weekend trip to Las Vegas, immortalized in Thompson's novel Fear and Loathing in Las Vegas.

== History ==
The Mint opened July 12, 1957. The four major owners were Milton Prell, Al Winter, L.B. “Tutor” Scherer, and J.D. “Joe” Hall, and the first general manager was Sam Boyd. Architects for the building were Walter Zick and Harris Sharp. The Mint’s neon sign was designed by Ed Harris of Zick & Sharp in collaboration with Young Electric Sign Co.

Milton Prell and partners sold The Mint and their other two Las Vegas properties Sahara Las Vegas and Lucky Strike Club to the Del Webb Corporation in 1961, creating the subsidiary Sahara-Nevada Corp. as the new owner. They announced plans for a 22-story hotel skyscraper addition to the Mint in 1962. The addition was expected to be completed within 16 months, at a cost of $5 million. The addition would be built on the Mint's north parking lot and was to include 300 additional hotel rooms and suites. A six-story, 210,000 sq ft (20,000 m^{2}) parking garage would be connected to the new hotel building and would include more than 550 parking spaces. In May 1962, the city planned to review the permit for the new tower. A groundbreaking ceremony was held for the tower in July 1962.

Construction was still ongoing in July 1964, at which point the tower was planned to include 24 floors. Construction reached the 24th floor at the end of the year, with plans for an additional four floors. The hotel tower was ultimately built with 26 stories, and was topped out on March 20, 1965, with plans to open later that month. The new tower stood 290 ft (88 m), and was one of the tallest buildings in the state at the time, ranking only behind The Landmark Hotel and Casino, which stood 297 ft (91 m). Renovations were also done to the existing building, which included work to the Merri Mint Theatre, and expanded dining areas.

In 1988, The Mint was sold and became part of Binion's Horseshoe.

== Shows ==
Patsy Cline performed at the Mint Casino's "Merri-Mint Theater" from Nov. 25 to Dec. 27, 1962 three months before her fatal plane crash. She appeared with Tompall & the Glaser Brothers, and at one point developed "Vegas Throat" due to the dry desert heat. For several shows, Cline lip-synched to her records. Kitty Wells followed Patsy into The Mint. The Wilburn Brothers, with Loretta Lynn as part of their act, played the Merri-Mint for a couple of nights in October 1962. Tompall & the Glaser Brothers were also headliners at The Mint for six weeks from May to June 1963.

According to author Larry Jordan, in his book "Jim Reeves: His Untold Story," Reeves also played at the Mint Casino in the early-1960s. Peter Urquidi, "Man of Many Sounds", played the Top of the Mint for more than a decade until the early-1970s. Upstairs in the lounge was the Johnny Elvis Foster show For The Love Of Elvis. The Memphis Sound also played at the Mint. Sidney Fields of Abbott and Costello fame appeared on the same bill in a comedy act.

== In popular culture ==
=== Film history ===
The Mint's casino appears in the 1964 film Viva Las Vegas and in the 1971 James Bond film Diamonds Are Forever. The Mint's building can be seen in the background toward the end of the 1984 film Starman. It can also be seen in the background of the 1968 film They Came to Rob Las Vegas. The casino can also be seen several times towards the end of the 1987 U2 music video "I Still Haven't Found What I'm Looking For", which was filmed entirely on Fremont Street.

A computer-generated reconstruction of the casino can be seen in the 1998 film Fear and Loathing In Las Vegas. A casino in Tunica, Mississippi was used to depict the Mint in the 2005 film Walk the Line. The Mint is also seen in music videos by Panic! at the Disco from their 2013 album, Too Weird to Live, Too Rare to Die! and also featured in Father John Misty's video for "Mr. Tillman".

=== Television history ===
In the 1975 episode of Kojak titled "A House of Prayer, a Den of Thieves", a sniper shoots a witness whom Kojak has arrested from a room at the Mint. The hotel building can also be seen in the closing credits of the ABC television show Vega$ (1978-1981), which starred Robert Urich. The Mint is also a backdrop in Crime Story (1980's) season 2 episode 18, a sniper shoots at a witness being held to testify against organized crime in Las Vegas.

The Mint was featured in an episode of Ghost Adventures entitled Binion's Hotel and Casino where they investigated claims of paranormal activity and full-bodied apparitions inside the 25-story tower, which has been sealed off since its closing.
