= Sam's Town (disambiguation) =

Sam's Town is a 2006 album by the Killers.

Sam's Town may also refer to:

== Casinos ==
- Sam's Town Hotel and Gambling Hall, an American gaming brand based in Paradise, Las Vegas
  - Sam's Town Hotel and Gambling Hall, Las Vegas – operating in Sunrise Manor, Nevada, since 1979
  - Sam's Town Hotel and Gambling Hall, Shreveport – operating in Shreveport, Louisiana, since 2004
  - Sam's Town Hotel and Gambling Hall, Tunica – operated in Tunica Resorts, Mississippi, from 1994 to 2025
  - Sam's Town Gambling Hall, Kansas City – operated in Kansas City, Missouri, from 1995 to 1998
  - Sam's Town Gold River – operated in Laughlin, Nevada, from 1984 to 1991; now Laughlin River Lodge

== Motorsports ==
- Sam's Town 250, a NASCAR Craftsman Truck Series race held at Las Vegas Motor Speedway in 1998
- Sam's Town 250, a NASCAR Busch Series race held at Memphis International Raceway from 1999 to 2007
- Sam's Town 300, a NASCAR Busch Series race held at Las Vegas Motor Speedway from 1998 to 2013
- Sam's Town 400, a NASCAR Craftsman Truck Series race held at Texas Motor Speedway from 2006 to 2008
