= Sam's Town Hotel and Gambling Hall, Las Vegas =

Casino hotel in Sunrise Manor, Nevada

Coordinates: 36.11257°N 115.062304°W

Sam's Town

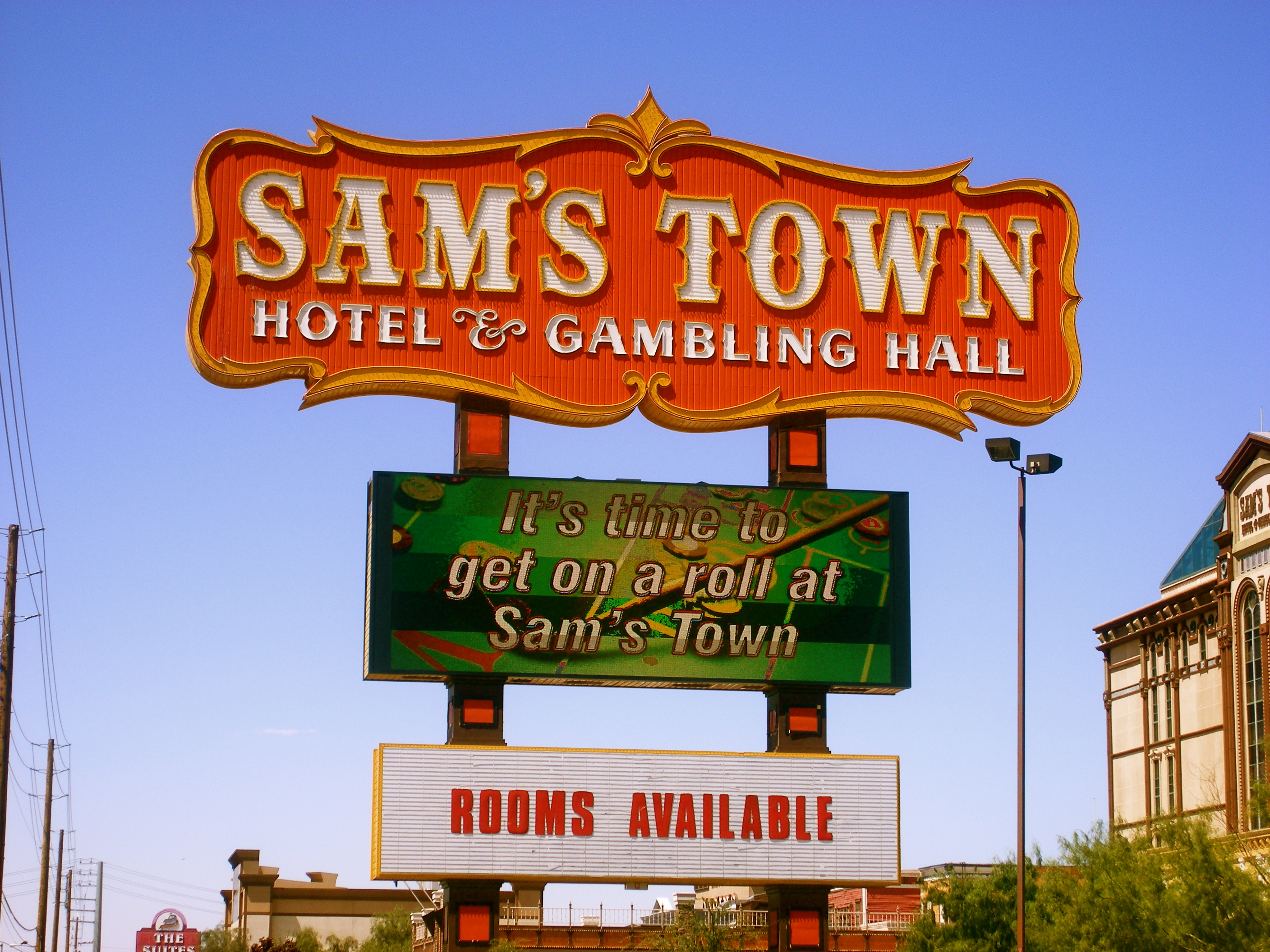
- Sam's Town sign in 2008
- Interactive map of Sam's Town
- Location: Sunrise Manor, Nevada, U.S.; 5111 Boulder Highway
- Opened: March 1979
- Theme: Old West
- No. of rooms: 646
- Gaming space: 120,681 sq ft (11,211.6 m^{2})
- Permanent shows: Laser and water show
- Signature attractions: Mystic Falls; Century Theatres; Sam's Town Bowling Center
- Notable restaurants: Angry Butcher Steakhouse
- Casino type: Land-based
- Owner: Boyd Gaming
- Renovated in: 1994, 2000, 2008
- Website: Official website

Sam's Town Hotel and Gambling Hall, Las Vegas, also known as Sam's Town Las Vegas, is a hotel and locals casino in Sunrise Manor, Nevada, located east of Las Vegas. It is named after Sam Boyd, and is owned and operated by Boyd Gaming under the Sam's Town Hotel and Gambling Hall brand. It includes a 120,681 sq ft (11,211.6 m^{2}) casino, a nine-story hotel with 646 rooms, and an RV park.

Sam's Town opened in March 1979, with 204 rooms. The property was expanded multiple times to add new features, including a 56-lane bowling alley in 1981. The original hotel rooms were later demolished to make way for the nine-story tower, which opened in 1994. The tower's atrium includes an indoor park, which serves as the venue for a nightly laser and water show. Another expansion, completed in 2000, included the addition of a movie theater.

From 1998 to 2014, the property sponsored the Sam's Town 300, an annual NASCAR Xfinity Series race held at nearby Las Vegas Motor Speedway

== History ==
Sam's Town was announced in April 1978. Named after local businessman Sam Boyd, it would be operated by him and his son Bill, owners of the California hotel-casino in downtown Las Vegas and the Eldorado casino in nearby Henderson.

Bill Boyd traveled between the two casinos daily along Boulder Highway, where he owned one-fourth of a five-acre site. He and his partners eventually purchased the full site and adjacent acreage, all of which would be used for Sam's Town. The site was considered desirable because of its high vehicle traffic, but due to its remote location at the time, executives in the gaming industry were skeptical that the project would succeed. As Bill Boyd later recalled, "They said 'You must be out of your mind going out into the desert to build a casino.'" Sam's Town was built along the Boulder Strip, which would later include rivals Boulder Station and Arizona Charlie's Boulder. Before Sam's Town was announced, Sam Boyd had wanted to build a hotel in Henderson, although he encountered problems in his effort to do so.

Groundbreaking for Sam's Town took place on September 6, 1978. The hotel portion opened in early March 1979, and the casino debuted on March 22. Sam's Town opened with an Old West theme and was decorated in Sam Boyd's favorite colors: red, black and gold. The property included 204 rooms in a three-floor hotel, which surrounded a swimming pool. The casino had 400 slot machines and 21 table games. Other features included a banquet room with seating for 400 people. The property cost $12 million.

Sam's Town was built as a locals casino and became a popular gathering place among area residents, who would make up nearly 85 percent of its clientele as of 1999. The brand also expanded to other locales, with Sam's Town Gold River (1984), Sam's Town Tunica (1994), Sam's Town Kansas City (1995), and Sam's Town Shreveport (2004).

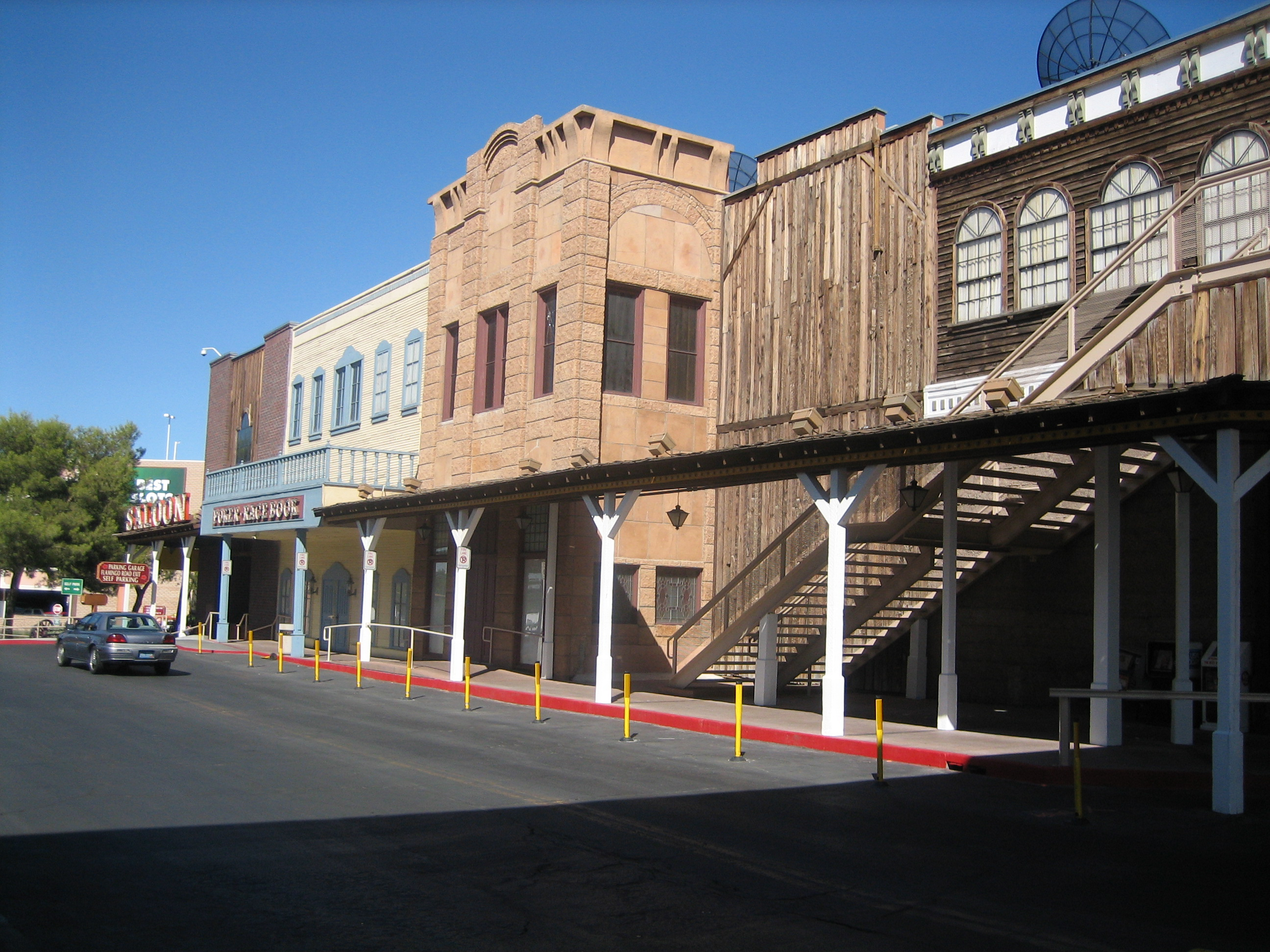
Western-themed exterior facades at Sam's Town, 2007

The original Sam's Town in Las Vegas would be expanded many times. Plans for an RV park were approved by the county six months after the property opened. In 1981, Sam's Town added the 25,000 sq ft (2,300 m^{2}) Western Emporium, and a 56-lane bowling center, which would go on to host numerous tournaments.

In 1983, gaming space was expanded in a $3.5 million project that included a 600-seat bingo room and a larger poker room. In 1985, to deal with high demand for its sports book, the casino added a drive-through feature, inspired by a similar concept already present at a casino in Laughlin, Nevada. A $25 million expansion took place in 1987. It included an enlargement of the casino floor, new restaurants, and a parking garage. The project also added 293 spaces to the RV park, for a total of 500.

Sam Boyd died in 1993, at the age of 82. Construction of a nine-story hotel tower began later that year, as part of another expansion project completed in 1994. The original hotel rooms were demolished to accommodate the tower, which has 646 rooms. The 1994 expansion also added two new restaurants, a food court, a sports bar, and a second parking garage.

From 1980 to 1998, the studios of Nevada Public Radio were located in a separate building on the Sam's Town property.

In 1998, the property began sponsoring the Sam's Town 300, an annual NASCAR race held at Las Vegas Motor Speedway. It would be renamed the Boyd Gaming 300 in 2014. Sam's Town has also been the site of race registration and awards banquets for the Silver State Classic Challenge.

By 1998, Sam's Town sought to broaden its customer base beyond the 55-to-65 age demographic, hoping to attract both younger and older clients. The property was also considered too small to meet customer demand. An $86 million renovation and expansion took place from 1999 to 2000, a project which toned down the property's country theme. The Western Emporium was gutted to make way for more casino space, and other new features included an updated buffet, a pool, a child-care center, and a third parking garage. Sam's Town also added an 18-screen Century Theatres facility, which would help it to compete against newer, nearby rivals Boulder Station and Sunset Station. Another new feature was Sam's Town Live, a 1,050-seat showroom, which helped to broaden the property's client base.

The Killers, a Las Vegas-based band, named their 2006 album Sam's Town in honor of the property.

From 2007 to 2008, Sam's Town spent $20 million on upgrades to remain competitive, as the opening of nearby Eastside Cannery approached. Changes included sports book improvements and dining updates. In 2014, Boyd Gaming made a deal for the RV park to rebrand as a Kampgrounds of America franchise. A new restaurant, Angry Butcher Steakhouse, debuted in 2016.

Between 2016 and to 2020, the casino held several boxing events, featuring well-known promotional companies such as Mayweather Promotions, Roy Jones Jr. Boxing Promotions and TGB Promotions regularly hosting events.

As of 2017, the casino includes 120,681 sq ft (11,211.6 m^{2}) of gaming space. In 2023, it became the last known casino to remove Full Pay Deuces Wild, a variant of video poker known for its vulnerability to advantage play.

== Atrium and show ==
The hotel tower has an atrium which includes a 25,000 sq ft (2,300 m^{2}) indoor park, Mystic Falls, on the ground floor. This area includes trees, pathways, streams, a faux mountain and waterfall, and decorative building facades. During the day, these features are illuminated by sunlight from the atrium's glass ceiling. The atrium's walls are lined with hotel room windows that overlook Mystic Falls.

Since its 1994 opening, Mystic Falls has featured a free, nightly laser and water show. At the end of each year, Mystic Falls and the show are updated with a Christmas theme, making them a popular holiday attraction among locals. The Christmas show is accompanied by fake snow and animatronic animals, which are synchronized to music. The show was updated in 2011, to include brighter lasers.

Various areas of the atrium

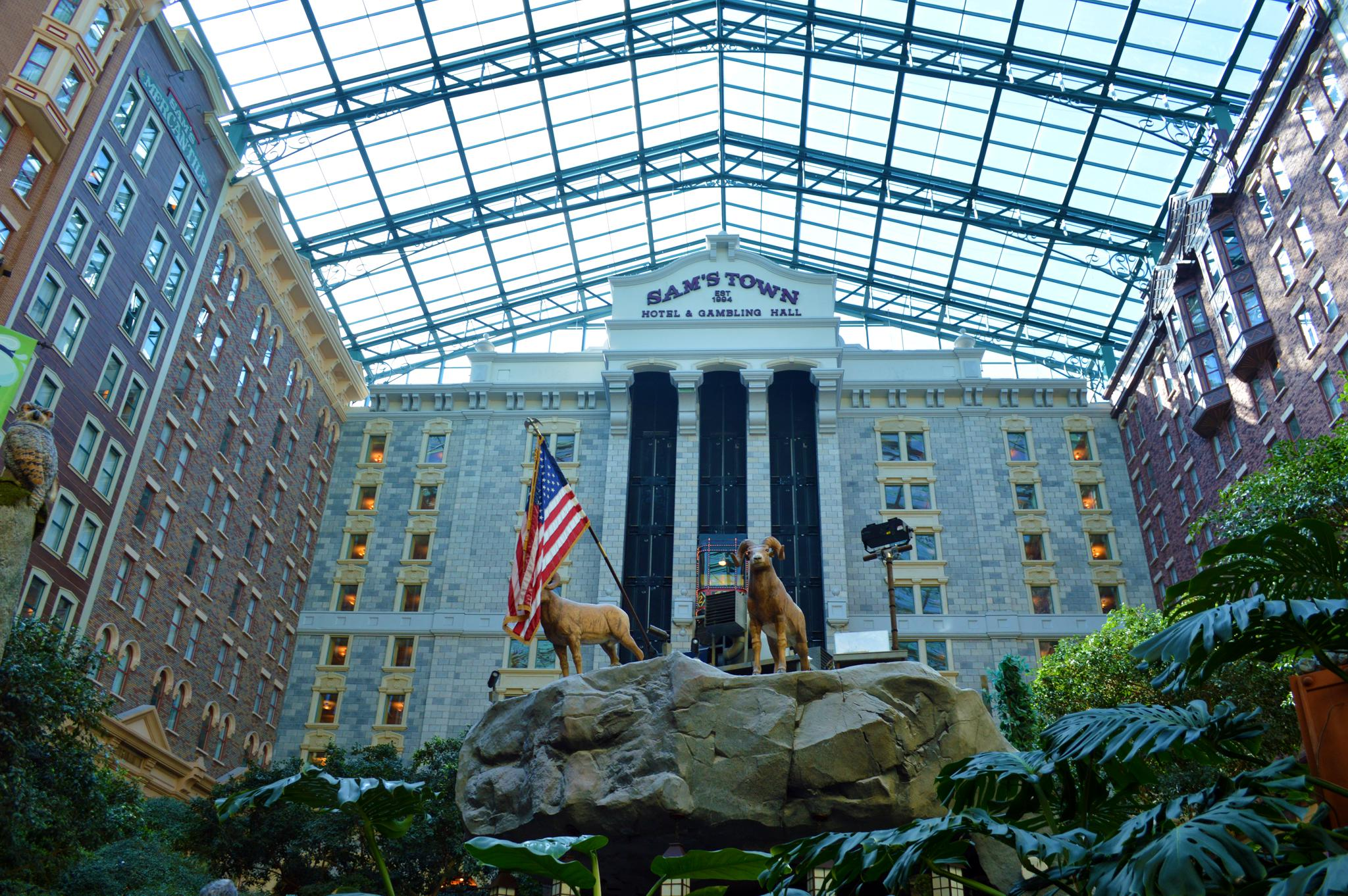

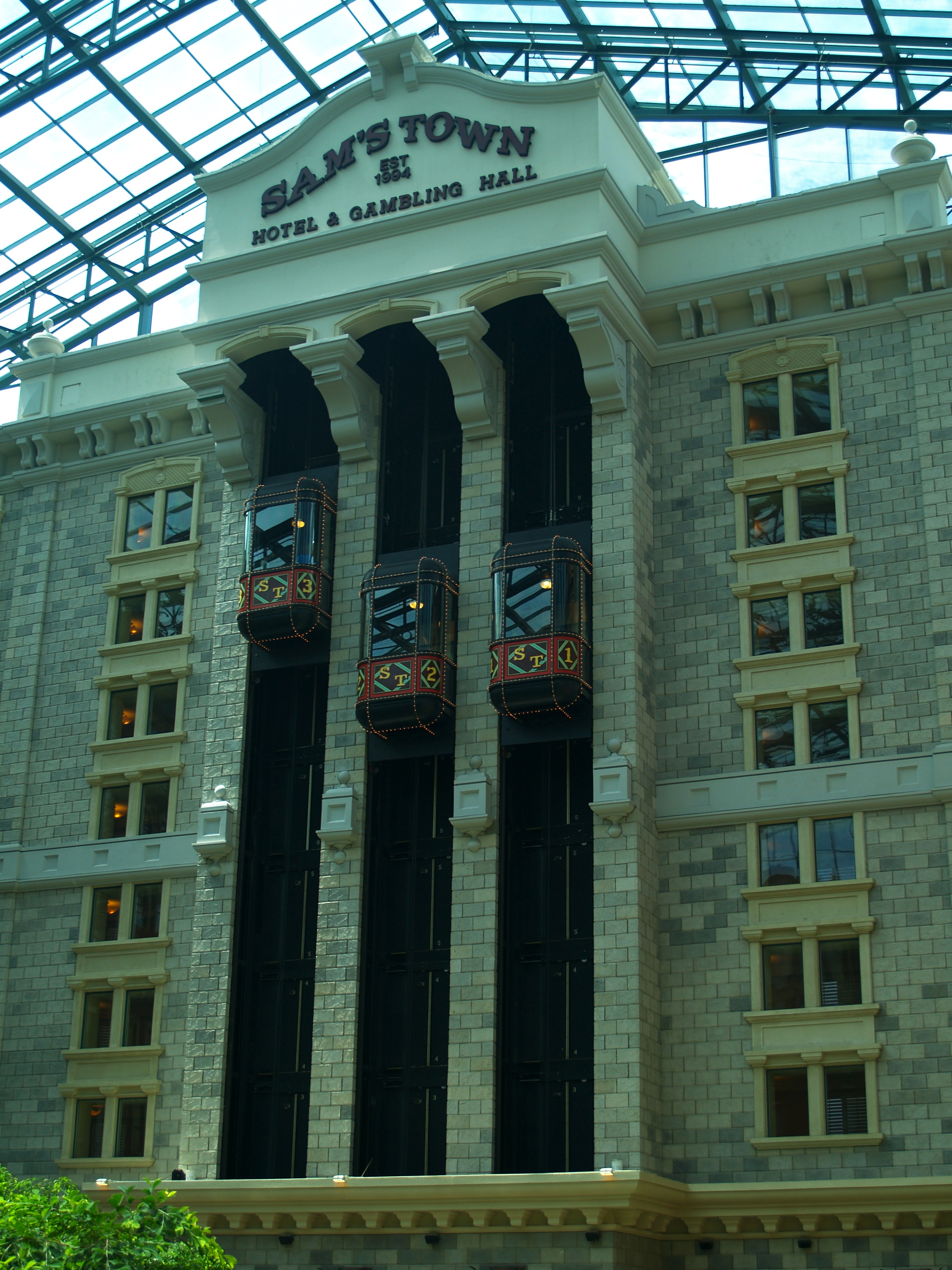

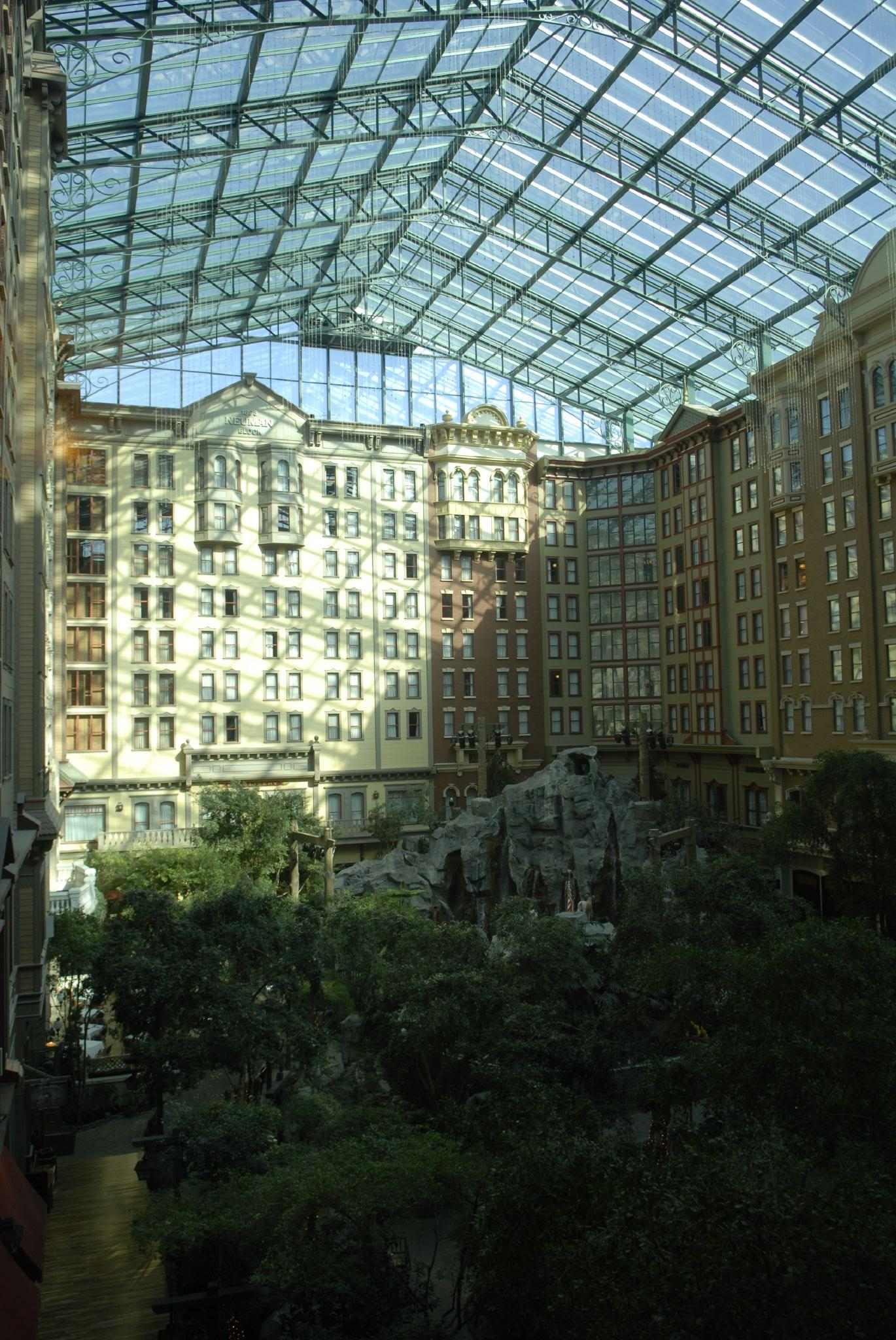

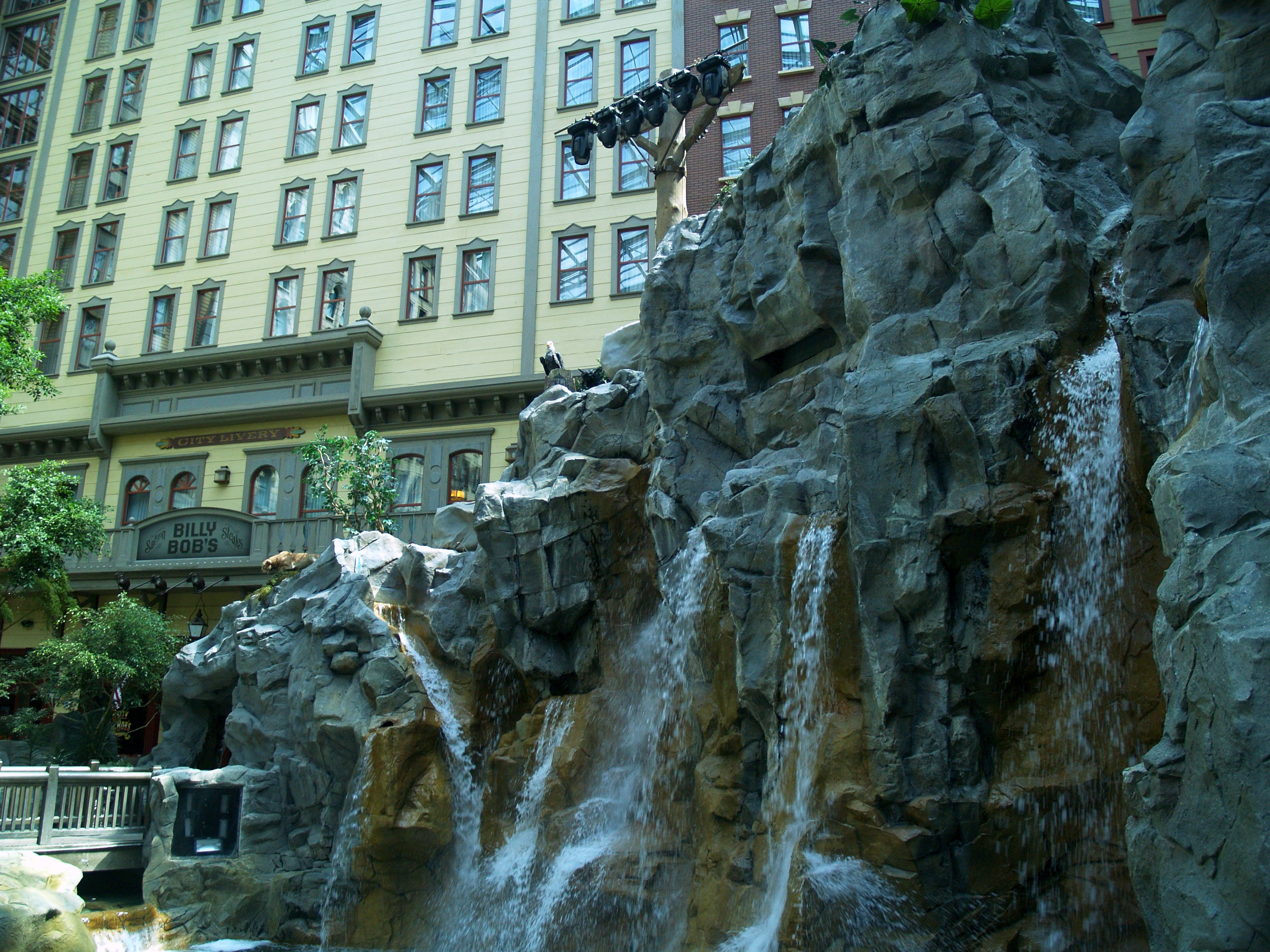
