= Beck Building =

Skyscraper in Shreveport, Louisiana

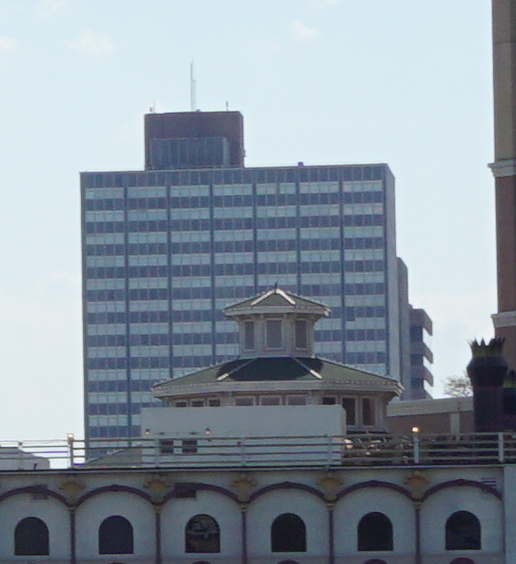
- Beck Building Bossier City September 2015 13 (Shreveport skyline) (cropped) The Beck Building in 2015

- Location within Louisiana Beck Building (the United States)

General information
- Status: Completed
- Type: Office
- Architectural style: International
- Location: 400 Travis Street, Shreveport, Louisiana, United States
- Coordinates: 32°30′52″N 93°45′00″W
- Construction started: 1955
- Completed: 1957

Height
- Roof: 265 ft (81 m)

Technical details
- Floor count: 20

Design and construction
- Architect: Neild Somdal Associates

The Beck Building is a 265 ft (81 m) tall international style office building located on 400 Travis Street in downtown Shreveport, Louisiana. The building has 20 floors and was built from 1955 to 1957. Upon its completion, it became the tallest building in Shreveport; it also became the first commercial office high-rise in northern Louisiana. In 1984, it was surpassed by the 302 ft (92 m) tall Louisiana Tower. As of February 2026, it is the 4th-tallest building in the city, with the Sam's Town Hotel, Louisiana Tower and Regions Tower being the only buildings taller than it.

The building was built to be a major office building for the local oil refining and pipeline industry. There is a chapel on the 2nd floor of the building, which is open to the public so that people could come in to pray and worship. Notable tenants include Burns & McDonnell, the Community Bank of Louisiana, and the Louisiana Oil & Gas Association.

The building was designed by local architect, Edward F. Neild.

== See also ==
- List of tallest buildings in Shreveport
- List of tallest buildings in Louisiana
- Regions Tower
- Masonic Temple (Shreveport, Louisiana)
- Shreveport Municipal Memorial Auditorium
- Bally's Shreveport
- Sam's Town Hotel and Gambling Hall, Shreveport
