= List of tallest buildings in Shreveport =

Skyline of Shreveport
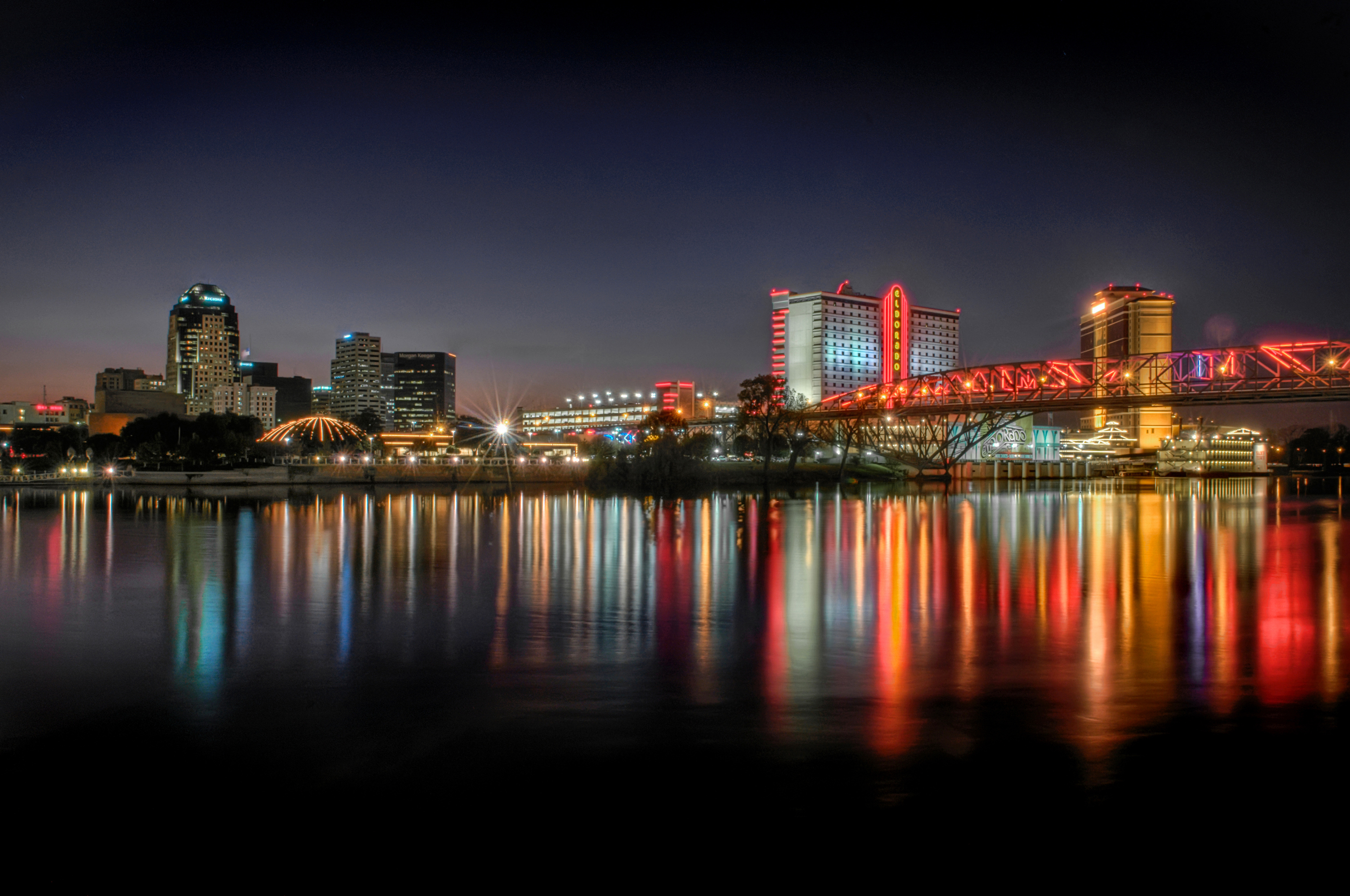
- The skyline of Shreveport in 2009
- Tallest building: Regions Tower
- Tallest building height: 364 ft (111 m)

Number of tall buildings
- 20 stories or more: 4
- Taller than 75 m (246 ft): 4
- Taller than 100 m (328 ft): 1

Number of tall buildings — feet
- Taller than 200 ft (61.0 m): 10
- Taller than 300 ft (91.4 m): 2

Shreveport is the 3rd-largest city in the U.S. state of Louisiana that lies on the Red River. The city has a population of 171,469 people as of February 2026. The city has 10 high-rises which stand over 200 ft (61 m) tall. As of February 2026, the tallest building in Shreveport is the 364 ft (111 m) tall Regions Tower which was built in 1986. The 2nd-tallest building in Shreveport is the 302 ft (92 m) tall Louisiana Tower which was built in 1984.

The most recently completed high-rise is the 291 ft (89 m) tall Sam's Town Hotel which was built in 2001.

== Map of tallest buildings ==
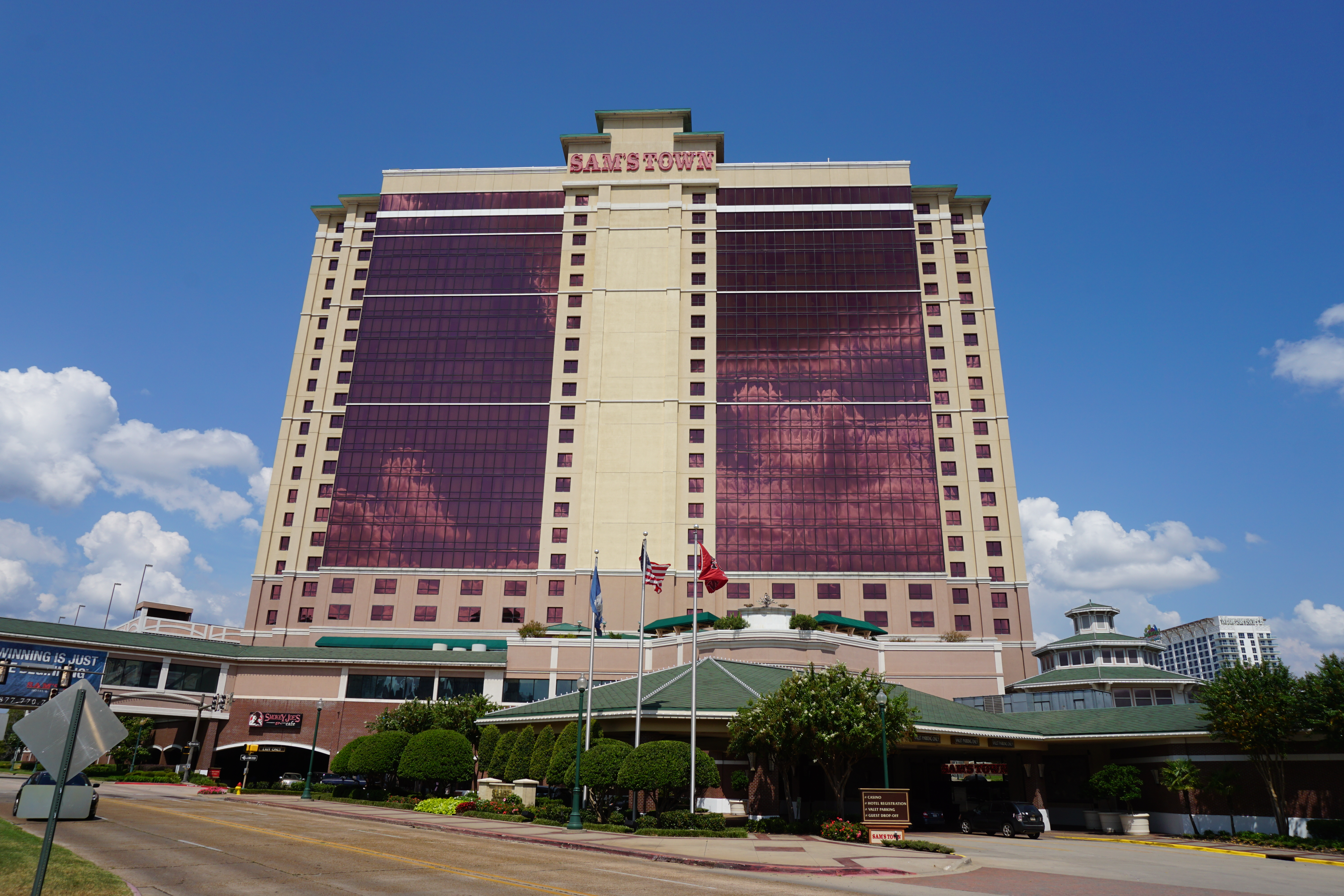
The Sam's Town Hotel is currently the 3rd-tallest building in Shreveport.

The map below shows the locations of the buildings in Shreveport that stand over 200 ft (61 m) in height. Each marker is given a number based on the buildings ranking in the list. The color of each marker represents the decade that the building was completed in. Nearly all of the tallest buildings in Shreveport are located in the central business district area, except for the Sam's Town Hotel, and the Bally's Shreveport, which are located directly on the Red River.

Buildings in Shreveport that stand over 200 ft (61 m).
- 1950s and before
- 1960s
- 1970s
- 1980s
- 1990s
- 2000s
- 2010s
- 2020s
1 Regions Tower
2 Louisiana Tower
3 Sam's Town Hotel
4 Beck Building
5 Bally's Shreveport
6 Chase Tower
7 American Tower
8 Regions Building
9 Mid-South Tower
10 Beaird Tower

== Tallest buildings ==
This list ranks buildings in Shreveport that stand at least 200 ft (61 m) tall. Spires and other architectural details are included in the height of a building, however, antennas are excluded.

Tallest building in Shreveport upon completion

Rank	Name	Image	Location	Height	Floors	Year	Purpose	Notes	References
1	Regions Tower		32°30′49″N 93°44′52″W	364 ft (111 m)	25	1986	Office	Tallest building in Shreveport since 1986.	
2	Louisiana Tower		32°30′51″N 93°44′57″W	302 ft (92 m)	21	1984	Office	Tallest building in Shreveport from 1984 to 1986.	
3	Sam's Town Hotel		32°31′07″N 93°44′44″W	291 ft (89 m)	23	2001	Casino, Hotel		
4	Beck Building		32°30′52″N 93°45′00″W	265 ft (81 m)	20	1957	Office	A chapel is located on the 2nd floor of the building. Tallest building in Shreveport from 1957 to 1984.	
5	Bally's Shreveport		32°31′02″N 93°44′40″W	237 ft (72 m)	17	2000	Hotel, Casino		
6	Chase Tower		32°30′49″N 93°44′58″W	227 ft (69 m)	15	1976	Office	Designed by Carson and Lundin.	
7	American Tower		32°30′54″N 93°44′53″W	222 ft (68 m)	16	1979	Office		
8	Regions Building		32°30′48″N 93°44′54″W	222 ft (68 m)	16	1939	Office	Tallest building in Shreveport from 1939 to 1957.	
9	Mid-South Tower		32°30′51″N 93°45′01″W	213 ft (65 m)	15	1968	Office		
10	Beaird Tower		32°30′49″N 93°45′04″W	201 ft (61 m)	13	1983	Office		

== Timeline of tallest buildings ==
Name	Image	Years as tallest	Height	Floors
Regions Building		1939-1957	222 ft (68 m)	16
Beck Building		1957-1984	265 ft (81 m)	20
Louisiana Tower		1984-1986	302 ft (92 m)	21
Regions Tower		1986-Present	364 ft (111 m)	25

== See also ==
- List of tallest buildings in New Orleans
- List of tallest buildings in Baton Rouge
- List of tallest buildings in Louisiana
- List of tallest buildings in Jackson
- List of tallest buildings in Tulsa
- List of tallest buildings in Little Rock
