= Hollywood Casino Amphitheatre =

Hollywood Casino Amphitheatre may refer to:

- Hollywood Casino Amphitheatre, now called Credit Union 1 Amphitheatre in Tinley Park, Illinois
- Hollywood Casino Amphitheatre commonly known as Riverport Amphitheatre in Maryland Heights, Missouri

== See also ==
- Hollywood Casino Corp.
