= Dotty's =

American slot machine parlor chain

- Company type: Private
- Industry: Tavern / Gaming / Foodservice
- Founded: Oregon (1991)
- Founder: Craig Estey
- Number of locations: 175

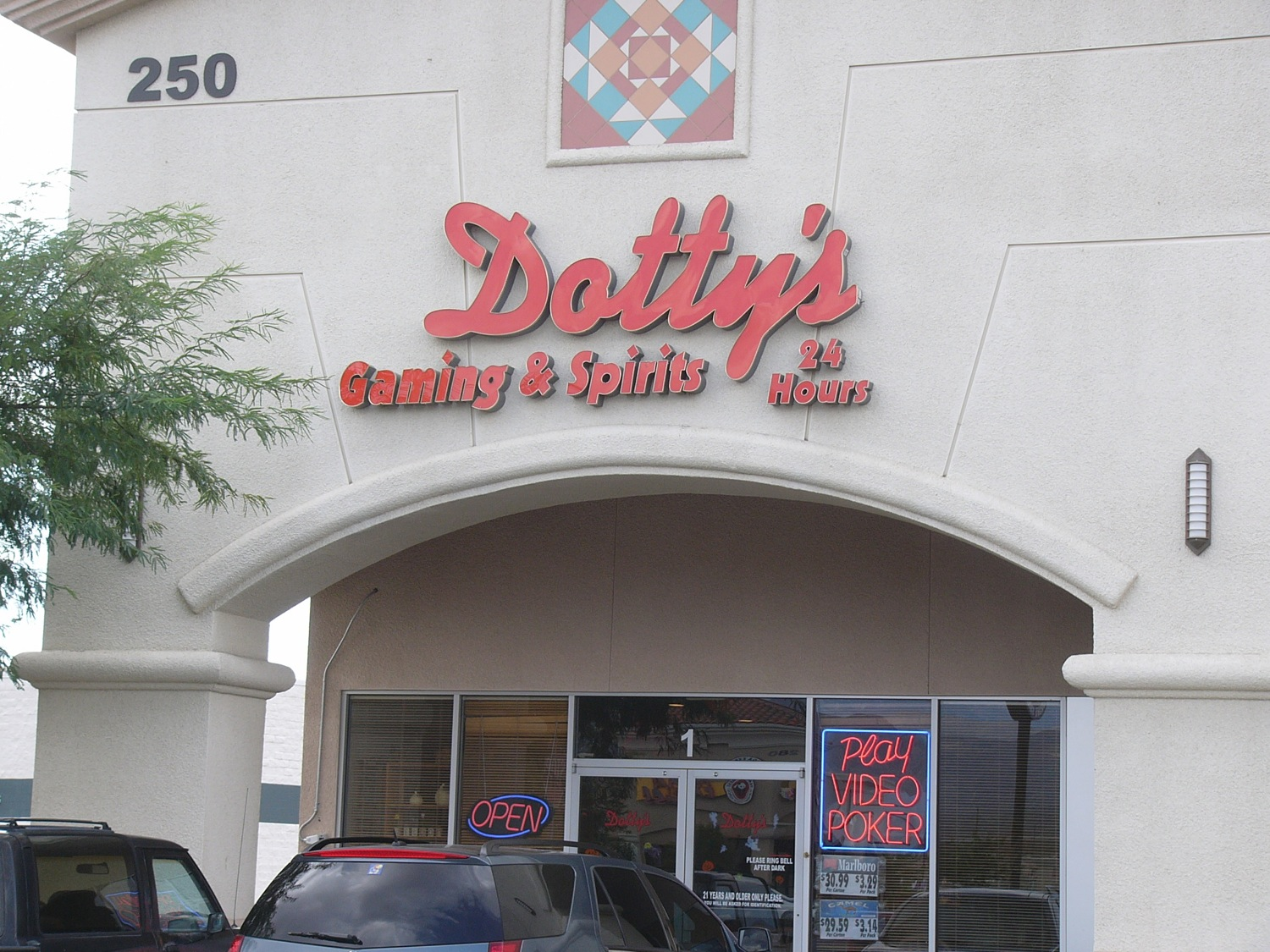
A Dotty's parlor in Pahrump, Nevada in 2008

Dotty's is a chain of slot machine parlors with about 175 locations in Nevada, Oregon and Montana and another 150 locations planned in Illinois. The business model is controversial, with sites "offering minimal food and beverage choices with a heavy focus on gambling." The chain has a clean, well-lit atmosphere meant to invoke "your grandmother's kitchen" and is demographically targeted towards women aged 35 and older.

== History ==
=== Oregon ===
The chain was founded in Oregon in 1991 by Craig Estey, whose family owned a major vending machine and food distribution service. The Oregon Legislature that year had authorized video poker machines to be installed in bars and taverns, under the aegis of the Oregon Lottery. The first poker machines began operation in March 1992, and by the next month, five Dotty's delis were open. The Oregon State Police, responsible for background checks on lottery retailers, objected to licensing the delis, arguing that they were not the type of business intended by the Legislature to have video poker, but its concerns were overruled by the lottery's director, Jim Davey.

In late 1993, when Dotty's sought to open its sixteenth outlet, Davey's successor, Dan Simmons, sought an opinion from the Attorney General as to whether he could deny the license on the basis that Dotty's was primarily a gambling business. A rule was instituted requiring a business to be at least a year old before becoming a lottery retailer, but Estey sued the state and was granted a waiver from this new requirement. Another rule was enacted requiring retailers to earn no more than two-thirds of their total income from the lottery, and a 1997 audit found that 21 of the 22 Dotty's outlets were in violation.

As of 2005, Dotty's had 26 locations in Oregon, and earned $6.4 million in lottery commissions.

In 2006, Estey came under investigation by the Lottery for alleged incidents of domestic violence against his wife, and for lying to Nevada gaming regulators about the incidents. Faced with the threat of losing Dotty's lottery retailer contract, Estey was forced to sell Dotty's locations in Oregon to a group of investors from South Dakota, including Dan Fischer and Marwin Hofer, at a sales price reportedly higher than $15 million. The new owners took possession in March 2007, with the Lottery itself agreeing to operate the stores on a temporary basis.

=== Nevada ===
Estey made his move into Nevada in 1995, gaining approval from the Nevada Gaming Commission for six Dotty's bars built along the model of the Oregon chain. By 2002, there were eight Dotty's locations in the state, and the chain was pushing into Northern Nevada with three planned locations in Reno and Carson City.

Opposition to Dotty's arose in 2010, led by locals casino operators Station Casinos and Boyd Gaming. Most Dotty's locations operate under a "restricted" gaming license, allowing up to 15 slot machines in a business such as a bar or convenience store, where gaming is "incidental" to the main business. Opponents argued that Dotty's violated this restriction, with gaming accounting for more than 90 percent of revenue at some locations.

Dotty's opponents were successful in April 2011, convincing the Clark County Commission to adopt rules that taverns with slot machines must have at least 2,500 square feet of space, at least eight bar-top slot machines, and a kitchen operating at least 12 hours a day, none of which would be satisfied by the typical Dotty's location. Similar restrictions were adopted months later at a statewide level by the Gaming Commission. By mid-2013, Dotty's was close to opening new locations with bar and restaurant facilities to comply with the stricter regulations, with the total number of locations in Nevada set to grow to 97.

In August 2013, Dotty's agreed to acquire the Hacienda Hotel and Casino near Boulder City, its first full hotel-casino. In July 2014, Dotty's agreed to buy the River Palms in Laughlin.

=== Illinois ===
Illinois began video gambling operations in October 2012, with bars allowed to install as many as five slot machines. Dotty's soon made its move into the state, announcing plans to open 150 Dotty's Cafes, mostly in strip malls in the suburbs of Chicago.
