= List of casinos in Louisiana =

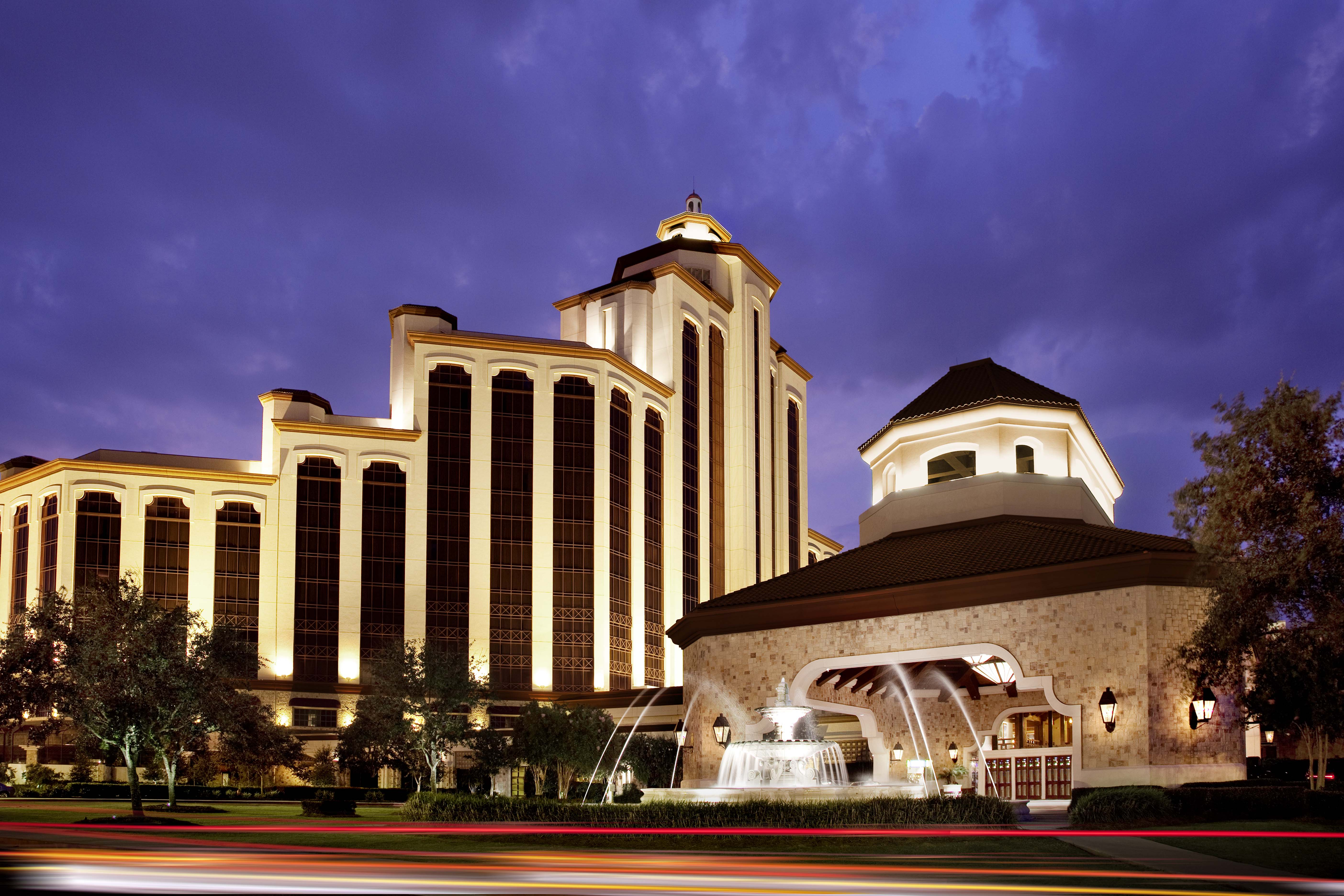
L'Auberge Casino Resort

This is a list of casinos in the U.S. state of Louisiana.

== List of casinos ==
List of casinos in the U.S. state of Louisiana
Casino	City	Parish	State	District	Type	Comments
Amelia Belle	Amelia	St. Mary	Louisiana		Riverboat	Formerly Bally's, Belle of Orleans.
Bally's Baton Rouge	Baton Rouge	East Baton Rouge	Louisiana		Riverboat	Formerly Argosy Casino, Belle of Baton Rouge
Bally's Shreveport	Shreveport	Caddo	Louisiana		Riverboat	Formerly Hollywood Casino, Eldorado Casino
Boomtown Bossier City	Bossier City	Bossier	Louisiana		Riverboat	Formerly Casino Magic.
Boomtown New Orleans	Harvey	Jefferson	Louisiana		Riverboat
Coushatta Casino Resort	Kinder	Allen	Louisiana		Native American	Formerly Grand Casino Coushatta.
Cypress Bayou Casino	Charenton	St. Mary	Louisiana		Native American
Delta Downs	Vinton	Calcasieu	Louisiana		Racino
Diamond Jacks Casino Bossier City	Bossier City	Bossier	Louisiana		Riverboat	Formerly Isle of Capri. Closed; Re-opening 2024.
Evangeline Downs	Opelousas	St. Landry	Louisiana		Racino
Fair Grounds Race Course	New Orleans	Orleans	Louisiana		Racino
Flamingo Casino New Orleans	New Orleans	Orleans	Louisiana		Riverboat	Closed 1997.
Golden Nugget Lake Charles	Lake Charles	Calcasieu	Louisiana		Riverboat
Harrah's Lake Charles	Lake Charles	Calcasieu	Louisiana		Riverboat	Closed 2005. Formerly Players Island.
Caesars New Orleans	New Orleans	Orleans	Louisiana		Land-based
Horseshoe Bossier City	Bossier City	Bossier	Louisiana		Riverboat
Horseshoe Lake Charles	Westlake	Calcasieu	Louisiana		Riverboat
Jena Choctaw Pines Casino	Dry Prong	Grant	Louisiana		Native American
L'Auberge Casino Resort Lake Charles	Lake Charles	Calcasieu	Louisiana		Riverboat
L'Auberge Casino Baton Rouge	Baton Rouge	East Baton Rouge	Louisiana		Riverboat
Louisiana Downs	Bossier City	Bossier	Louisiana		Racino
Margaritaville Resort Casino	Bossier City	Bossier	Louisiana		Riverboat
Paragon Casino Resort	Marksville	Avoyelles	Louisiana		Native American	Formerly Grand Casino Avoyelles.
The Queen Baton Rouge	Baton Rouge	East Baton Rouge	Louisiana		Riverboat	Formerly Hollywood Casino Baton Rouge.
River City Casino	New Orleans	Orleans	Louisiana		Riverboat	Closed 1995.
Sam's Town Shreveport	Shreveport	Caddo	Louisiana		Riverboat	Formerly Harrah's.
Showboat Star Casino	New Orleans	Orleans	Louisiana		Riverboat	Closed 1995.
Treasure Chest Casino	Kenner	Jefferson	Louisiana		Riverboat

== Slot Payback Percentages ==
Louisiana Slot Machine Payback Statistics
	BR	LC	NO	SB
1¢	88.70%	88.57%	88.96%	89.01%
5¢	91.69%	94.31%	93.31%	93.12%
25¢	92.30%	93.08%	92.43%	90.73%
$1	93.56%	92.33%	92.72%	93.03%
$5	94.49%	92.99%	92.93%	92.70%
All	90.50%	90.63%	90.23%	90.43%

Slot payback percentages are acquired yearly from American Casino Guide Book. Louisiana state gaming laws require that casino machines must payback a minimum of 80% and a maximum of 99.9%.

== Gallery ==
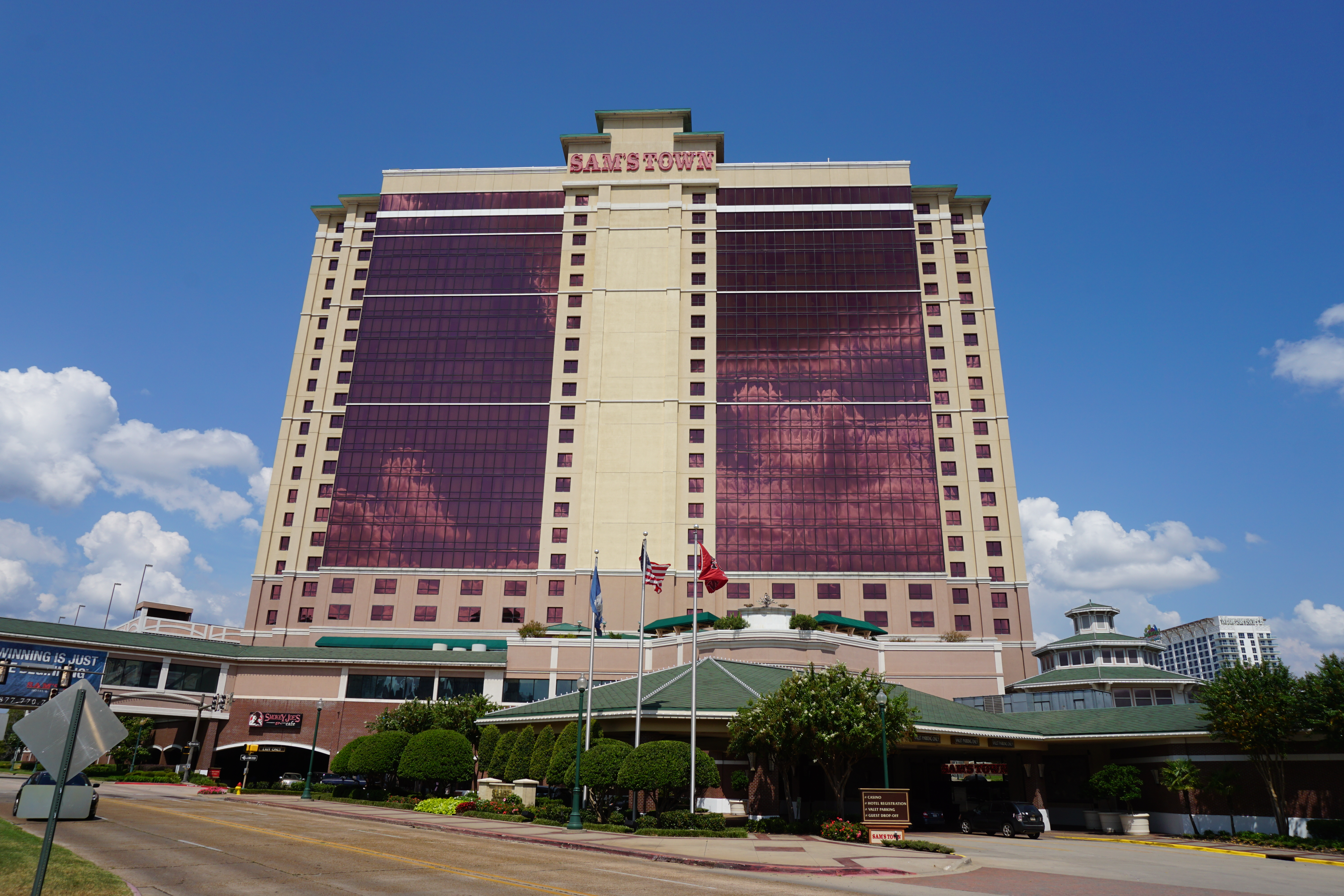
Sam's Town Hotel and Gambling Hall

== See also ==
- List of casinos in the United States
- List of casino hotels
