= Hoover Dam Lodge =

Hotel and casino in Boulder City, Nevada, United States

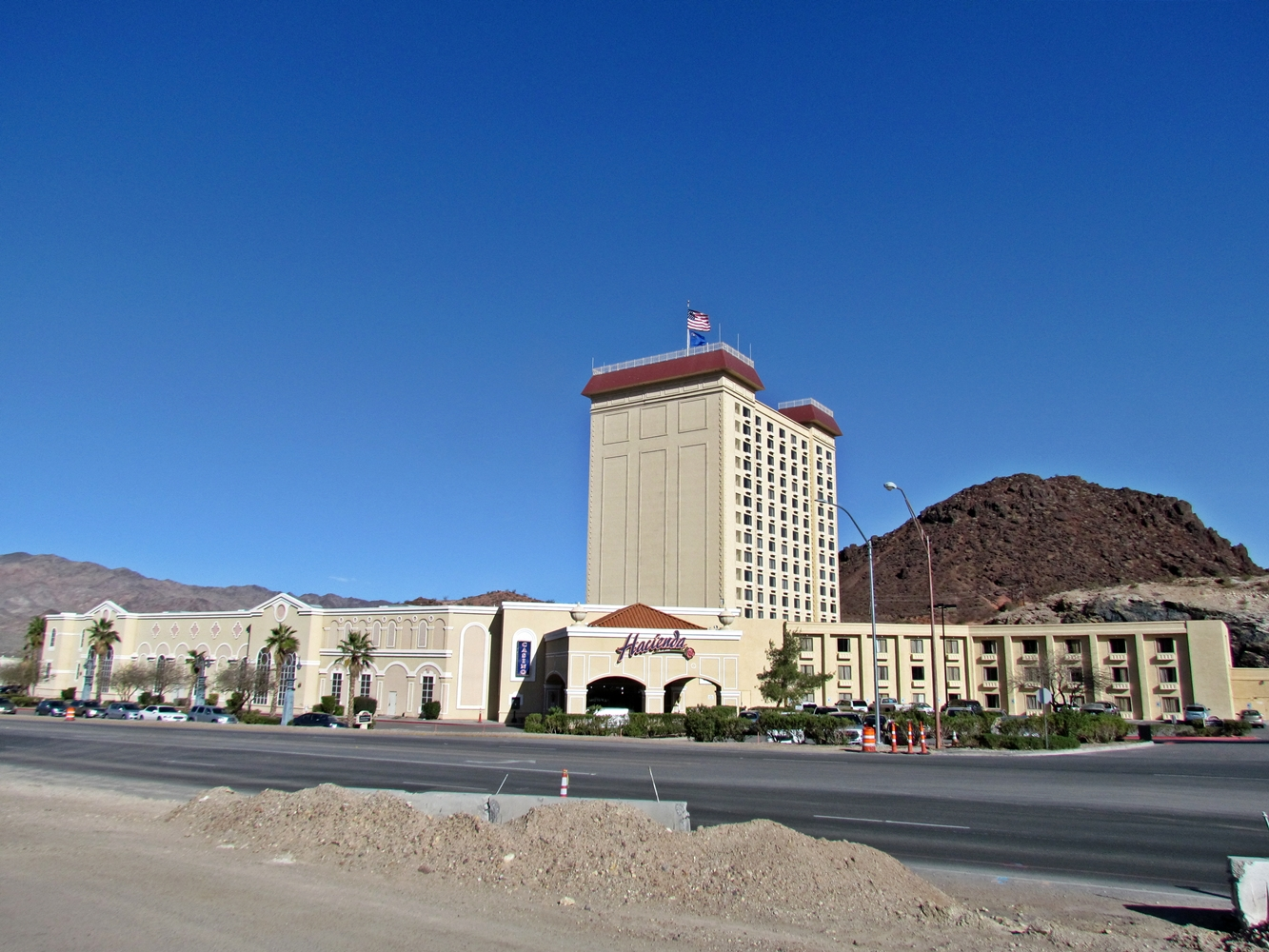
- Hacienda in 2012
- Interactive map of Hoover Dam Lodge
- Location: Boulder City, Nevada, U.S.; U.S. Route 93 Business; 36.00998°N 114.78486°W
- Opened: May 1958; 68 years ago
- Theme: Rustic lodge
- No. of rooms: 372
- Gaming space: 20,782 sq ft (1,930.7 m^{2})
- Owner: Richard Craig Estey (Nevada Restaurant Services)
- Previous names: Gold Strike (1958–1998); Hacienda (1999–2015)
- Website: hooverdamlodge.com

Hoover Dam Lodge is a hotel and casino near Boulder City, Nevada. It is owned and operated by Richard Craig Estey (Nevada Restaurant Services). It was previously the Gold Strike until it was largely destroyed by an accidental fire on June 16, 1998. It reopened the next year as the Hacienda and then took on its current name in January 2015.

The hotel is located on a parcel of private land surrounded by Lake Mead National Recreation Area, three miles from Hoover Dam. It overlooks Lake Mead and has a 17-story tower with 372 rooms.

The 20,782 square feet (1,930.7 m^{2}) casino has 154 slot machines and a race and sports book operated by William Hill.

== History ==
=== Gold Strike ===
The property was originally a patented mining claim owned by Las Vegas real estate developer Patrick Sullivan, who was seeking gold and turquoise. It became known as Sullivan's Gulch. In the 1920s, the Bureau of Reclamation withdrew over a million acres of land for the creation of Hoover Dam and Lake Mead, but overlooked Sullivan's land. The National Park Service (NPS) made attempts to buy the land as early as 1936.

In 1954, Sullivan's heirs sold the property for $20,000 to Boulder City businessman Don Belding, his business partner, O. L. Raney, and Jack Richardson. They saw an opportunity to service drivers going to and from the dam, and little competition because Boulder City prohibited gambling. They opened the Gold Strike Inn in May 1958 with a snack bar, gift shop, cocktail lounge, service station, and six slot machines.

In the 1960s, the partners leased the site to a developer that hoped to expand it as an Old West theme park. The name was changed to Fort Lucinda and attractions such as llama rides, a wax museum, and a 3 ft (914 mm) narrow gauge railroad were added. A "ghost town" consisting of buildings from various northern Nevada towns was moved to the property from the New Frontier casino. The project was killed by financing and water supply problems, control reverted to Belding, Raney, and Richardson, and the Gold Strike name returned.

The NPS tried again to acquire the land in 1964, prior to the creation of Lake Mead National Recreation Area. A court settlement was eventually reached in 1973, with the government buying 87 undeveloped acres of the property and agreeing not to discuss any further sale unless first approached by the Gold Strike's owners.

In 1977, Belding and Richardson sold their shares to their sons, Dave and Bill, and Raney sold his interest to Circus Circus executive Mike Ensign. An 80-room hotel was opened in 1982, with another 80 rooms added in 1986, and a 16-story hotel tower in 1994.

On June 16, 1998, an accidental fire started by a construction worker destroyed the Gold Strike casino, while leaving the hotel tower mostly undamaged.

=== Hacienda ===
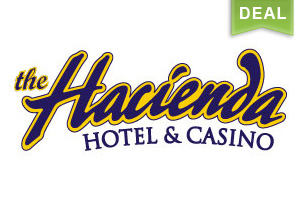
Hacienda logo (1999–2015)

The property was reopened in November 1999, at a cost of $30 million. A name change had already been planned, because the Gold Strike name had been sold to Circus Circus, so the property was renamed as the Hacienda. The Gold Strike name was retained for a property in Jean, Nevada, as part of a larger entity, Gold Strike Resorts. The Hacienda name was itself licensed from Circus Circus, which had owned the demolished Hacienda casino on the Las Vegas Strip.

After several developers showed interest in buying the property to build a residential neighborhood or high-rise timeshare tower, the owners approached the NPS in 2003 with their willingness to consider an offer. The Secretary of Interior allocated up to $20 million for a purchase. The NPS hoped to tear down the tower, which they considered an "eyesore", and build a visitors center, offices, or a training center. The owners ultimately decided not to sell the Hacienda because they were uncertain about their ability to find new jobs for the employees if the property were to close.

In December 2013, Nevada Restaurant Services, parent company of the statewide chain of Dotty's slot parlors, purchased the Hacienda. The company announced plans to renovate the property and build a new gas station and convenience store.

=== Hoover Dam Lodge ===
The property was renamed to Hoover Dam Lodge in January 2015.
