= Regions Tower =

High-rise building in Shreveport, Louisiana, US

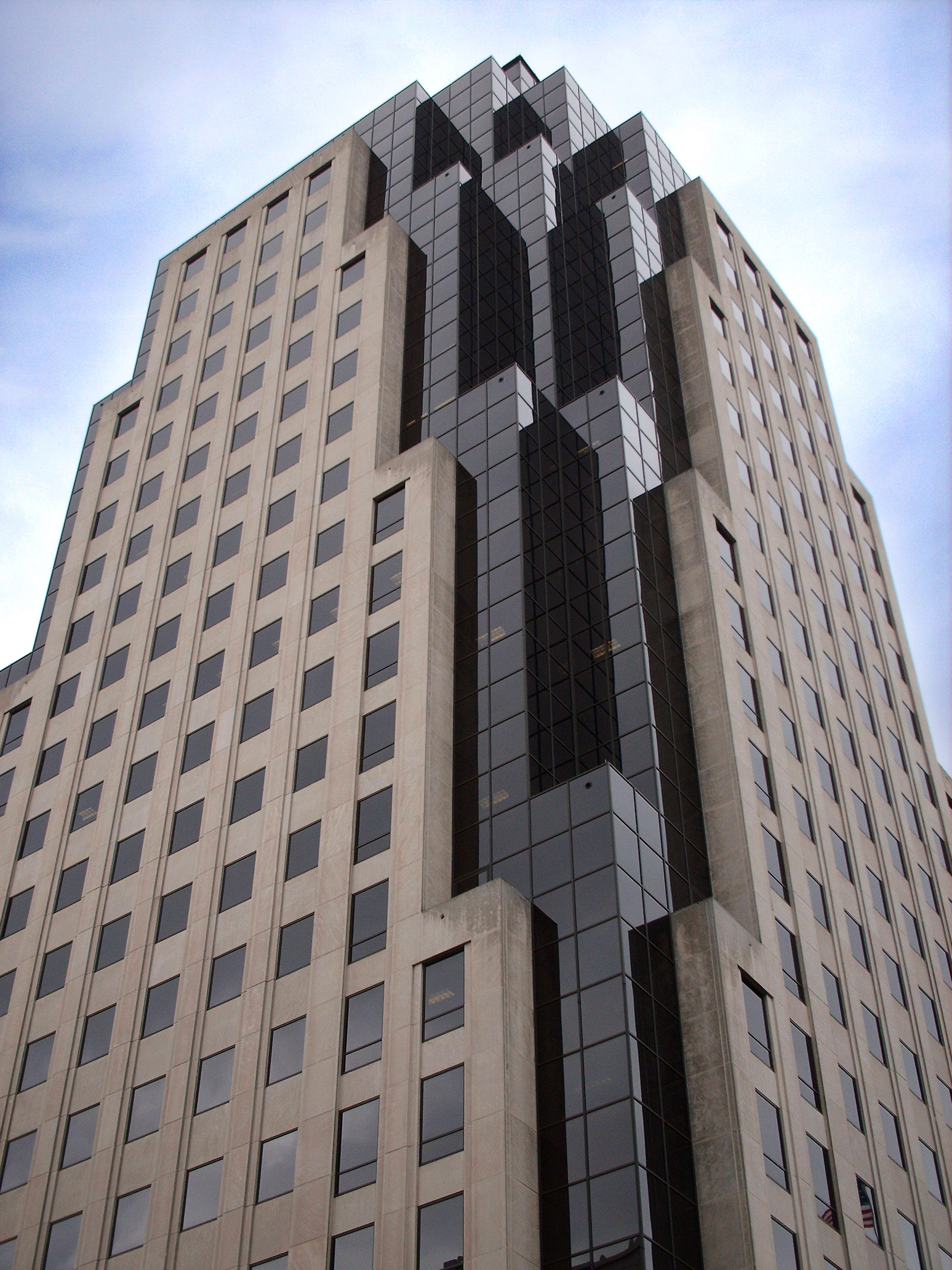
- Regions Tower is the tallest high-rise in Downtown Shreveport and northern Louisiana
- Interactive map of the Regions Tower area
- Former names: AmSouth Tower

General information
- Type: Office building
- Location: 333 Texas St, Shreveport, Louisiana, United States
- Coordinates: 32.513742°N 93.747717°W
- Completed: 1986

Height
- Height: 364.17 ft (111.00 m)

Technical details
- Floor count: 25

Design and construction
- Architects: HKS, Inc.

The Regions Tower (Regions Bank), formerly AmSouth Tower and before that the Commercial National Bank tower, is a high-rise in Shreveport, Louisiana in the United States. Standing 365 feet (111 meters) tall and containing 25 floors, it is the tallest building in northern Louisiana. It was built in 1986 as the CNB Tower, adjacent to the bank's older building and connected to it by a common lobby. It is currently owned by Plaza Investments II, LLC and managed by Sealy & Company, Inc. of Shreveport. Facilities include a café and concessions, a shoe shine service, and a fitness facility for tenants only. It also includes a conference facility that seats up to 200.

== See also ==
- Beck Building
- List of tallest buildings in Shreveport
