= Sam's Town Hotel and Gambling Hall, Tunica =

American hotel and casino

Coordinates: 34.8191°N 90.4118°W

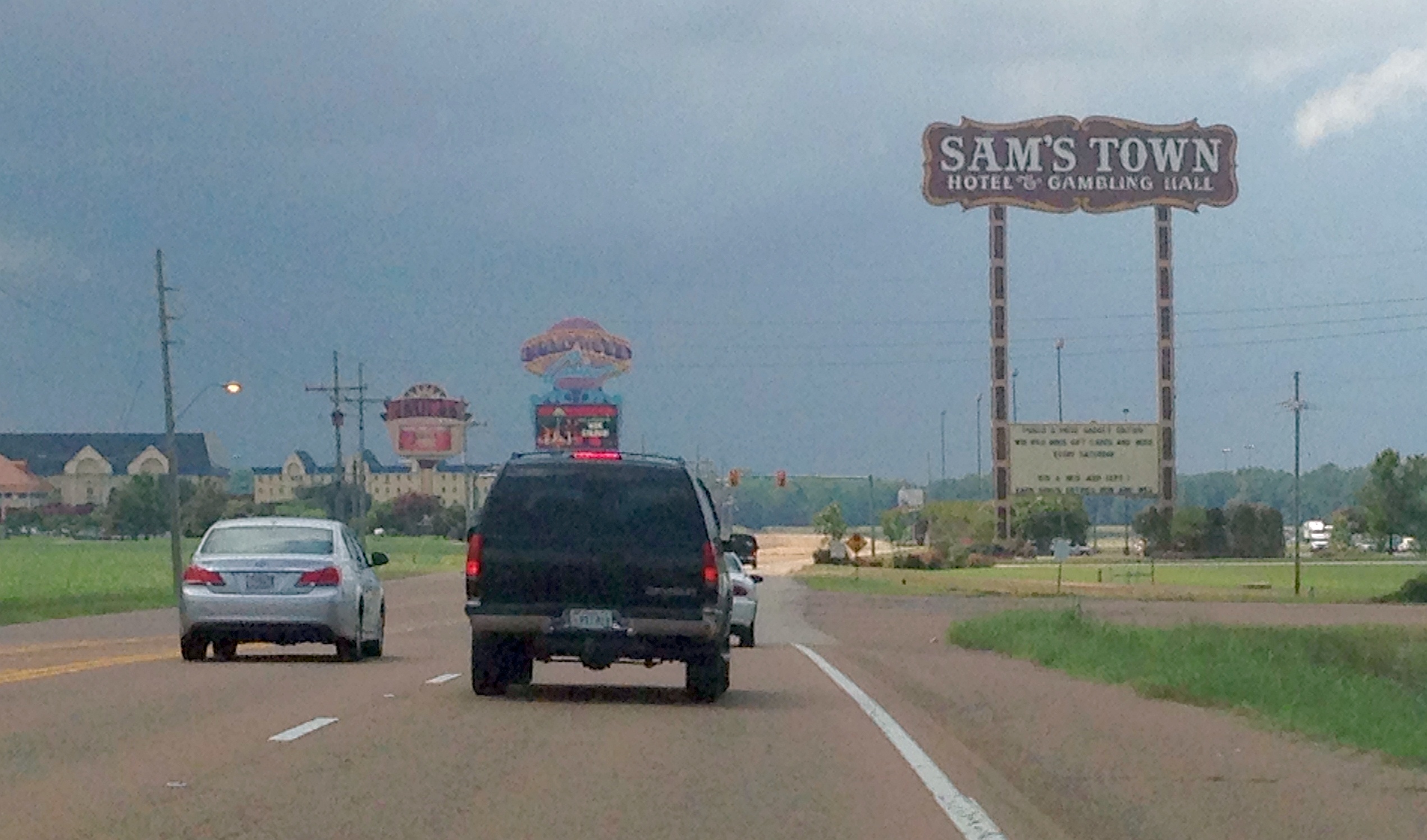
- Interactive map of Sam's Town Hotel and Gambling Hall
- Location: Robinsonville, Mississippi 38664; 1477 Casino Strip Resorts Boulevard
- Opened: May 25, 1994
- Closed: November 9, 2025
- No. of rooms: 1,070
- Gaming space: 96,000 sq ft (8,900 m^{2})
- Signature attractions: Sam's Town 250 NASCAR Busch Series race
- Casino type: Riverboat casino
- Owner: Boyd Gaming Corporation
- Website: Sam's Town Hotel and Gambling Hall

Sam's Town Hotel and Gambling Hall was a hotel and casino located in Tunica Resorts, Mississippi, United States. The resort was owned and operated by Boyd Gaming under the Sam's Town Hotel and Gambling Hall brand and resembled its Nevada sibling, except for the atrium.

The facility was officially a riverboat casino because the gaming area was situated on a building built on barges that floated in a pool of water linked to the nearby Mississippi River, as required by state law. It included a 1,600 seat showroom, a 1,070-room hotel, and an RV park. The casino permanently closed on November 9, 2025, due to market conditions.

== History ==
The facility was opened on May 25, 1994, by Boyd Gaming as the third casino branded as Sam's Town (Note: Sam's Town Las Vegas opened in 1979; the second Sam's Town was operated by Boyd in Laughlin, Nevada, from 1984 to 1991, and later became Laughlin River Lodge.) and the first casino opened by Boyd outside of Nevada. It was built to replicate a Western town; at the time it opened it was 400,000 square feet (37,000 m^{2}) in size with a 200-room hotel.

In 2002, Boyd bought an adjacent hotel and theater owned by Isle of Capri Casinos for $7.5 million. Sam's Town expanded into the property, adding an additional hotel tower and parking garage. As of November 2020, Sam's Town has over 700 hotel rooms in Tunica.

From 1999 to 2007, Boyd sponsored the Sam's Town 250, a NASCAR Busch Series race at nearby Memphis International Raceway.

During the COVID-19 pandemic in 2020, the hotel and casino were closed from March until May, along with multiple other hotels and casinos in the area.
