= Craig Estey =

American businessman

Chairman of Nevada Restaurant Services, Inc.

Personal details
- Born: Richard Craig Estey Oregon, U.S.
- Children: 3
- Occupation: Gaming and Entertainment Entrepreneur

Dotty's logo

Richard Craig Estey is an American businessman, political donor and philanthropist. He is the founder and chairman of Nevada Restaurant Services, Inc. parent company to Dotty's, Bourbon Street, Hoover Dam Lodge, Laughlin River Lodge, La Villita, and Red Dragon an enterprise of taverns, hotels, and casinos with locations in Nevada and Montana. Nevada Restaurant Services, Inc. maintains the largest slot route in Nevada.

== Career ==
=== Gaming History ===
The chain was founded in Oregon in 1991 by Craig Estey, whose family owned a successful vending machine and food distribution service. The Oregon Legislature that year had authorized video poker machines to be installed in bars and taverns, under the aegis of the Oregon Lottery. The first poker machines began operation in March 1992, and by the next month, five Dotty's delis were open.

=== Dotty's ===
Dotty's is a 24-hour cafe with a local forward business model, "offering food and beverage choices, with a focus on players having a welcoming environment." The chain has a clean, well-lit atmosphere meant to invoke "your grandmother's kitchen" and is demographically targeted towards women aged 35 and older.

=== Hoover Dam Lodge ===
"The owner of the chain Dotty's storefront taverns (in an interview) says he's bought a landmark hotel off U.S. 93 near Hoover Dam and Lake Mead. Nevada Restaurant Services Inc. chief Craig Estey released a statement Tuesday confirming his purchase of the Hacienda Hotel & Casino from the Lakeview Co. Estey calls the Hacienda a "historical jewel."" - August 7, 2013. Hoover Dam Lodge is a 280-room hotel and casino. Hoover Dam Lodge has three restaurants - Big Horn Cafe, Dotty's a 24-hour cafe, and La Villita.

=== Laughlin River Lodge ===
The Laughlin River Lodge (formerly Sam's Town Gold River, Gold River and River Palms) is a hotel and casino on the banks of the Colorado River in Laughlin, Nevada. It is owned and operated by Richard Craig Estey (Nevada Restaurant Services). The property includes an expansive casino floor and 1,000 hotel rooms in a 25-story tower. The resort has 653 slot machines and a bingo parlor.

== Philanthropy ==
Mr. and Mrs. Craig Estey are supporters of the American Heart Association.

- American Heart Association
