= Hollywood Casino Corp. =

Defunct American gaming company

- Industry: Private
- Founded: 1990s
- Founder: Pratt family (of the Sands Atlantic City
- Defunct: 2003
- Fate: Acquired by Penn National Gaming
- Headquarters: Dallas, Texas, U.S.
- Number of locations: 4 casinos (2000)

Hollywood Casino Corp. was a gaming company based in Dallas, Texas. It was acquired in 2003 by Penn National Gaming for $328 million plus $360 million in assumed debt.

In the early 1990s, as legalized gambling spread to new states, the Pratts, owners of Sands Atlantic City, established Hollywood Casino Corp. to develop new casinos under the Hollywood Casino name. At the time of its initial public offering in 1993, HWCC owned an 80 percent stake in Pratt Hotel.

The company made its initial public offering in May 1993. Its first riverboat casino opened in Aurora, Illinois the next month. In January 1994, Hollywood acquired a casino being built in Tunica County, Mississippi from Summit Casinos for $15 million, and it opened in August. A casino in Shreveport, Louisiana was opened in December 2000.

== List of properties ==
- Hollywood Casino Aurora – Aurora, Illinois
- Hollywood Casino Shreveport – Shreveport, Louisiana
- Hollywood Casino Tunica – Tunica Resorts, Mississippi
- Sands Atlantic City – Atlantic City, New Jersey (80 percent ownership through Pratt Hotel Corp.)
