= Sam's Town Hotel and Gambling Hall =

American casino brand name

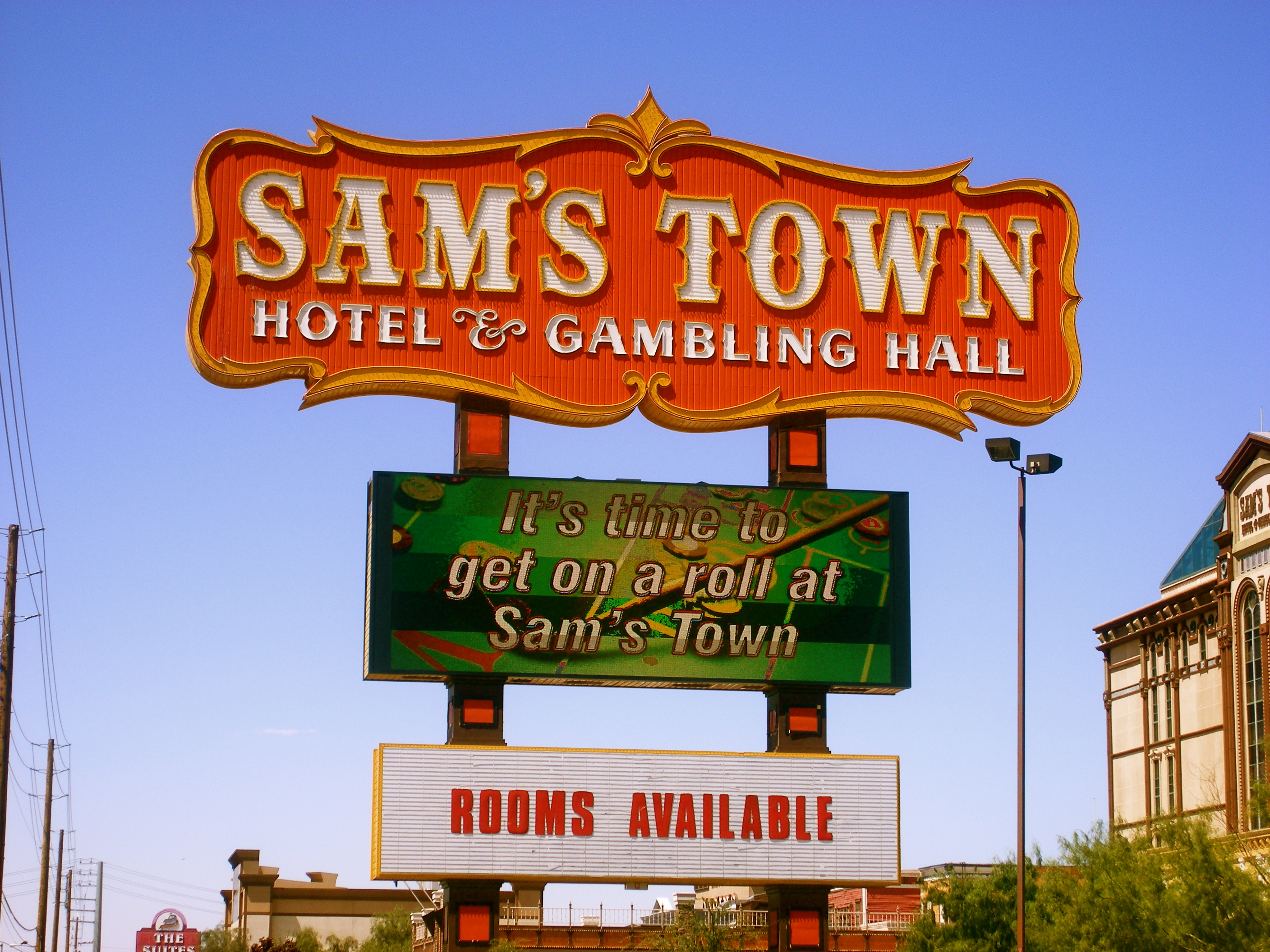
- Sam's Town in the Las Vegas Valley
- Product type: Hotel and casino
- Current owner: Boyd Gaming
- Country: United States
- Introduced: 1979; 47 years ago
- Markets: Las Vegas Valley, Nevada; Greater Shreveport, Louisiana
- Website: www.samstown.com

Sam's Town Hotel and Gambling Hall, commonly shortened to Sam's Town, is a casino brand owned by Boyd Gaming, named after its founder, Sam Boyd (1910–1993). Five properties have carried the Sam's Town name; two remain owned and operated by Boyd Gaming.

== History ==
The first Sam's Town opened in the Las Vegas Valley in Sunrise Manor, Nevada, on April 1, 1979. Branded as Sam's Town Hotel and Gambling Hall, Las Vegas, it has undergone several expansions, including an 18-screen theatre added in 2000. As of November 2020, the facility included 645 hotel rooms.

The second Sam's Town opened in 1984 in Laughlin, Nevada. Originally branded as Sam's Town Gold River, it was later shortened to Gold River and was operated by Boyd Gaming until March 1991. Since then, the facility has changed names and owners, most recently operating as Laughlin River Lodge.

The third Sam's Town opened in 1994 in Tunica Resorts, Mississippi. It was expanded after Boyd Gaming bought an adjacent property in 2002. Branded as Sam's Town Hotel and Gambling Hall, Tunica, as of November 2020 it had over 700 hotel rooms. This facility closed in 2025.

The fourth Sam's Town was a riverboat casino that operated in Kansas City, Missouri, from September 1995 until July 1998. It was branded as Sam's Town Gambling Hall, Kansas City.

The fifth Sam's Town opened in May 2004 after Boyd Gaming acquired an existing property in Shreveport, Louisiana, from Harrah's Entertainment. Branded as Sam's Town Hotel and Gambling Hall, Shreveport, as of November 2020 it had over 500 hotel rooms.

Sam's Town properties
Location	Name	Operated	Notes
Sunrise Manor, Nevada	Sam's Town Hotel and Gambling Hall, Las Vegas	1979–present	645 hotel rooms
Laughlin, Nevada	Sam's Town Gold River	1984–1991	now Laughlin River Lodge
Tunica Resorts, Mississippi	Sam's Town Hotel and Gambling Hall, Tunica	1994–2025	riverboat casino
Kansas City, Missouri	Sam's Town Gambling Hall, Kansas City	1995–1998	riverboat casino
Shreveport, Louisiana	Sam's Town Hotel and Gambling Hall, Shreveport	2004–present	500+ hotel rooms

== Sponsorship ==
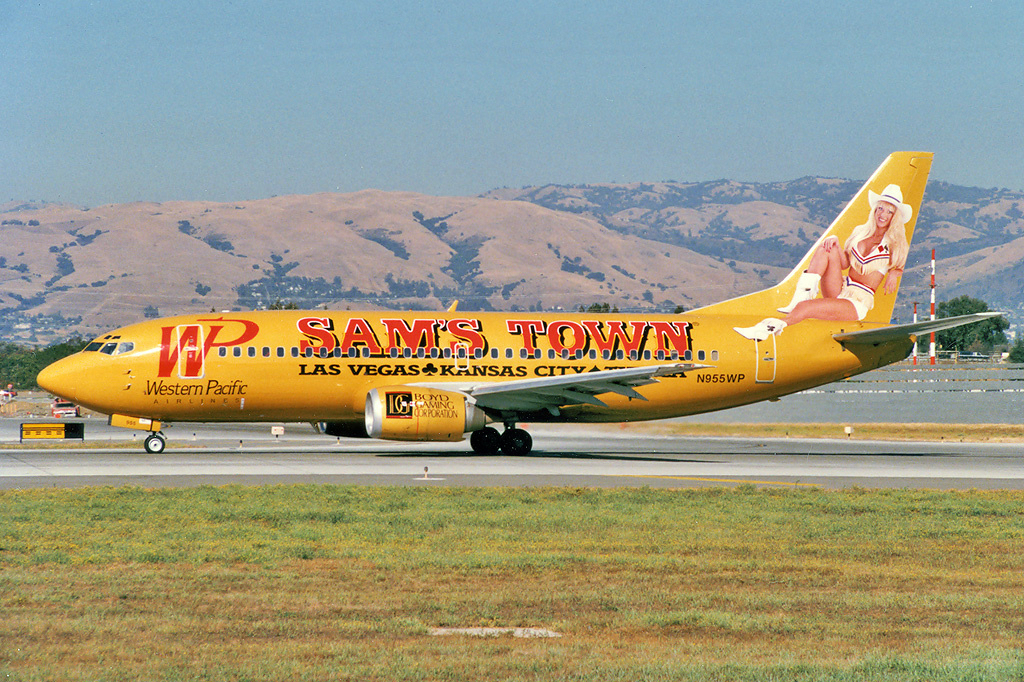
Western Pacific Airlines jet painted in the Sam's Town color scheme

Boyd Gaming has sponsored several NASCAR races with Sam's Town branding. In the NASCAR Craftsman Truck Series, the Sam's Town 250 was held at Las Vegas Motor Speedway in 1998, and the Sam's Town 400 was held at Texas Motor Speedway from 2006 to 2008. In the NASCAR Busch Series, the Sam's Town 300 was held at Las Vegas Motor Speedway from 1998 to 2013, and the Sam's Town 250 was held at Memphis International Raceway from 1999 to 2007.

In ten-pin bowling, the Sam's Town Invitational was an event on the Ladies Pro Bowlers Tour (now the Professional Women's Bowling Association) from 1979 into the 1990s.

In the mid-1990s, a Boeing 737-300 operated by Western Pacific Airlines, tail number N955WP, was painted in the Sam's Town color scheme, also listing its casino locations at the time (Las Vegas, Kansas City, Tunica).

== See also ==
- Sam's Town, a 2006 album by the Killers, named after the brand's Las Vegas-area casino
