= Bally's Shreveport =

Casino hotel in Shreveport, Louisiana

Bally's Shreveport Casino & Hotel
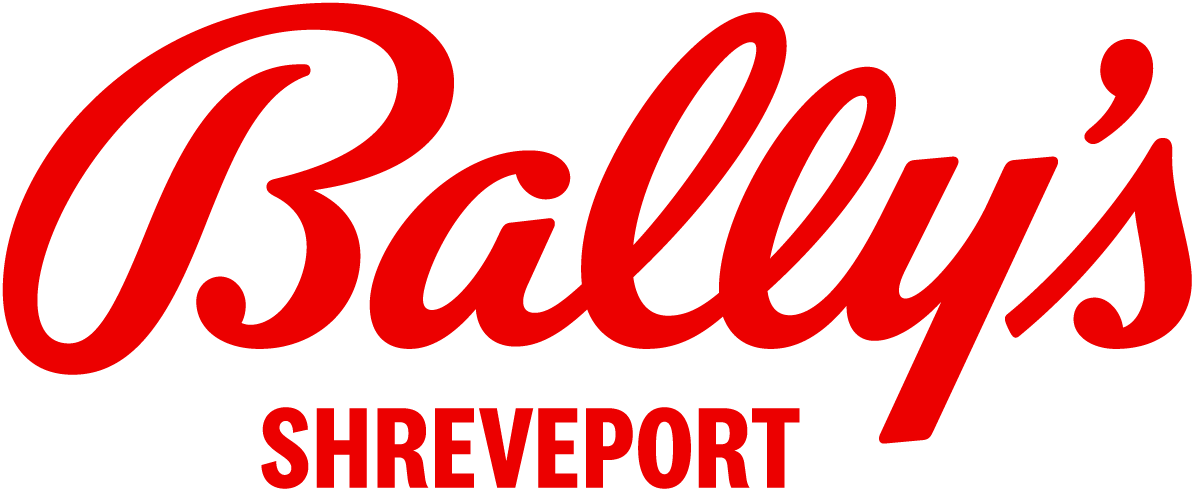

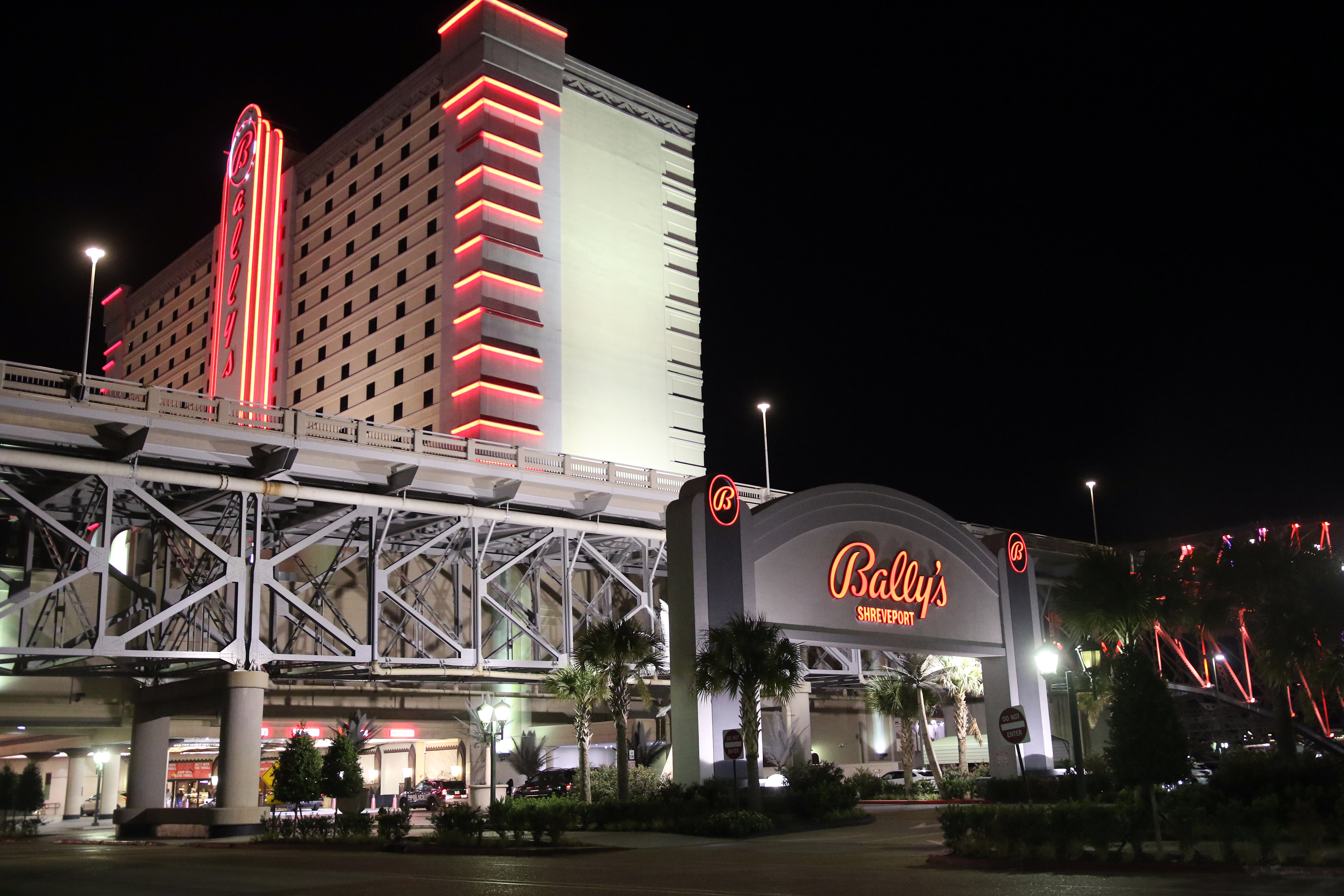
- Bally's Hotel & Casino on September 7, 2023
- Interactive map of Bally's Shreveport Casino & Hotel
- Location: Shreveport, Louisiana; 451 Clyde Fant Pkwy; 32.5174098°N 93.744382°W
- Opened: December 20, 2000
- Gaming space: 30,000 square feet (2,800 m^{2})
- Casino type: Riverboat
- Owner: Gaming and Leisure Properties
- Operating license holder: Bally's Corporation
- Previous names: Hollywood Casino Shreveport (2000-2004); Eldorado Shreveport (2005-2021)
- Website: casinos.ballys.com/shreveport/

Bally's Shreveport Casino & Hotel is a casino hotel in Shreveport, Louisiana. It is owned by Gaming and Leisure Properties and operated by Bally's Corporation.

The casino has over 1,100 slot machines and 50 live-action table games. The hotel has 403 rooms and in an 18-story tower.

== History ==
The casino hotel opened as Hollywood Casino Shreveport in December 2000 as the fifth riverboat casino in the Shreveport-Bossier City market. The casino, at its opening, featured a 30,000 square foot casino with a 14 floor hotel and multiple restaurants. It cost $230 million to construct and was originally owned Hollywood Casino Corporation.

In 2004, Hollywood Casino Corporation filed for bankruptcy. In 2005, the casino was bought by Eldorado Resorts, Inc., now Caesars Entertainment, Inc., for $154 million. After being purchased, the casino underwent renovations. A few months later, it was rebranded as Eldorado Resort Casino Shreveport.

On April 24, 2020, Twin River Worldwide Holdings, now Bally's Corporation, announced its intention to purchase Eldorado Resort Casino Shreveport and other Caesars Entertainment properties. In December 2020, Bally's Corporation completed its acquisition of the property for $165 million. In November 2021, the casino resort was renamed to its current name, Bally's Shreveport Casino & Hotel.

Bally's sold the land and buildings of Bally's Shreveport in 2024 to Gaming and Leisure Properties for $120 million in a sale-and-leaseback deal.

In February 2026, Bally's Corporation came to an agreement to purchase neighboring Sam's Town Shreveport from Boyd Gaming Corporation. The acquisition is set be completed in the third quarter of 2026.

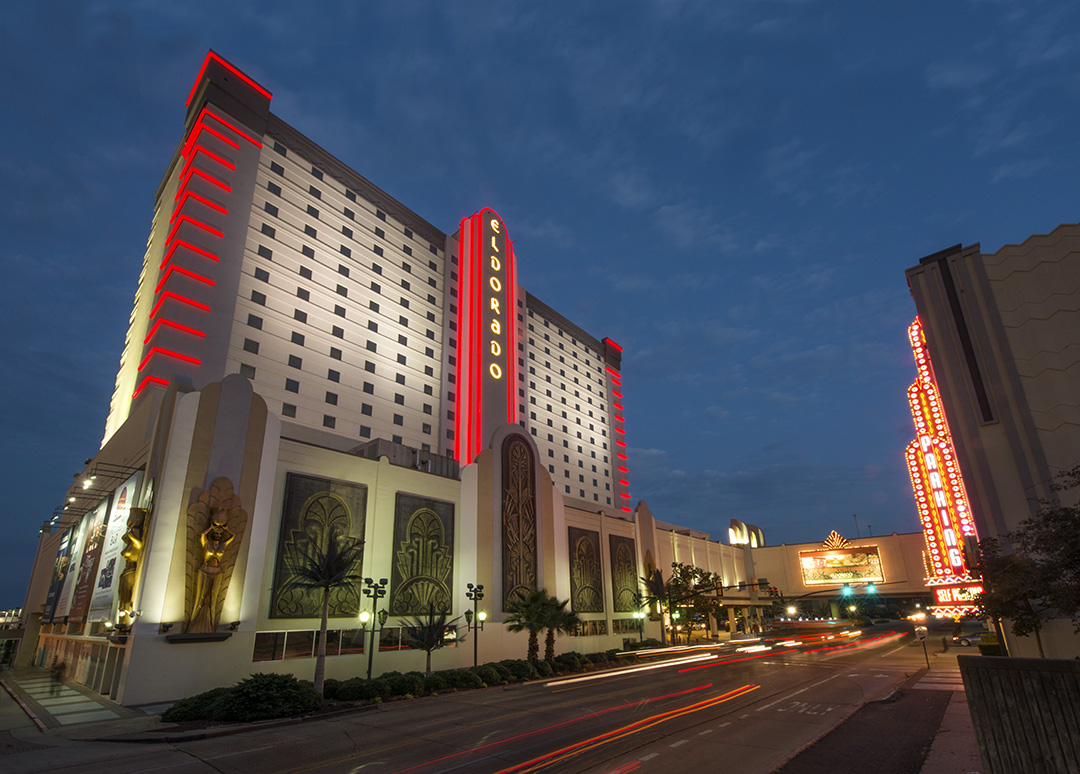
Eldorado Casino & Resort on November 4, 2015

== See also ==
- List of casinos in Louisiana
