= Sam's Town Gambling Hall, Kansas City =

American casino

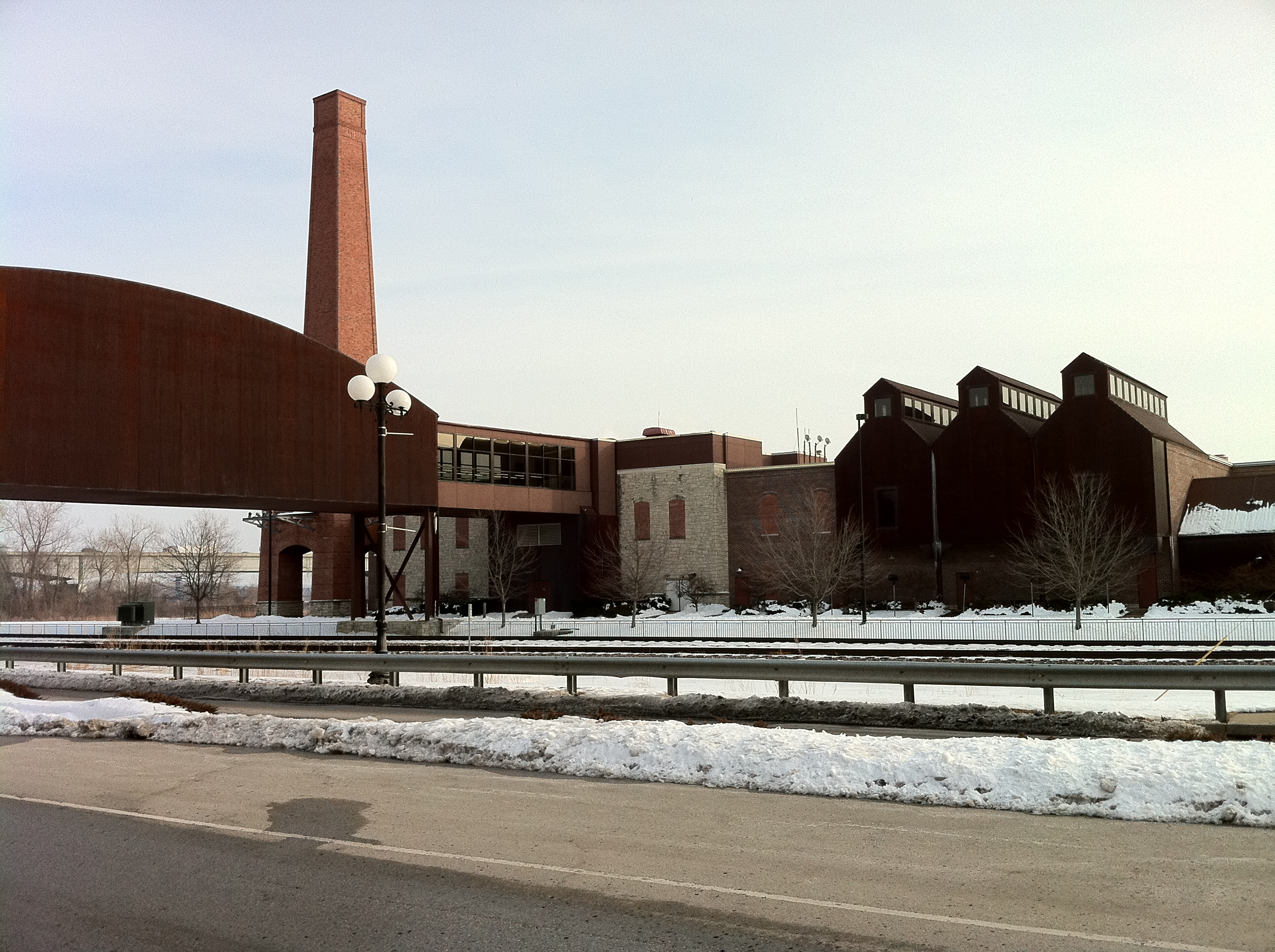
- Interactive map of Sam's Town Gambling Hall
- Location: 6711 NE Birmingham Rd, Kansas City, MO 64117; 39.1540°N 94.5023°W
- Opened: September 1995
- Closed: July 1998
- Gaming space: 28,000 sq ft (2,600 m^{2})
- Casino type: Riverboat casino
- Owner: Boyd Gaming

Sam's Town Gambling Hall, Kansas City was a riverboat casino that operated in the mid-1990s in Kansas City, Missouri, docked near the intersection of Interstate 435 and Missouri Route 210. It was owned and operated by Boyd Gaming under the Sam's Town Hotel and Gambling Hall brand.

== History ==
In September 1995, Sam's Town Gambling Hall, Kansas City opened as the fourth casino under the brand, and the fifth casino in the Kansas City area.

In February 1996, Sam's Town dropped the admission fee that had run as high as $9 per person. This fee was used in the past to pay for the $2 per person fee the casinos were required to pay to the state.

After poor results, Boyd closed this location in July 1998, selling many of its assets to Harrah's Entertainment for $12.5 million. The boat is no longer docked at the property, which is now owned and maintained by Cerner Corporation as their Riverport campus. In 2021, Cerner Corporation listed the property through Colliers International without a listed asking price.
