= Laughlin River Lodge =

Casino hotel in Nevada, United States

Coordinates: 35.150563°N 114.574844°W

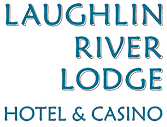

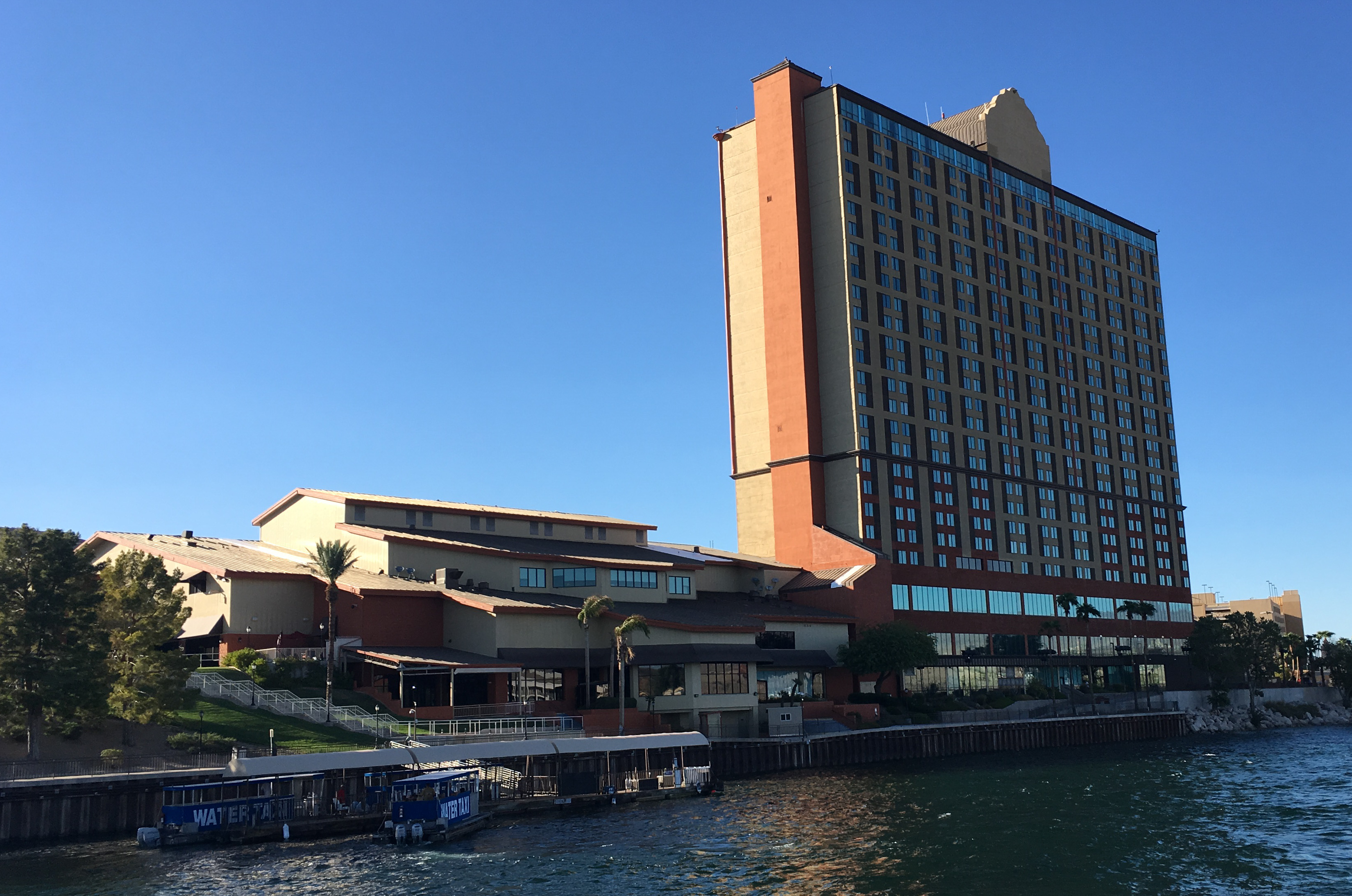
- The property as seen from the Colorado River in 2018
- Interactive map of Laughlin River Lodge
- Location: Laughlin, Nevada, U.S.; 2700 South Casino Drive
- Opened: 1984; 42 years ago
- Theme: Rustic lodge
- No. of rooms: 1,000
- Gaming space: 41,000 sq ft (3,800 m^{2})
- Notable restaurants: None
- Owner: Richard Craig Estey (Nevada Restaurant Services)
- Previous names: Sam's Town Gold River (1984–1991); Gold River (1991–1998); River Palms (1998–2014)
- Renovated in: 1990, 1998, 1999, 2014
- Website: laughlinriverlodge.com

The Laughlin River Lodge (formerly Sam's Town Gold River, Gold River and River Palms) is a hotel and casino on the banks of the Colorado River in Laughlin, Nevada. It is owned and operated by Richard Craig Estey (Nevada Restaurant Services). The property includes a 41,000 sq ft (3,800 m^{2}) casino and 1,000 hotel rooms in a 25-story tower. The resort has 653 slot machines and a bingo parlor.

== History ==
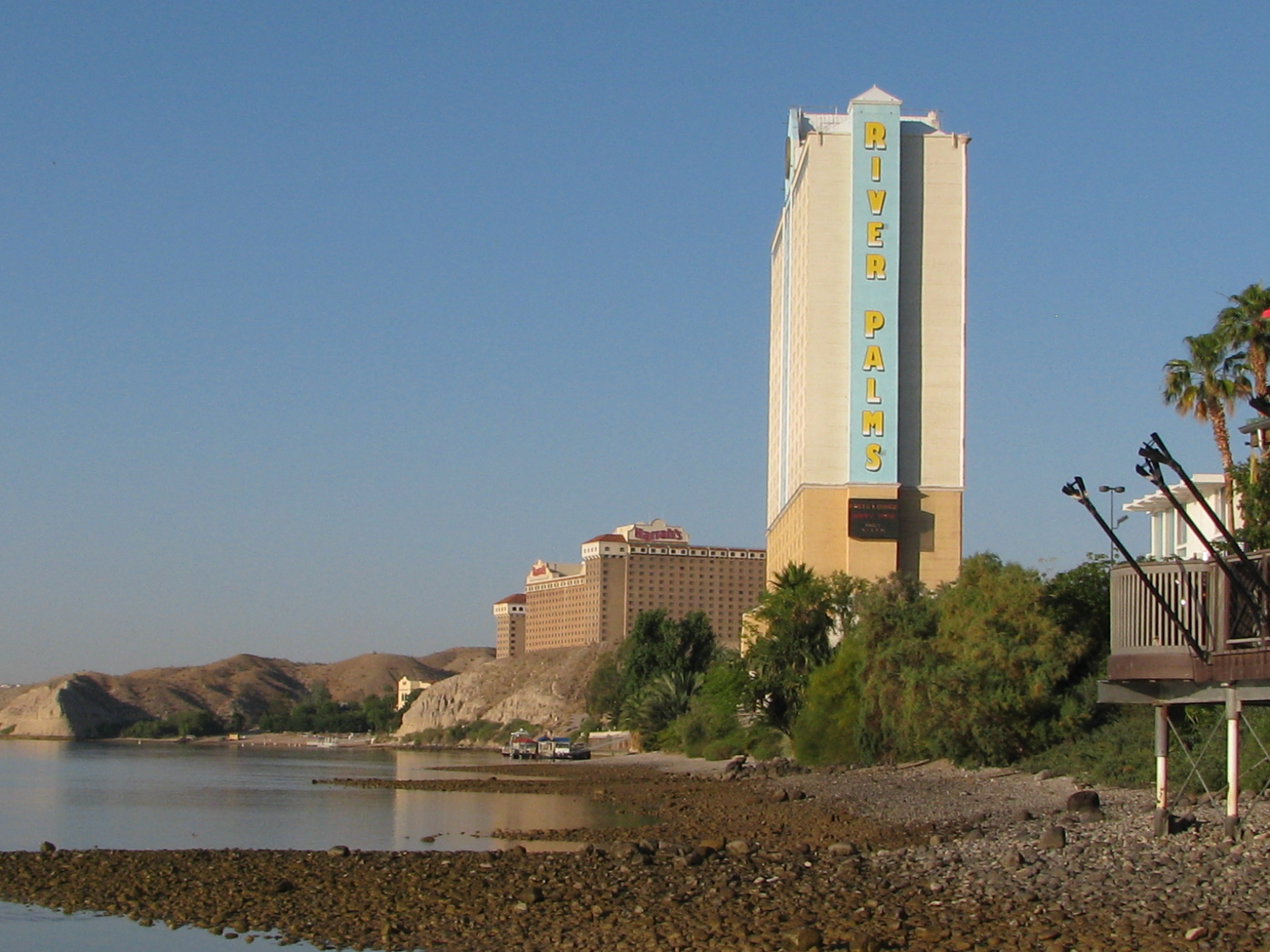
The River Palms as seen in 2008

The resort was created by Las Vegas real estate developer John Midby. It opened in 1984 as Sam's Town Gold River, later shortened to Gold River. A 25-story, 778-room hotel tower was opened in May 1990, and the gaming facilities were also expanded. Boyd Gaming operated the property under the Sam's Town Hotel and Gambling Hall brand until their contract was ended in March 1991.

Gold River filed for Chapter 11 bankruptcy protection in 1996. Businessman Allen Paulson took ownership of the reorganized company a year later, having paid an estimated $28 million for the property's $90 million in debt. It was quietly renamed as the River Palms in June 1998 and held a grand opening that October. The hotel underwent a major renovation in 1999.

Paulson died in 2000 and Columbia Sussex bought the property from his estate in 2004. After Columbia's gaming businesses went into bankruptcy, Tropicana Entertainment emerged in March 2010 with most of the company's casinos, including the River Palms.

In May 2013, Tropicana agreed to sell the River Palms for $7 million to M1 Gaming, owner of Boomtown Reno, but the sale never went through. In September 2014, Tropicana sold the River Palms for $6.75 million to Nevada Restaurant Services, and it was renamed as the Laughlin River Lodge.
