= Sam's Town Hotel and Gambling Hall, Shreveport =

American hotel and casino

Sam's Town Shreveport

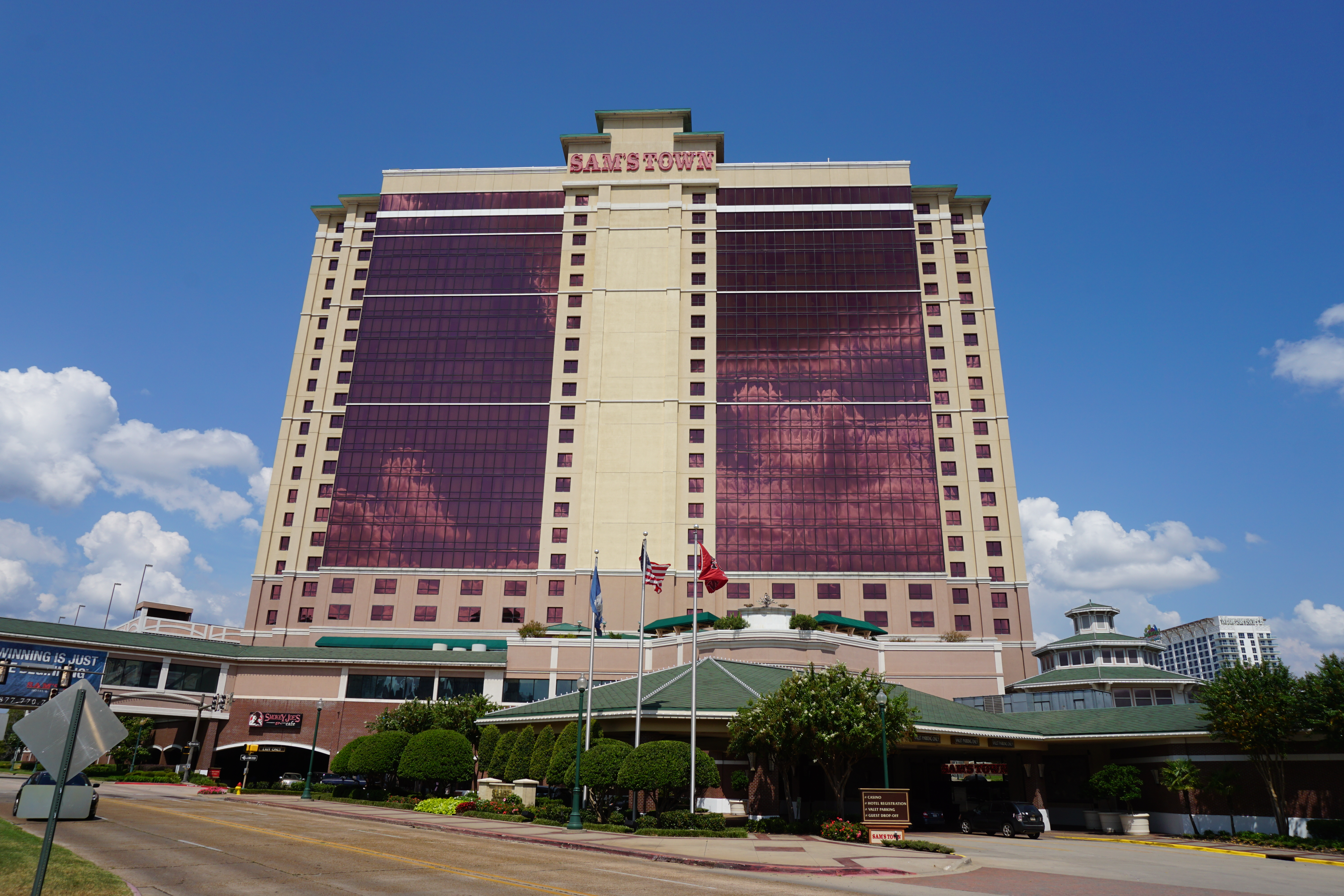
- Sam's Town Hotel and Gambling Hall in 2015
- Interactive map of Sam's Town Shreveport
- Location: Shreveport, Louisiana, U.S.; 315 Clyde Fant Parkway; 32.51844°N 93.74570°W
- Opened: 1994
- Theme: Old West
- No. of rooms: 514
- Gaming space: 30,000 sq ft (2,800 m^{2})
- Notable restaurants: International Buffet; Java's Deli; Smokey Joe's Cafe; William B's Steakhouse
- Casino type: Land-based
- Owner: Boyd Gaming
- Previous names: Harrah's Shreveport
- Renovated in: 2004
- Website: Official website

Sam's Town Shreveport is a hotel and casino in Shreveport, Louisiana. It is owned and operated by Boyd Gaming under the Sam's Town Hotel and Gambling Hall brand.

== History ==
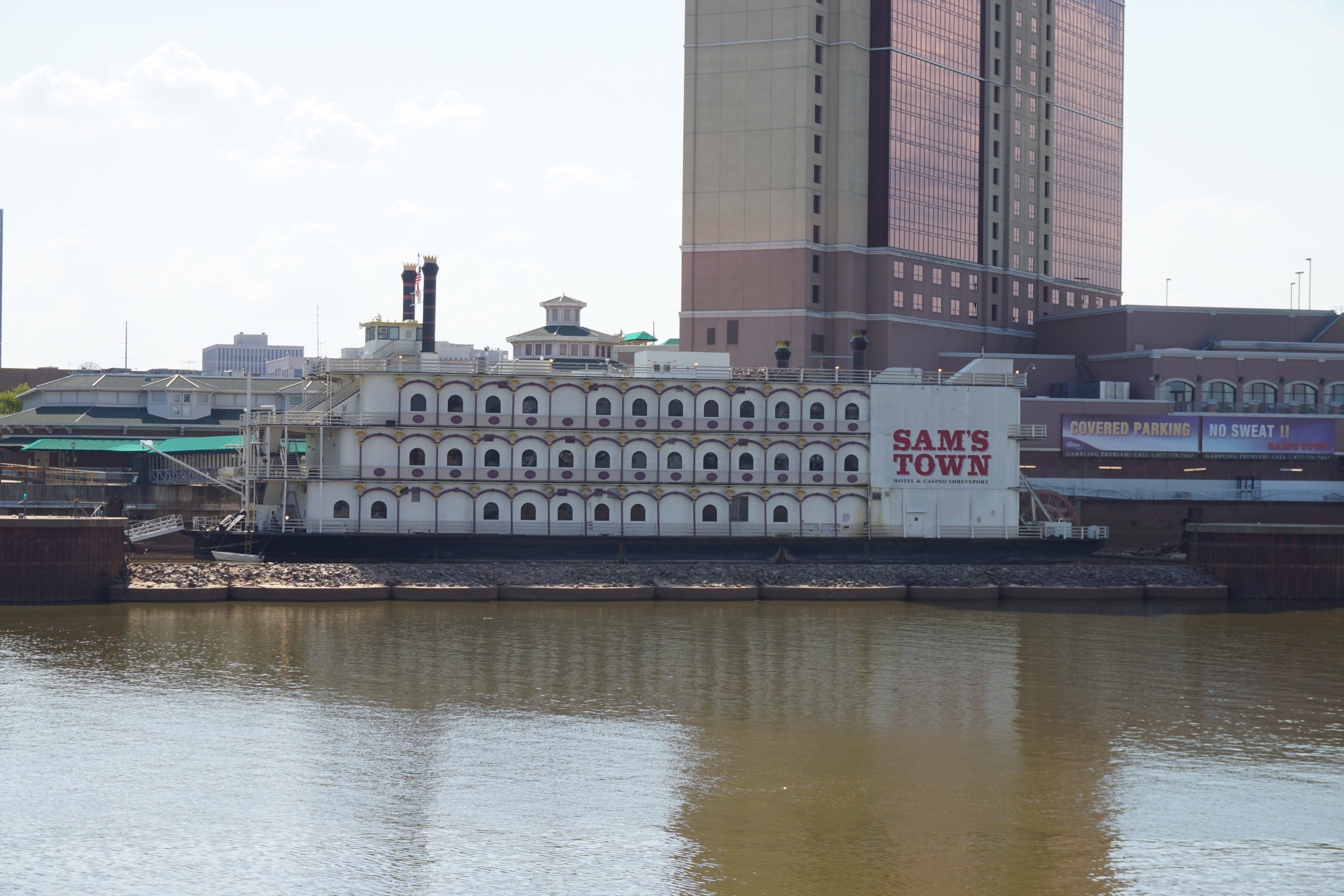
Sam's Town riverboat casino on the Red River

First known as Harrah's Shreveport, the hotel was purchased in 2004 by Boyd Gaming from Harrah's Entertainment. Harrah's sold this casino after acquiring Horseshoe Gaming Holding Corporation.

The casino opened under Boyd's Sam's Town brand on May 20, 2004, becoming the fifth casino to operate under that name.

The 30,000 square feet (2,800 m^{2}) casino features 1100 gaming machines and 29 table games for blackjack, roulette, three-card poker, and Mississippi stud poker. The 23-story hotel has 514 rooms.

== See also ==
- List of casinos in Louisiana
