= Robert Anderson =

Robert Anderson may refer to:

== Arts and entertainment ==
- Robert Anderson (editor and biographer) (1750–1830), Scottish literary scholar and editor
- Robert Anderson (poet) (1770–1833), English poet
- Robert Rowand Anderson (1834–1921), Scottish architect
- Robert Anderson (actor, born 1890) (1890–1963), Danish-born American actor
- Robert Alexander Anderson (composer) (1894–1995), American composer
- Robert Anderson (filmmaker) (1913–1997), Canadian filmmaker
- Robert Anderson (playwright) (1917–2009), American playwright and screenwriter
- Robert Anderson (singer) (1919–1995), African-American gospel singer and composer
- Robert Anderson (actor, born 1920) (1920–1996), American actor
- Robert Theodore Anderson (1934–2009), American organist, composer, and pedagogue
- Robert G. W. Anderson (born 1944), historian, former director of the British Museum
- Robert Anderson (artist) (born 1946), American portrait artist
- Robert Mailer Anderson (born 1968), American novelist
- Robert T. Anderson (poet) (1880–1960), Canadian poet
- Rob Anderson, American internet personality and comedian

== Law and politics ==
- Robert Anderson (mayor) (fl. 1810s–1820s), mayor of Williamsburg, Virginia
- Robert Stirling Hore Anderson (1821–1883), Irish-born Australian colonial politician
- Robert M. Anderson (politician) (1824–1878), lieutenant governor of California
- Robert H. Anderson (politician) (c. 1831–1879), American politician in New York
- Sir Robert Anderson, 1st Baronet (1837–1921), Irish businessman and Lord Mayor of Belfast
- Robert Anderson (Scotland Yard official) (1841–1918), lawyer, British intelligence officer and London CID chief, in charge during the Jack the Ripper murders
- Robert Alexander Anderson (politician) (1858–1916), Canadian politician in British Columbia
- Robert King Anderson (1861–1950), Canadian politician, physician and teacher
- Robert Newton Anderson (1871–1948), MP in the Northern Ireland Parliament for Londonderry
- Robert P. Anderson (1906–1978), United States judge in Connecticut
- Robert B. Anderson (1910–1989), businessman, politician, and U.S. Secretary of the Treasury
- Robert B. Anderson (South Carolina politician), member of the South Carolina House of Representatives
- Robert Banneka Anderson Sr., member of the South Carolina General Assembly
- Robert Anderson (diplomat) (1922–1996), United States ambassador to Morocco
- Robert A. Anderson (1932–2006), American politician and businessman
- Robert Anderson (New Zealand politician) (1936–1996), New Zealand politician
- Robert T. Anderson (politician) (born 1945), American politician, lieutenant governor of Iowa
- Robert Anderson (Australian Aboriginal elder) (born 1929), Australian Aboriginal elder and union official
- Rob Anderson (politician) (Robert Harmen Anderson, born 1977), Canadian politician

== Military ==
- Robert Anderson (Revolutionary War) (1741–1813), Revolutionary War general and lieutenant governor of South Carolina
- Robert Anderson (Union officer) (1805–1871), Union commander at Fort Sumter at the start of the American Civil War
- Robert H. Anderson (Confederate officer) (1835–1888), Confederate officer (brigadier general) in the American Civil War
- Robert Anderson (Medal of Honor) (1843–1900), U.S. Navy sailor and Medal of Honor recipient
- Robert Anderson (Australian general) (1865–1940), Australian World War I brigadier general

== Sports ==
- Robert Anderson (MCC cricketer) (1811–1891), English cricketer, played for Hertfordshire 1835–36 and MCC 1837–41
- Robert Anderson (New Zealand cricketer) (1948–2025), New Zealand cricketer, played nine Tests and two One Day Internationals for New Zealand
- Robert Anderson (rugby union) (c. 1900 – c. 1979), Australian rugby player
- Robert Anderson (Australian rules footballer) (born 1959), Australian rules footballer
- Robbie Anderson (American football) (born 1993), American football wide receiver
- Robbie Anderson (footballer) (1936–1996), English footballer

== Other ==
- Robert Anderson (mathematician) (fl. 1668–1696), English mathematician and silk-weaver
- Robert Anderson (inventor) (fl. 1830s), Scottish inventor
- Robert Anderson (banker) (1912–1998), banker and community leader in Hollywood, Florida
- Robert Anderson (New Zealand philanthropist), New Zealand businessman and philanthropist (knighted 1934)
- Robert Orville Anderson (1917–2007), American businessman and philanthropist
- Robert Marshall Anderson (1933–2011), Episcopal bishop of Minnesota
- Robert Leroy Anderson (1969–2003), American murderer and self-proclaimed serial killer
- Robert Anderson (murderer) (1966–2006), American murderer executed for killing a 5-year-old girl in Texas
- Robert M. Anderson (mathematician) (born 1951), professor of economics and of mathematics
- Robert Henry Anderson (1899–1969), Australian botanist
- Robert P. Anderson (zoologist), American zoologist
- Robert Wherry Anderson (1864–1937), British journalist
- Robert S. Anderson (born 1952), American geomorphologist
- Robert J. Anderson (public health administrator) (1914–1999), director of the Centers for Disease Control and Prevention
- Robert Anderson (sex offender) (1928–2008), American sex offender
- Robert Ball Anderson (1843–1930), African-American homesteader and landowner in Nebraska
- Robert Anderson Middle School, school in Anderson, South Carolina.

== See also ==
- Bob Anderson (disambiguation)
- Bobby Anderson (disambiguation)
- Robert Andersson (disambiguation)
- Robert Kiplagat Andersen (born 1972), Kenyan runner
- Joni Mitchell, born Roberta Anderson
