= R. M. Anderson =

R. M. Anderson may refer to:

- Rudolph Martin Anderson (1876–1961), Canadian zoologist and explorer
- Robert M. Anderson (disambiguation)
