= Bobby Anderson =

Bobby Anderson may refer to:

- Bobby Anderson (footballer) (1897–1974), Scottish football full back
- Bobby Anderson (baseball) (1899–1975), Negro league baseball player
- Bobby Anderson (actor) (1933–2008), American child actor and television producer
- Bobby Anderson (American football) (born 1947), American football halfback
- Bobby Anderson, guitarist for Something Corporate

== See also ==
- Bob Anderson (disambiguation)
- Robert Anderson (disambiguation)
