= Stardust Resort and Casino =

Historic casino hotel in Las Vegas, Nevada

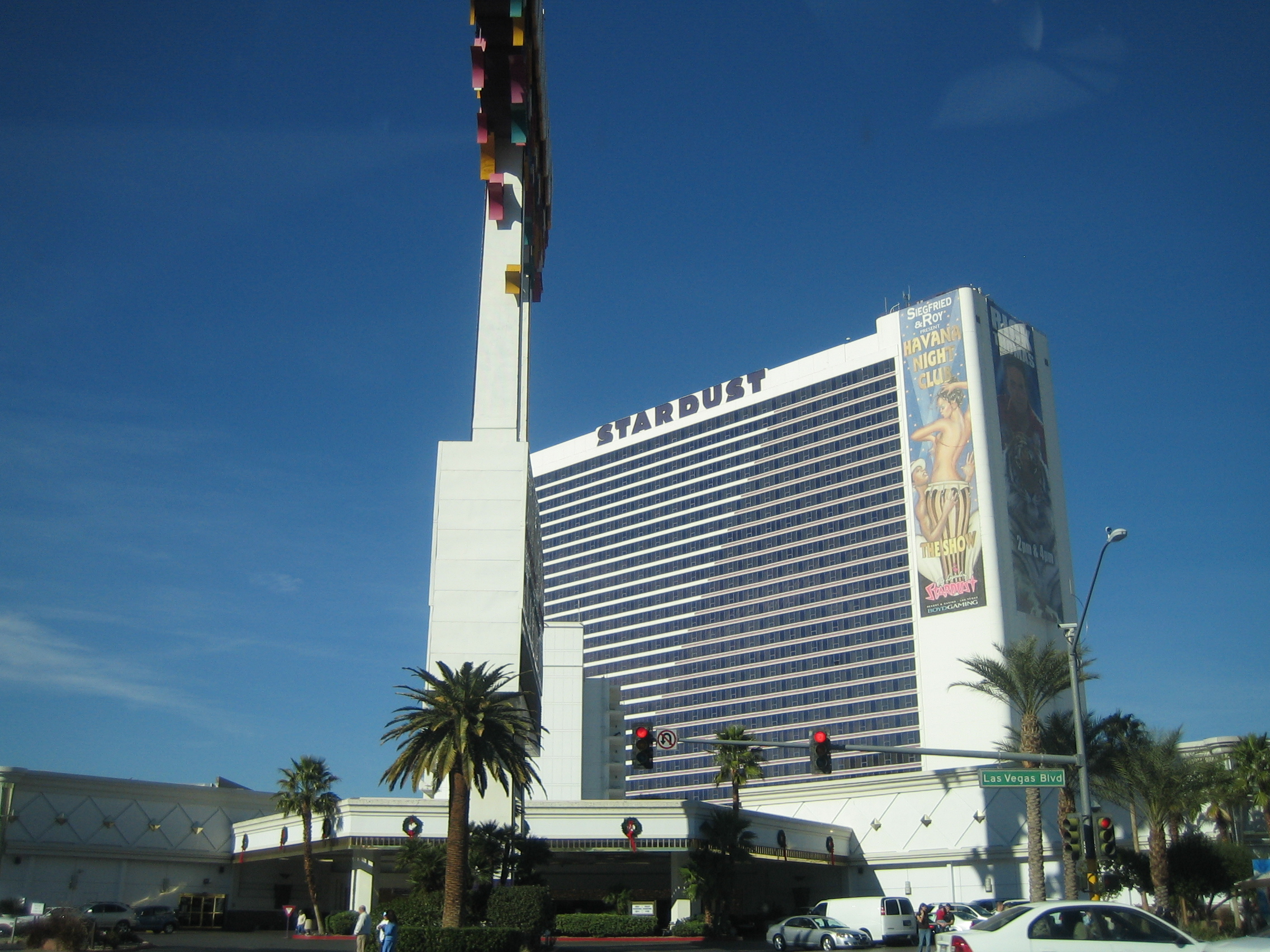

- Location within Las Vegas Strip Location within Nevada
- Interactive map of Stardust Resort and Casino
- Location: Winchester, Nevada, U.S.; 3000 South Las Vegas Boulevard; 36°8′1″N 115°9′57″W
- Opened: July 2, 1958; 68 years ago
- Closed: November 1, 2006; 20 years ago
- Theme: Outer space
- No. of rooms: 1,065 (1958); 1,552 (final years)
- Gaming space: 85,000 sq ft (7,900 m^{2})
- Permanent shows: Lido de Paris (1958–91); Enter the Night (1991–99)
- Notable restaurants: Aku Aku (1960–80); William B's Steakhouse (1987–2006)
- Casino type: Land-based
- Owner: Boyd Gaming
- Architect: Jack Miller (1958); William B. Tabler (1964); Marnell Corrao (1991)
- Renovated in: 1959, 1964, 1975, 1976, 1987, 1990, 1998–99

The Stardust Resort and Casino was a casino resort located on 60 acres (24 ha) along the Las Vegas Strip in Winchester, Nevada. The Stardust was conceived by Tony Cornero, and construction began in 1954. Cornero died in 1955, and the project was taken over by his brother. The Stardust had numerous creditors, and construction was stopped in 1956, when the project ran out of money.

Rella Factor, the wife of John Factor, bought the Stardust in January 1958, and finished construction. The Stardust opened on July 2, 1958, as the world's largest hotel. It had 1,065 rooms located across six motel structures, and included a 16,500 sq ft (1,530 m^{2}) casino. An adjacent hotel-casino, the Royal Nevada, became part of the Stardust in 1959, with its casino converted into Stardust convention space. A nine-story hotel addition was completed in 1964. The resort operated the off-site Stardust Country Club and the Stardust International Raceway during the 1960s, and in 1972, it became the first resort on the Las Vegas Strip to open an RV park for guests, a concept that proved to be popular.

After several ownership changes, Argent Corporation purchased the Stardust in 1974. Company executive Frank "Lefty" Rosenthal added a sportsbook in 1975 that would later become a popular attraction for the Stardust, and a model for future sportsbooks. In 1976, a state investigation found that a skimming operation was occurring at the Stardust and at Argent's other properties. The Stardust was sold again in 1979, to Al Sachs and Herb Tobman, both of whom had previously served as general managers for the resort. Another investigation determined in 1983 that skimming was occurring at the Stardust again. The Nevada Gaming Commission concluded that Sachs and Tobman had failed to prevent the skimming, and the men agreed to sell the Stardust.

The Boyd family purchased it in 1985, and would retain ownership for the remainder of the resort's history. The Stardust had been one of the few Las Vegas Strip resorts without a high-rise hotel tower, until the Boyds added a 32-story tower in 1990. The original Stardust motel structures were demolished around 2000, to make way for an expansion of the resort, although the nine-story tower was kept. In its final years, the Stardust included an 85,000 sq ft (7,900 m^{2}) casino and 1,552 hotel rooms. It was small compared to newer resorts on the Las Vegas Strip, and revenue fell during its last years.

Boyd Gaming announced in January 2006 that it would close and demolish the aging Stardust to build a new project, Echelon Place, on the site. The Stardust closed on November 1, 2006, and the two hotel towers were imploded on March 13, 2007. The resort had a popular roadside sign, which was given to the city's Neon Museum. Construction on the Echelon project was halted in 2008, because of financial problems caused by the Great Recession. Genting Group bought the Echelon project in 2013, and announced plans to finish it as Resorts World Las Vegas. It opened in 2021, after several delays.

The Stardust hosted numerous entertainers and shows throughout its history. At its opening, it debuted Lido de Paris, which featured topless showgirls. The show continued playing until 1991, when it was replaced by a modernized show known as Enter the Night. Wayne Newton was the resort's resident headliner from 2000 to 2005. Other entertainers who performed at the Stardust include Don Rickles, Tim Conway, Harvey Korman, Siegfried & Roy, and Steve and Eydie.

Due to the brand's lasting popularity, Boyd launched its Stardust Social Casino online game in 2020. The following year, Boyd partnered with FanDuel to launch Stardust-branded online casinos in Pennsylvania and New Jersey.

== History ==
=== Construction and financial problems ===
The Stardust was conceived by Tony Cornero, also known as Tony Stralla. He and two partners applied for a gaming license in April 1954. However, the Nevada Tax Commission said that it would never grant a license to Cornero, who had previously engaged in illegal gaming operations. Despite the commission's unwillingness, Cornero would make repeated attempts to gain approval. Work on the hotel was underway in August 1954, using tilt up construction. Approximately 60 percent of bricklayers in the Las Vegas Valley were hired to construct the Stardust, leaving few workers available to build new school facilities in the area.

The Stardust was scheduled to open in April 1955. However, a request for a gaming license was denied two months prior by the tax commission, which cited a policy that applications not be considered until a casino is one-third completed. Early on, the Stardust had more than 1,000 stockholders. Sale of the stock was banned in California in May 1955, as Cornero and his associates had been selling shares without a state permit. The Securities and Exchange Commission also alleged that Cornero had failed to file statements regarding Stardust stock sales.

Cornero eventually gave up on trying to receive a gaming license. Instead, he planned to lease the casino to a small group for $500,000 a month. The tax commission was concerned about the high rental cost, viewing it as an attempt by Cornero to get around his lack of a gaming license. Nevertheless, the group was licensed in June 1955, at which point the Stardust had 2,700 stockholders. A list of these individuals was to be provided to the Nevada Gaming Control Board for final approval, but this did not occur as scheduled, thus delaying the Stardust's planned opening on August 1, 1955. The opening was pushed back a month.

Cornero died suddenly on July 31, 1955, while gambling at the nearby Desert Inn resort. His death was considered suspicious, and an investigation was soon opened. Tony's brother, Louis Cornero, was named as the president and general manager of the Stardust. Louis Cornero was the mayor of St. Helena, California, and he only planned to remain with the Stardust until legal issues could be resolved. Construction shut down on August 1, 1955, amid a dispute with several labor unions. Work resumed the following month, and there were plans to have the resort opened by Christmas.

Frank Hofues, a Nevada hotel owner, agreed to lease the hotel rooms in November 1955. He also agreed to loan the project $2.5 million, with completion now expected by May 1, 1956. However, a class action lawsuit was filed on behalf of shareholders, challenging the loan by Hofues. Shareholders had been told by Tony Cornero that the resort could be completed for $4.5 million. The suit sought to have the Stardust placed into receivership, stating that borrowing an additional $2.5 million would not be in shareholders' best interest. Hofues died shortly thereafter, and it was later alleged that he had failed to refinance the Stardust as agreed. However, attorneys representing the Hofues estate said that his agreement had been terminated by the Stardust board of directors in June 1956.

The Stardust did not open as scheduled. In July 1956, creditors filed a petition to reorganize the resort, alleging that it owed $2 million in debt. The Stardust was 80-percent complete at the time, and it was alleged that there was no money left to finish construction, which would take another $1.2 million. A former member of the tax commission was appointed as receiver. Louis Cornero sought to regain control of the project, arguing that reorganization was not necessary to acquire construction financing. He also said that most of the creditors who sought reorganization were not eligible to do so. Stockholders alleged that Louis Cornero was incompetent in his position as president. The creditors' petition was ultimately approved.

In January 1957, several offers were put in by groups wanting to purchase and complete the Stardust. The Sheraton hotel chain was among prospective buyers for the resort, but eventually passed. United Hotels Corporation, which consisted of Desert Inn shareholders, also expressed an interest in buying the Stardust. By mid-1957, the Stardust had five prospective buyers, including Rella Factor, who was the wife of John Factor. Each buyer submitted a plan to pay off creditors, and Factor's was viewed most favorably. In November 1957, Factor and her group received court approval to take over the Stardust, with an opening expected around April 1, 1958. Factor paid $4.3 million for the resort, and took over ownership in January 1958. Construction of the Stardust resumed that month, after 18 months of inactivity.

=== Opening and early years ===
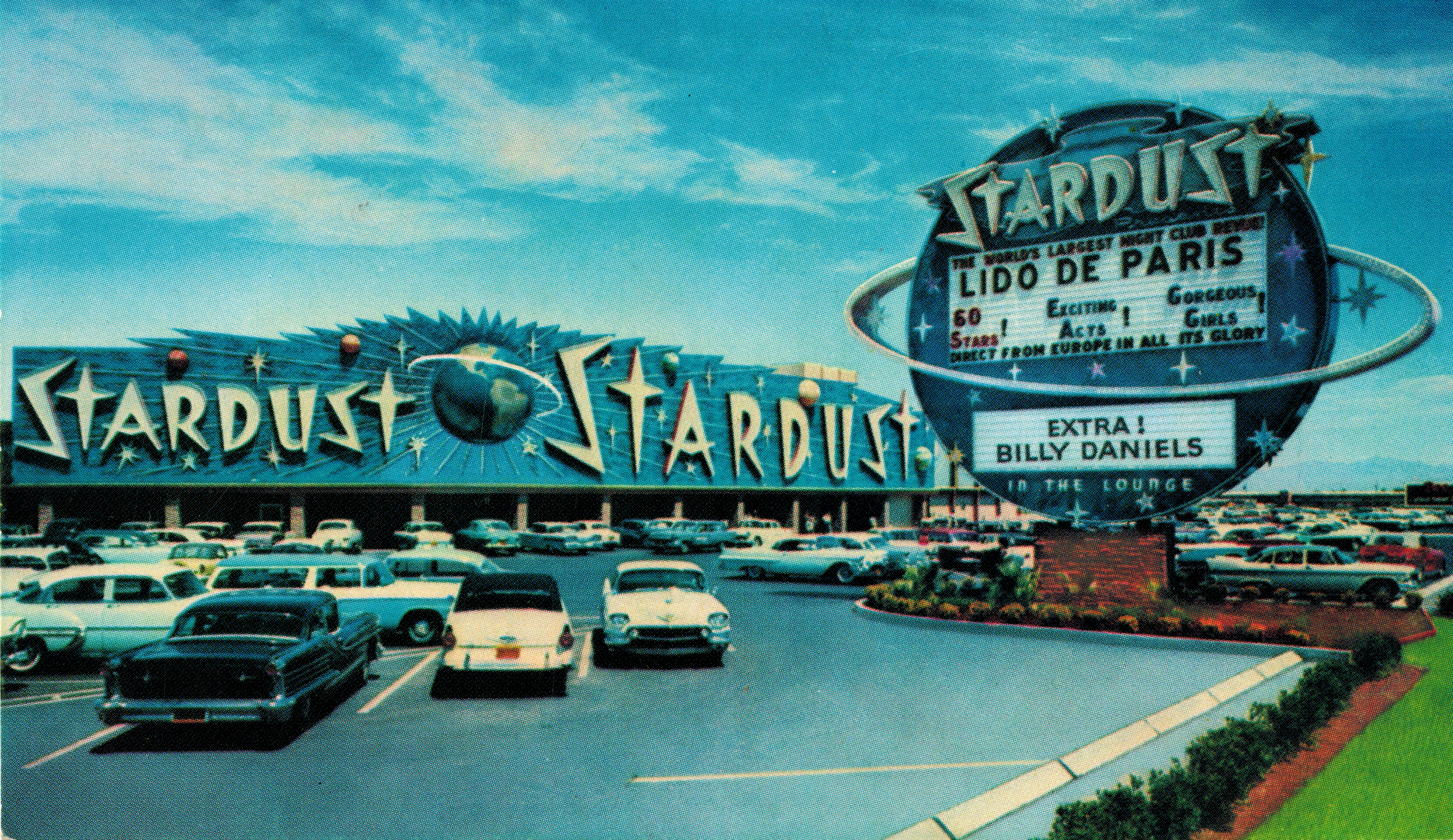
The Stardust, c. early 1960s

The Stardust opened at 12:01 p.m. on July 2, 1958. Attendees of the opening included Nevada governor Charles H. Russell, U.S. senator George Malone, and various celebrities such as Bob Hope, Milton Berle, and Ethel Merman. The Stardust continued to face financial problems after its opening. John and Rella Factor had agreed to pay off the Stardust's debt through monthly payments. However, a month after the opening, they requested a reduction in the amount of money to be paid out each month. Up to that point, the Stardust had more than $1 million in liens filed against it, and a local glass company filed a foreclosure suit against the resort later in the month. Also among the creditors were two attorneys, seeking payment after representing the first group of proposed casino managers in 1955.

The Stardust's casino portion was managed by United Hotels Corporation, which also operated the Desert Inn. United Hotels took over complete management of the entire resort on September 1, 1958. United Hotels was renamed as United Resort Hotels in 1959, and the company continued to manage the Stardust hotel. The casino portion was now managed by Karat Inc., also consisting mostly of Desert Inn officials. The Desert Inn group took over ownership from the Factors in August 1962, after the Stardust exited reorganization. Investors from years earlier were soon reimbursed. Subsequently, the Teamsters Union Pension Fund made several loans to the Stardust. A nine-story hotel addition was completed in 1964. A year later, the Stardust was purchased by Lodestar, Inc., which consisted of major Desert Inn stockholders such as Moe Dalitz, who had affiliations with organized crime.

By the end of 1967, there were reports that Howard Hughes made a deal to purchase the Stardust for $40 million, although the agreement later fell apart. Negotiations were underway again in March 1968, despite monopoly concerns; Hughes already owned several other Las Vegas casinos. Hughes received preliminary approval from the Nevada Gaming Control Board, which stated that his purchase would not give him a monopoly on Las Vegas gaming. However, a federal antitrust investigation was launched days before the purchase would have been finalized. Hughes eventually dropped his purchase plans in August 1968. Nevada governor Paul Laxalt criticized the investigation and denied that Hughes' purchase would have constituted a monopoly.

In 1969, Parvin-Dohrmann Corporation purchased the Stardust from Lodestar for nearly $40 million. Parvin-Dohrmann, based in Los Angeles, also operated the Fremont and Aladdin resorts in Las Vegas. Parvin-Dohrmann was renamed as Recrion Corporation in 1970, and Al Sachs was chosen as the new general manager for the Stardust, after serving as the casino manager there. During 1970, NASA loaned a Moon rock to the Stardust for display in the resort. A fire broke out at the Stardust two weeks later. The Moon rock was secured, and 500 people were evacuated. A fireman was killed, and several guests had to be treated for smoke inhalation. Arson was ruled out as the cause of the fire, which began in a first-floor supply room full of flammable cleaning fluids.

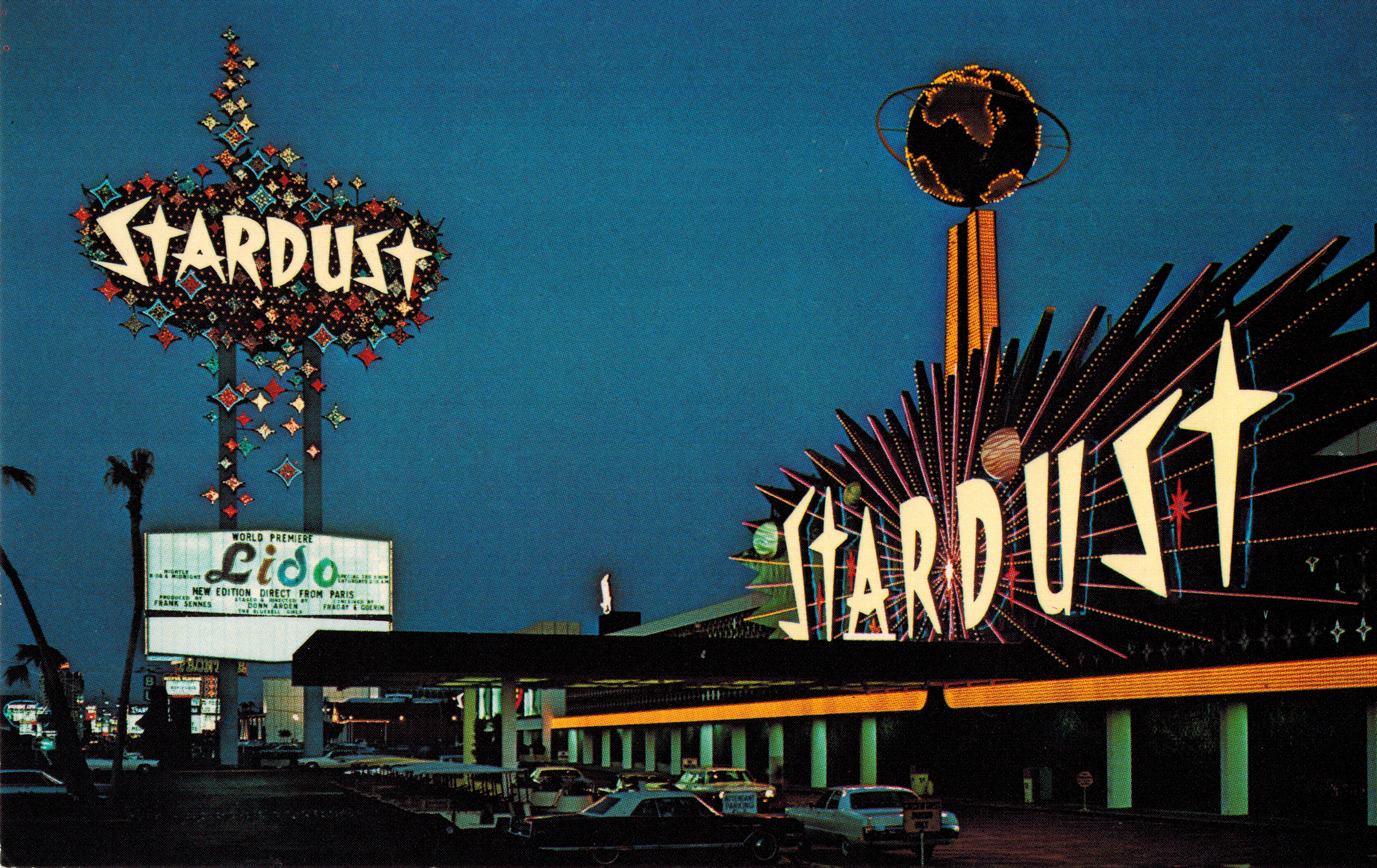
The Stardust, sometime between 1968 and 1977

In 1972, hotel company Hyatt began negotiations to purchase Recrion and its properties. However, Recrion soon canceled plans to sell the Stardust. Allen Glick, a San Diego developer, purchased the Stardust in 1974, using money borrowed from the Teamsters Union Pension Fund. Glick made the purchase through his company, Argent Corporation.

In 1975, concerns were raised that Argent executive Rosenthal was involved in the company's casino operations, despite not being licensed. In May 1976, the Nevada Gaming Control Board launched an investigation into a slot cheating operation at the Stardust, possibly dating back to 1968. Dozens of former and current employees were questioned as the board sought to determine their involvement in the operation. The investigation soon widened to look at Argent's other casino properties, leading to the discovery of a skimming operation at the resorts. It was among the city's biggest skimming scandals. Jay Vandermark, the Stardust's slot machine boss, oversaw the skimming. He disappeared once the operation was uncovered, and he was later presumed dead. Rosenthal was never charged in connection with the skimming.

By 1978, a special grand jury was formed to investigate organized crime connections with the Stardust. Glick grew tired of state and federal investigations regarding his casinos, and he announced in June 1978 that he would lease out and eventually sell the Stardust.

=== Sachs and Tobman ===
Sachs, along with Herb Tobman, took over operations in 1979, through a management contract with Glick. Tobman, like Sachs, had previously operated the Stardust years earlier. While Sachs and Tobman were handling operations again, Glick was negotiating to sell the resort to brothers Fred and Ed Doumani, although this did not proceed. An attorney for the Doumanis said that Argent had failed to provide necessary information to complete the sale. Glick eventually sold the Stardust to Sachs at the end of 1979.

Sachs was licensed by the state despite alleged affiliations with the Chicago mob. It was later discovered that Richard Bunker, the former chairman of the Nevada Gaming Control Board, had withheld an investigative report from the board during Sachs' licensing. The report documented the 1970s skimming operation and concluded that Sachs had hired Rosenthal and Vandermark. However. Bunker said he withheld the report because the evidence of Sachs' involvement was actually inconclusive. Tobman would later become a co-owner of the Stardust, although he said that he was never required to be licensed.

In 1982, federal authorities accused Sachs and Tobman of providing skimmed money to the Chicago mob. On December 4, 1983, after a two-year investigation, the gaming commission ordered the suspension of the Stardust's gaming license, using new emergency powers for the first time to remove casino management. An 18-count complaint was filed against Sachs and Tobman, stating that they failed to take appropriate action to stop this latest skimming operation, which totaled more than $1.5 million. The men themselves were not accused of skimming. Gaming officials sought a record $3.5 million fine for 222 alleged gaming violations. This latest investigation was part of an effort to remove Mafia figures from Nevada gaming operations. The Stardust had become infamous for its mob affiliations. A federal agent described it as "the flagship of organized crime on the Strip".

Constellation Inc, led by a trio that included Bill Boyd, was chosen by the gaming control board to temporarily manage the casino. Sachs fought to regain control of the Stardust, but was rejected. In January 1984, he and Tobman agreed to sell the Stardust and pay the fines. A 130-day period was granted to keep the gaming license intact while the men tried to sell the resort. Meanwhile, a federal grand jury indicted five former Stardust employees for their role in the latest skimming operation. Trans-Sterling Inc, the resort's operating company owned by Sachs and Tobman, was also indicted for its role. Charges against one of the five employees were later dismissed, due to a lack of conclusive evidence.

Several prospective buyers emerged for the Stardust, including William Morris, who owned the nearby Landmark hotel-casino. Wayne Newton was another candidate, and Sachs and Tobman ultimately chose him, although he encountered problems in acquiring the necessary funds. The gaming control board became concerned that Newton was chosen merely to delay the sale of the Stardust. The 130-day deadline passed without a sale. Sachs and Tobman filed a suit against the state, seeking a temporary restraining order and preliminary injunction to maintain the gaming license. However, a judge ruled against them.

In September 1984, Sachs and Tobman alleged that Constellation had diverted revenue from the Stardust to benefit its other casinos. Meanwhile, four groups were in discussions to purchase the Stardust. Morris began negotiations with Imperial Palace owner Ralph Engelstad to become equal partners in a purchase of the Stardust. Stuart and Clifford S. Perlman were also in discussions to buy the resort.

California Hotel and Casinos, led by the Boyd family, agreed in November 1984 to purchase the Stardust. The sale was finalized on March 1, 1985. Meanwhile, Sachs and Tobman would make several attempts to reclaim the money that they paid in fines, stating that they were forced to sign a settlement with the state to sell the Stardust. Their efforts were unsuccessful, although the state did agree to pay Sachs $450,000, resolving a dispute over casino entertainment taxes.

=== Later years ===
The Boyd purchase helped to end the era of mob control in Las Vegas casinos. Prior to that point, Bill Boyd had never considered owning a Las Vegas Strip property. The Boyd family were surprised to see how profitable the Stardust actually was, now that skimming was no longer being practiced there. The Boyds introduced a personal style of customer service. According to Bill Boyd, "When we took over the dealers weren't even allowed to talk to customers. We're more of a family-type company."

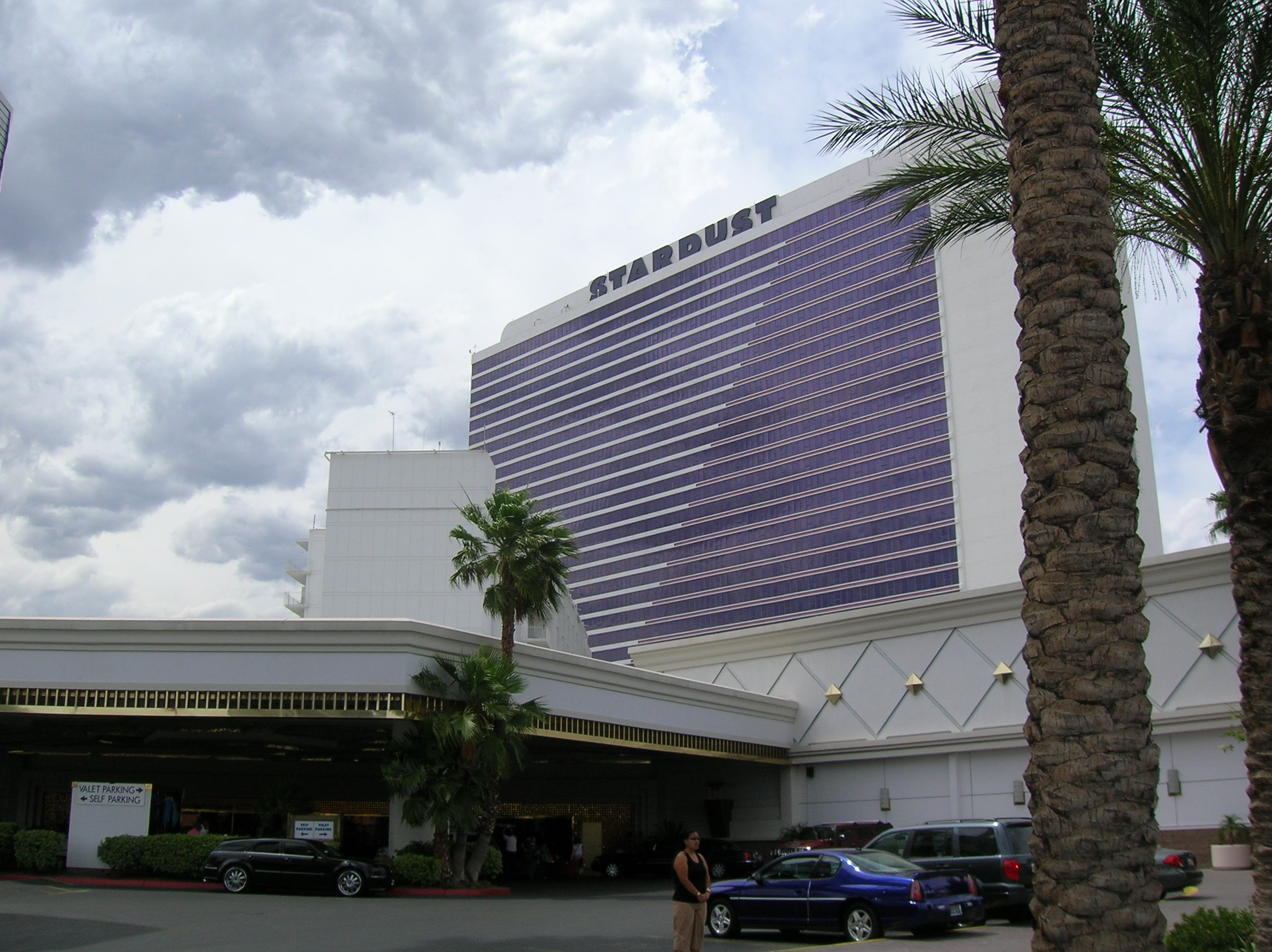
The Stardust's 32-story tower

Steve Wynn's new Mirage resort was opened in 1989. It marked the start of a building boom on the Las Vegas Strip, creating new competition for the Stardust. A 32-story hotel tower was added to the Stardust in 1990, and the resort saw its highest revenue in the mid-1990s, after the completion of the tower.

A robbery occurred at the Stardust in 1992, when two men used smoke bombs to steal $1.1 million from a guard, who was bringing the money to an armored truck. A former Stardust security guard was later arrested in connection with the robbery. Later in 1992, a Stardust sportsbook cashier covertly managed to steal $225,000 in cash and casino chips; he disappeared and was never apprehended by authorities.

A lengthy dispute, between the Stardust and a carpenters trade union, was settled in 1998. The Stardust carpenters had gone 11 years without a raise, and the National Labor Relations Board eventually filed a complaint against Boyd Gaming, which ultimately agreed to provide raises for the employees.

A murder occurred in the sportsbook in 2000, when one man shot another. The suspect, who was ultimately convicted of the murder, claimed that the victim was a mob enforcer sent to kill him.

In the late 1990s, Boyd Gaming delayed plans to redevelop the Stardust property, choosing instead to focus on its Borgata hotel-casino in Atlantic City, New Jersey. The Stardust experienced weak revenue during 2001, and approximately 200 employees were laid off. The resort suffered further due to the economic impact of the September 11 attacks. In 2002, new projects were underway in the area around the Stardust, including a new resort by Wynn. As a result, Boyd Gaming announced that it was considering the construction of a new resort to replace the Stardust, although such plans were still years away from happening.

The Stardust celebrated its 45th anniversary in July 2003. Past entertainers at the resort were invited as VIPs for a celebration held there, and a time capsule was created for Stardust memorabilia. A new cocktail was also created and served at the Stardust to commemorate the anniversary. Bill Boyd said that the Stardust provided a retro experience for those seeking it, saying, "It's Old Las Vegas, and we have a lot of customers who enjoy the classic Las Vegas experience." However, the resort was no longer a top-earner for Boyd Gaming, and increased marketing of the resort failed to produce additional revenue. The Stardust site, consisting of 60 acres (24 ha), was considered a prime piece of land for redevelopment.

Future redevelopment possibilities would include the demolition of the Stardust for a new resort, or the construction of an adjacent resort on property located behind the Stardust. In 2004, Boyd Gaming purchased 13 acres of property located next to the Stardust, as part of its eventual redevelopment plans for the site. The property was occupied by a 639-room Budget Suites hotel. Revenue at the Stardust was helped by the opening of the nearby Wynn Las Vegas in 2005, but fell throughout 2006. In its final years, the Stardust struggled to attract younger customers and convention-goers.

=== Closure and demolition ===
On January 3, 2006, Boyd Gaming announced plans to close the Stardust within a year and replace it with a mixed-use project called Echelon Place, scheduled to open in 2010. Boyd Gaming planned to relocate some of the Stardust employees to other Boyd properties in Las Vegas. Some employees expressed sadness about the impending closure. Boyd announced on September 5, 2006, that the Stardust would close in two months. The closure was earlier than Boyd had expected, as some employees had left the resort early for new jobs, making it difficult to continue operations at the Stardust.

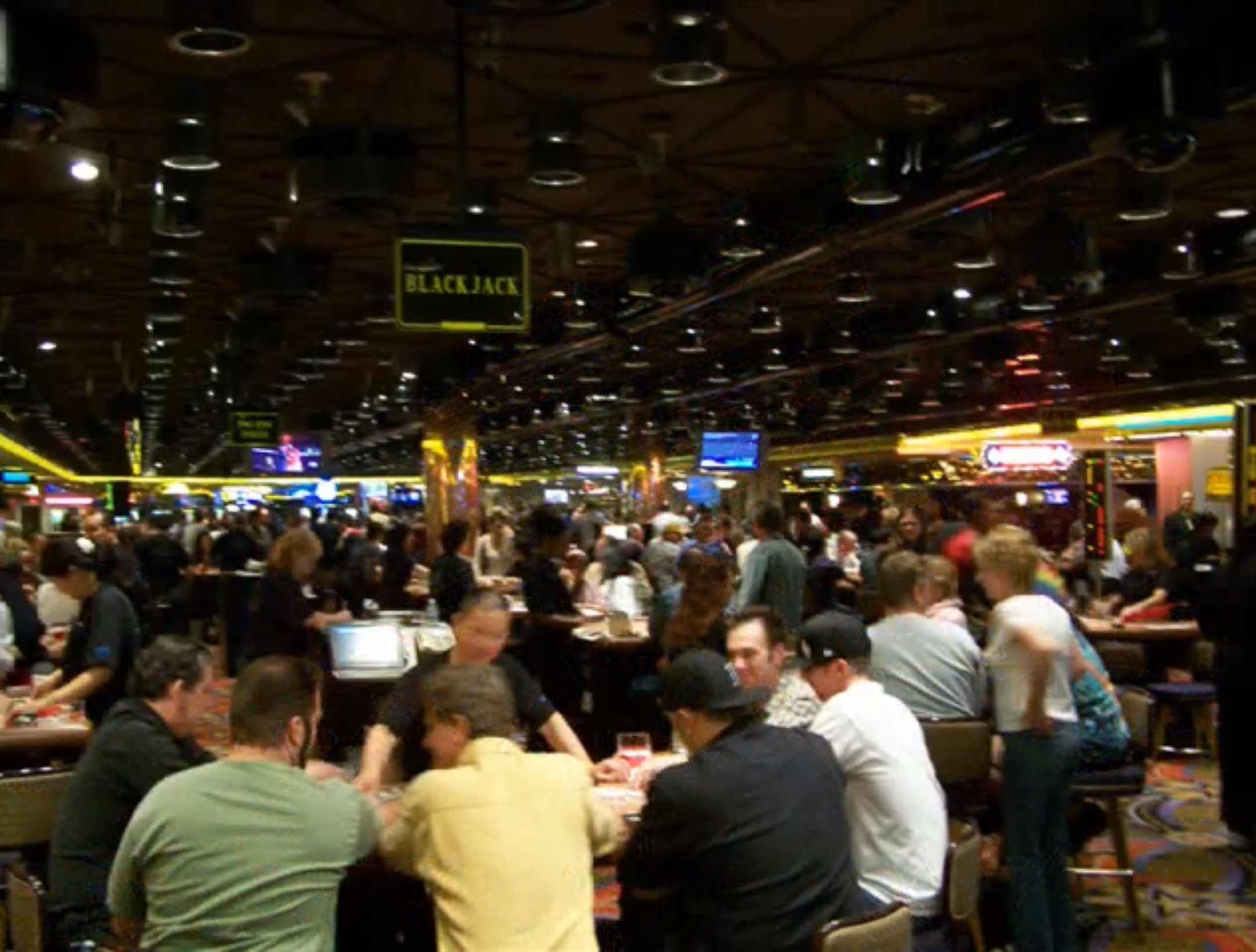
Inside the casino on Stardust’s final night

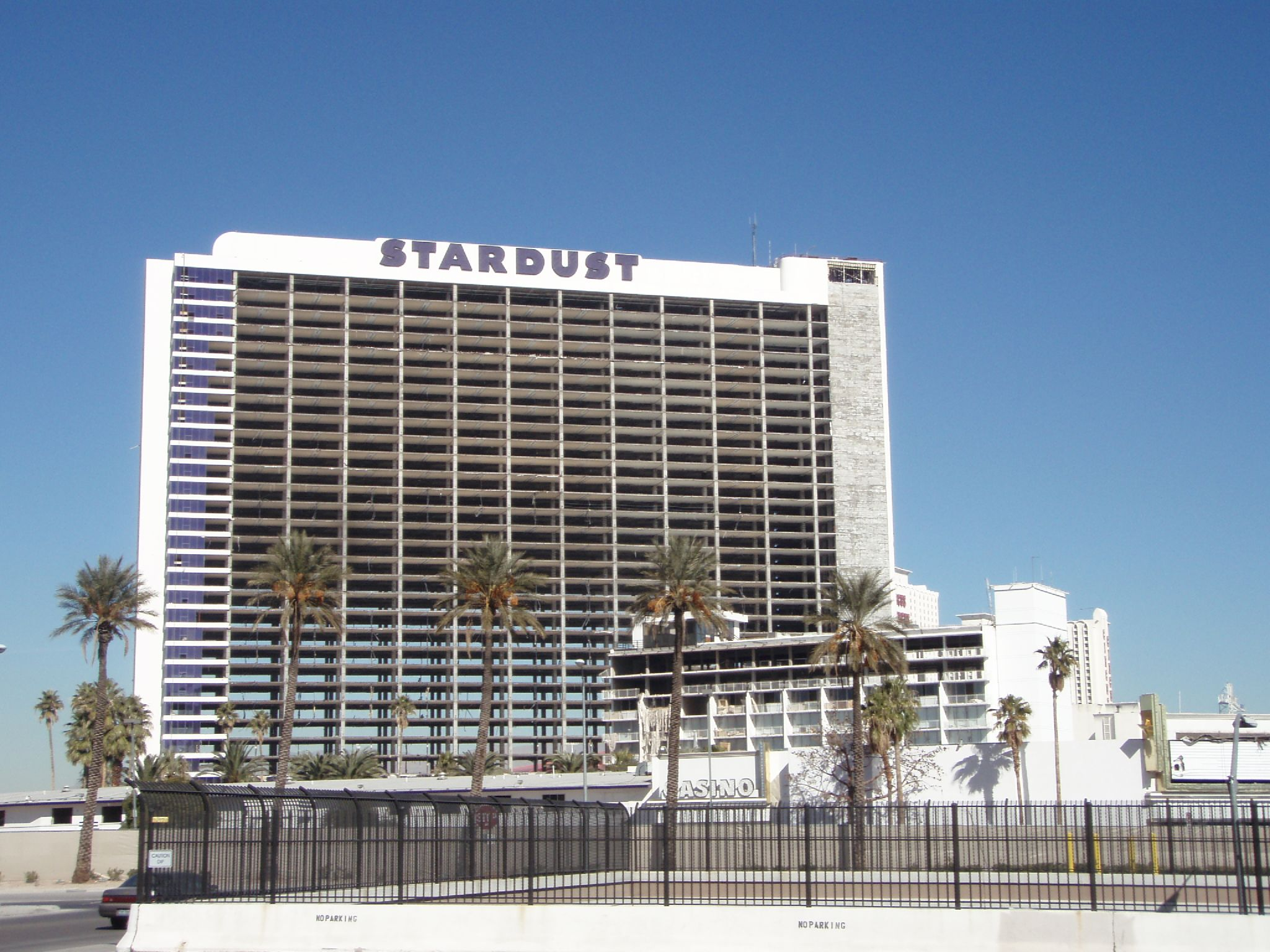
Stardust towers during interior demolition, February 2007

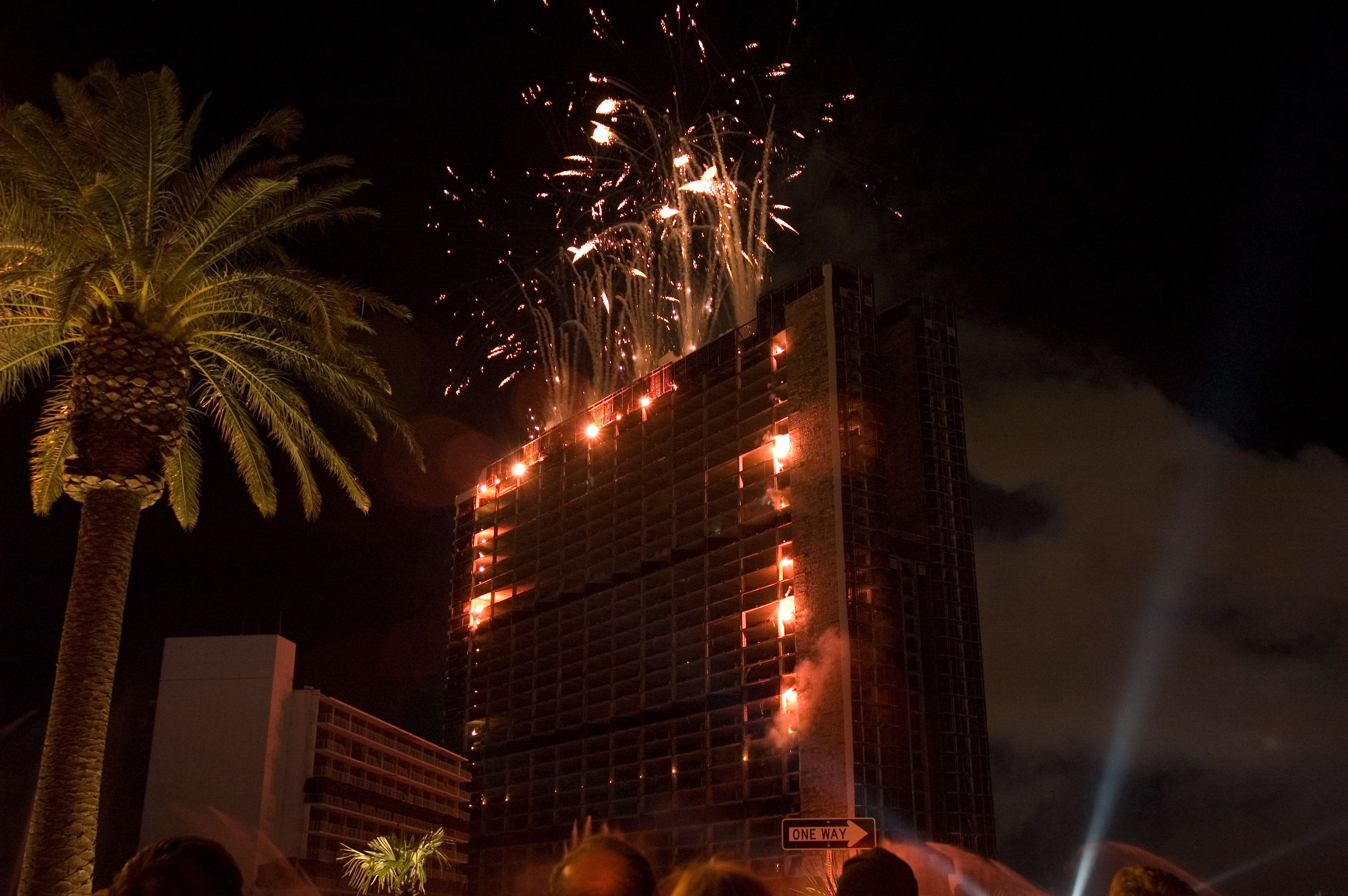
Fireworks show shortly before implosion

External videos
- Video of the Stardust implosion

The Stardust closed on November 1, 2006. Gaming operations began to shut down that morning, followed by the full closure at 12:00 p.m. It was the largest resort to close on the Las Vegas Strip since the Sands Hotel and Casino in 1996. Long-time customers found the Stardust more personable compared to newer resorts, and they turned out in thousands for the resort's final days. Bill Boyd said about employees, "They're leaving as if they're losing their closest friends. That's why we had such a great place: The employees were loyal and made our customers feel at home. The way Boyd Gaming operates, it's much more of a family atmosphere than many other places."

The hotel was sold out for the final night before the closure. The Stardust had nearly 1,600 employees at the time, down about 200 from usual. Prior to the closure, a year had been spent cataloging more than 70,000 Stardust items to be auctioned off, including furniture, carpets, artwork, and palm trees. The five-day auction took place in the Stardust convention space a few weeks after the resort closed, and it attracted thousands of people.

Boyd Gaming had considered preserving the 32-story tower and incorporating it into the Echelon project, but the company decided that a completely vacant parcel of land would be better. The 32-story and 9-story hotel towers would be demolished through implosion; they were stripped of their interior to minimize debris, leaving behind only the concrete and steel that made up the buildings. This process took several months to complete. Demolition crews worked on a total of 27 Stardust structures in the months after the closure. Pipes, wires, and glass were removed from the property, along with 100,000 sq ft (9,300 m^{2}) of asbestos.

Smaller buildings were demolished in early 2007, and the two towers were imploded at 2:34 a.m. on March 13, 2007, after a four-minute fireworks show. Thousands of spectators watched the implosion from nearby areas. The towers contained more than 500,000 tons of concrete and steel, and it took more than 20 minutes for the resulting dust to disappear. The debris clean-up was expected to take two months. The implosion was overseen by Controlled Demolition, Inc., which had handled every prior resort implosion on the Las Vegas Strip. The 32-story tower is the tallest building to ever be imploded on the Strip.

=== Redevelopment and legacy ===
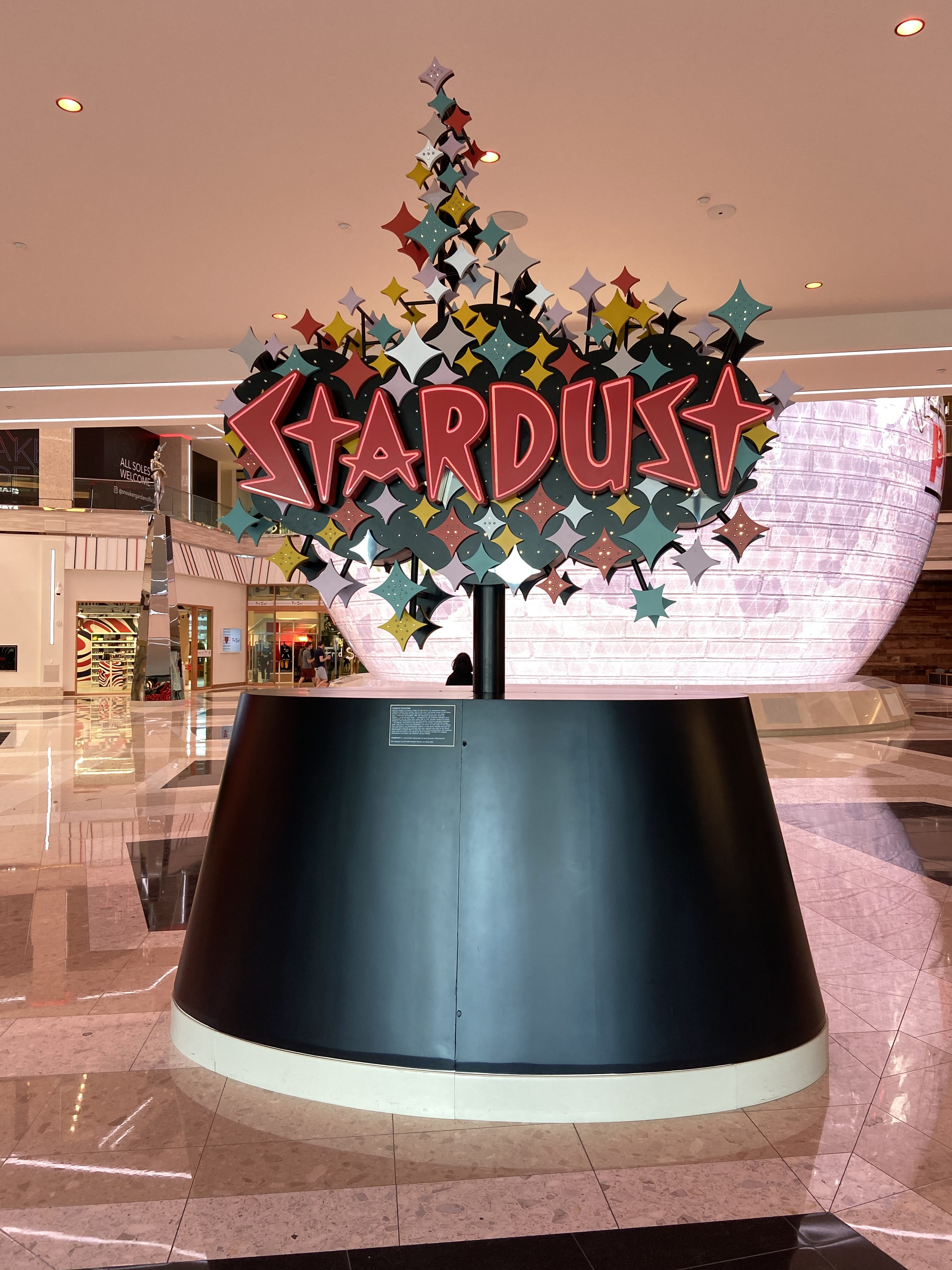
Stardust sculpture inside Resorts World Las Vegas in 2022

Boyd postponed the Echelon project in 2008, amid poor economic conditions caused by the Great Recession. In March 2013, Boyd sold the unfinished Echelon project to Genting Group, which planned to complete the project as a new property called Resorts World Las Vegas. It was initially expected to open in 2016, but was delayed several times because of design changes. It opened in June 2021, and includes an indoor sculpture depicting the Stardust's roadside sign.

The Stardust name would continue to be used for other Boyd properties, including the Stardust Suite at the Orleans resort in Las Vegas, and the Stardust Event Center at the Blue Chip resort in Indiana. As of 2020, the Stardust name retains its wide name recognition, spanning across multiple generations and throughout the United States. Boyd Gaming, surprised by the brand's lasting popularity, launched an online casino game in 2020 called Stardust Social Casino. In March 2021, Boyd partnered with FanDuel to create online casinos in Pennsylvania and New Jersey, under the Stardust name. They launched in April 2021, for Android and iOS computers.

== Architecture and design ==
Construction on the Stardust began in the summer of 1954. There is no evidence an architect was hired to design the structure. Instead, it is likely that the general contractor, Donald R. Patterson, did the design. The five hotel wings were designed by engineer Tung-Yen Lin.

The Stardust was the largest hotel in the world when it opened, with 1,065 rooms. The rooms were located across six motel-like buildings, each named after a planet: Jupiter, Mars, Mercury, Neptune, Saturn, and Venus. Parking was provided outside each building. The casino measured 16,500 square feet (1,530 m^{2}), and the resort interior featured rich red and deep brown coloring. The hotel included the Big Dipper swimming pool, measuring 105 feet (32 m) long and containing 175,000 US gallons (660,000 L; 146,000 imp gal). It also featured the Stardust Drive-In movie theater, located behind the resort. It was originally called the Motor-Vu. It predated the Stardust's opening, and was later replaced by the Budget Suites motel. The Stardust also had its own barbershop, which operated for more than 40 years, until the resort's closure.

The Stardust took over the adjacent Royal Nevada hotel-casino in 1958, and joined it with the Stardust a year later. The casino, showroom, and restaurant at the Royal Nevada were converted into convention space and operated as the Stardust Auditorium. The Stardust heavily marketed its convention facilities. The Royal Nevada's hotel also became part of the Stardust, providing additional rooms. In November 1959, construction began on an additional hotel building. The $1 million structure would be three stories high and contain 160 rooms, with completion expected within five months. The nine-story hotel tower was added in 1964.

The Stardust Country Club, located a few miles east of the resort, was added in 1961. The resort also owned and operated the off-site Stardust International Raceway, which held races from 1965 to 1968. The racetrack was created to attract high rollers to the resort. The track was located west of the resort, in an area that would later become Spring Valley, Nevada. When Parvin-Dohrmann purchased the Stardust in 1969, the company had little interest in the Stardust racetrack and soon sold it. The company also ended its lease of the golf course.

In 1967, the Stardust opened Horseman's Park, which was located behind the resort and hosted horse events. It was the only horse show arena on the Las Vegas Strip. A 142-space RV park, called Camperland, was opened behind the hotel in 1972, on less than 10 acres. Stardust manager Al Sachs conceived the idea after realizing the high number of RV tourists in Las Vegas. The Stardust was the first resort on the Las Vegas Strip to offer an RV park, although other resort owners were skeptical that such a concept could work. Camperland included its own swimming pool, playground, and recreational hall. It was an immediate success, and plans were quickly announced to expand the site to 400 spaces. The Camperland expansion was completed in 1973, and plans were announced for a 17-story hotel tower, although it ultimately would not be until 1990 that the resort added a high-rise tower.

Under Argent's ownership, the casino was enlarged and a sportsbook was added during 1975. Argent also sought approval to build a 19-story hotel tower. The first phase of a $70 million expansion was finished in July 1976. The casino, at 72,000 sq ft (6,700 m^{2}), was the largest in the world according to Glick. Among the new features was an expanded sportsbook. Glick also still planned to add additional hotel rooms, which would be built behind the Stardust. Portions of the existing resort would have to be demolished to accommodate the proposed hotel expansion.

In 1981, the resort launched Stardust Line, a radio sports show that broadcast across the United States. It continued airing for the next 25 years. The Stardust sportsbook became popular across the United States in the late 1980s, after being featured in various media such as television news and magazines. The sportsbook offered Las Vegas' first line in betting, and was popular among professional bettors. The sportsbook offered unique betting rules during its peak, before adopting a more conventional approach in 1991. During its final decade, the Stardust offered a popular head-to-head football handicapping contest, held each Friday night. The sportsbook also allowed betting on any kind of sport.

After taking ownership, the Boyds spent $6 million on room renovations, and plans were announced in 1986 for another $26 million in renovations. A $50 million renovation project was finished in 1987, adding a 30,000 sq ft (2,800 m^{2}) shopping mall and other features, including a new resort entrance. The renovation also added the 10,000 sq ft (930 m^{2}) Olde-Tyme Gambling Museum, featuring antique slot machines.

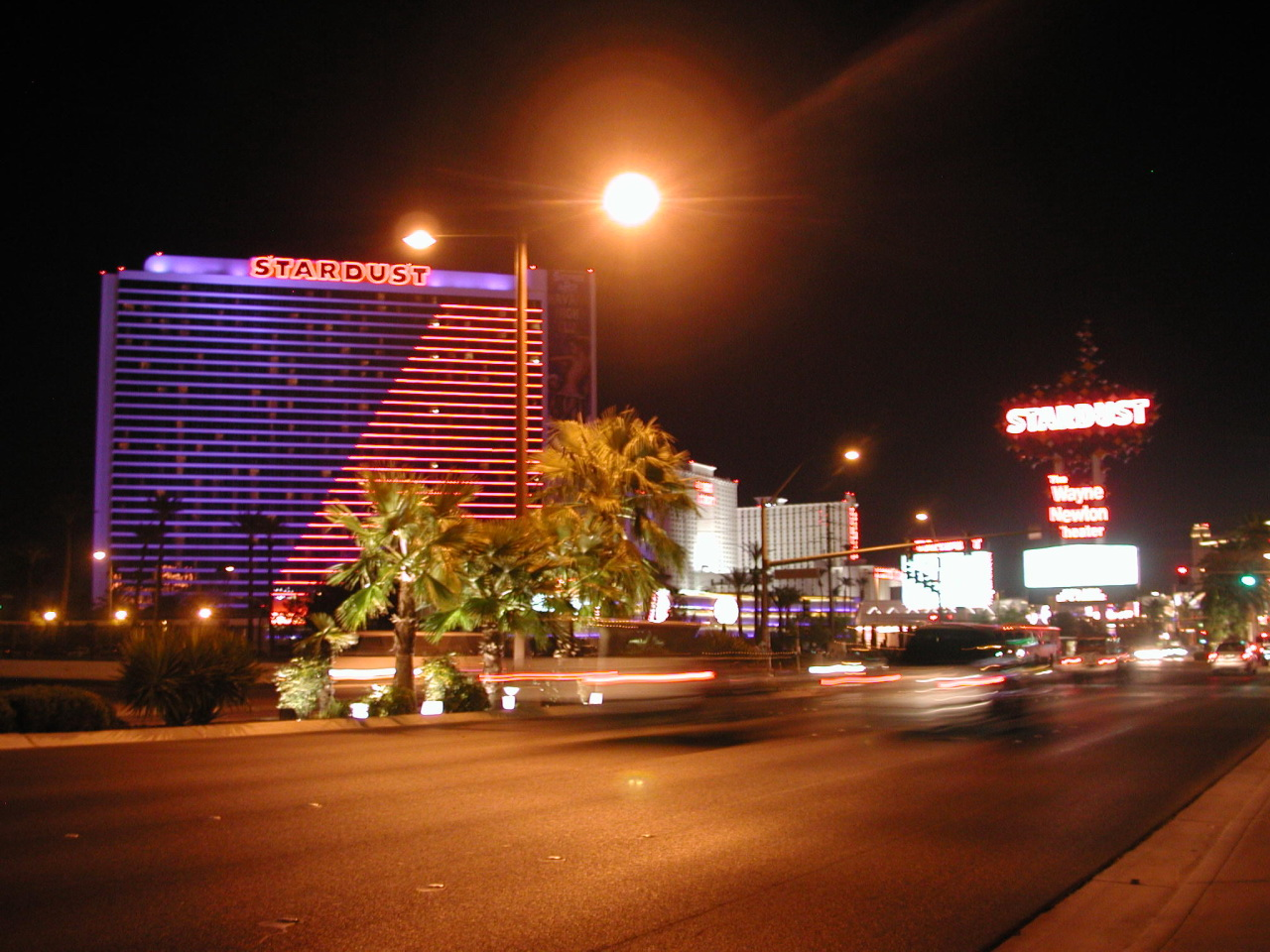
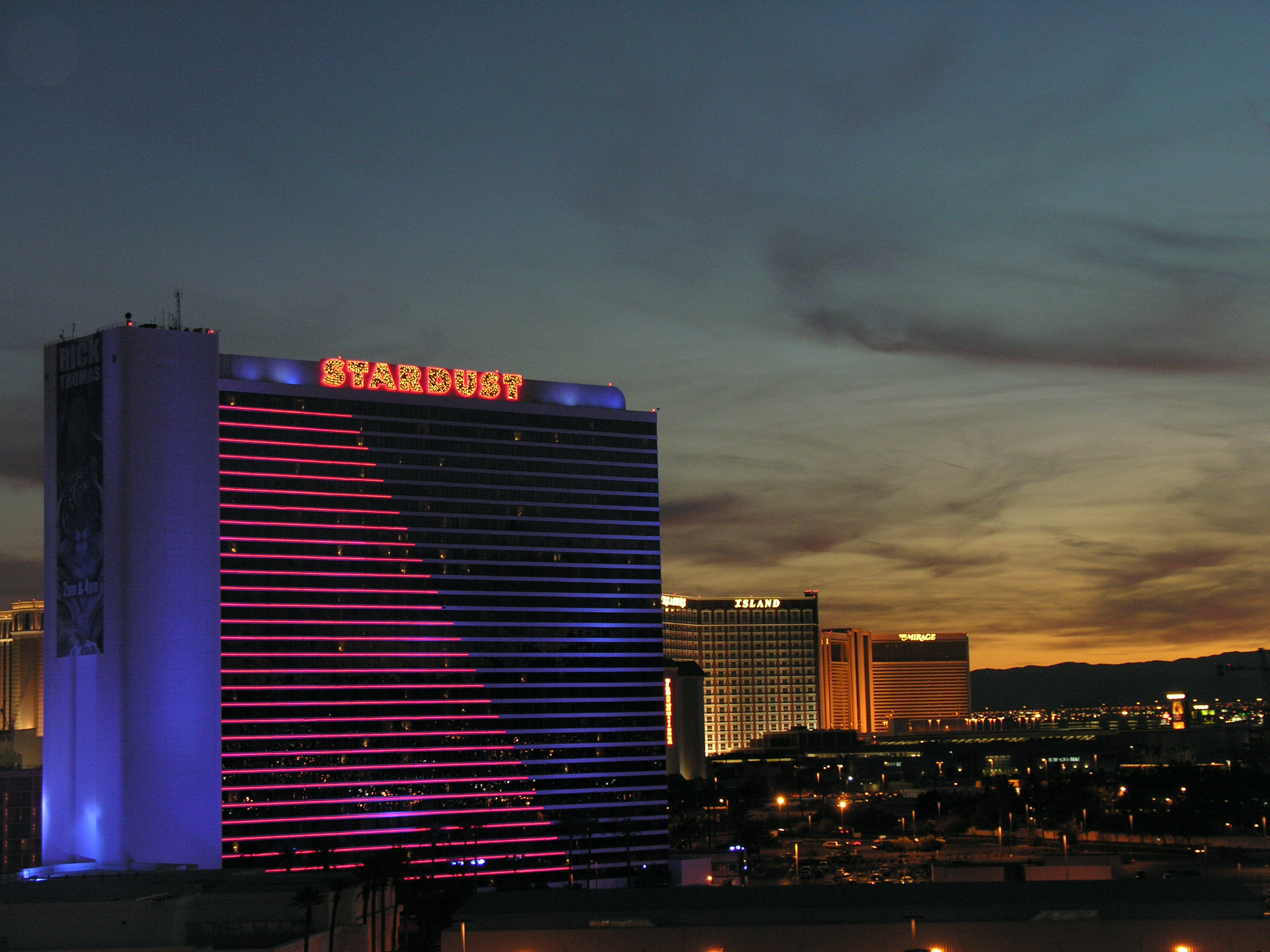
The Stardust tower at night

The Stardust was one of the few Strip properties without a high-rise hotel tower, and there were plans to eventually add one. In early 1990, construction was underway on the 32-story tower and a conference center. The RV park closed that year to make room for the expansion. The first 700 rooms of the tower were opened on December 21, 1990, along with the 35,000 sq ft (3,300 m^{2}) conference center. The tower faced southwest to northeast, and the exterior featured horizontal, red-colored neon lights, located in between each floor. During the 1990s, the Stardust had its own in-house direct marketing department, an uncommon feature for a hotel-casino.

By 1997, there were plans to remodel and expand the Stardust. A $9 million renovation of the Stardust suites took place in 1998, and plans were announced for a separate $24 million renovation project. The latter would include new signs, and minor remodeling of hotel rooms and the casino. The project was underway in 1999, with improvements being made to the façade.

By the end of 1999, demolition was set to begin soon on the remaining 537 hotel rooms left from the resort's opening in 1958. The rooms were contained across four motel buildings, each of them two stories in height. Boyd Gaming considered using the property for an expansion of the Stardust convention facilities. In 2001, despite fears of an economic slowdown, Boyd Gaming announced plans to expand its convention space. The new Stardust Pavilion and Exhibit Center would add 40,500 sq ft (3,760 m^{2}), and would be built next to the existing conference center, which had 25,000 sq ft (2,300 m^{2}).

At the time of its closure, the Stardust was among the smallest resorts on the Las Vegas Strip, with 1,552 rooms, and an 85,000 sq ft (7,900 m^{2}) casino. The Los Angeles Times wrote that the resort went from being "the world's largest hotel to one of the smallest on the Strip, from glamour to infamy to middle-class normalcy." The Stardust primarily catered to a middle class clientele for much of its history, and at the time of its closing, it was one of the few remaining Strip resorts to still offer affordable amenities; newer resorts were becoming increasingly upscale.

=== Signs ===
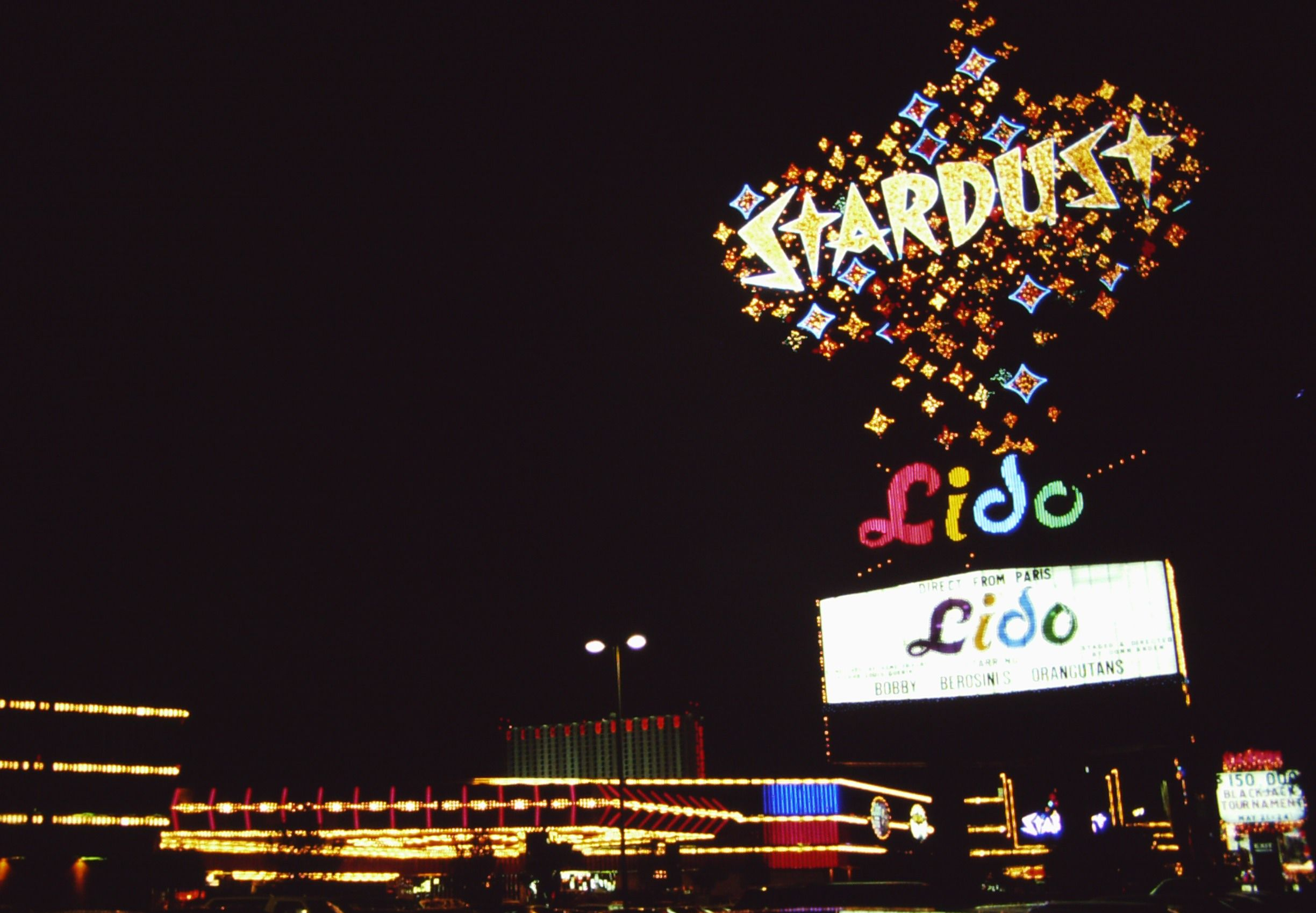

Roadside sign before and after Helvetica font

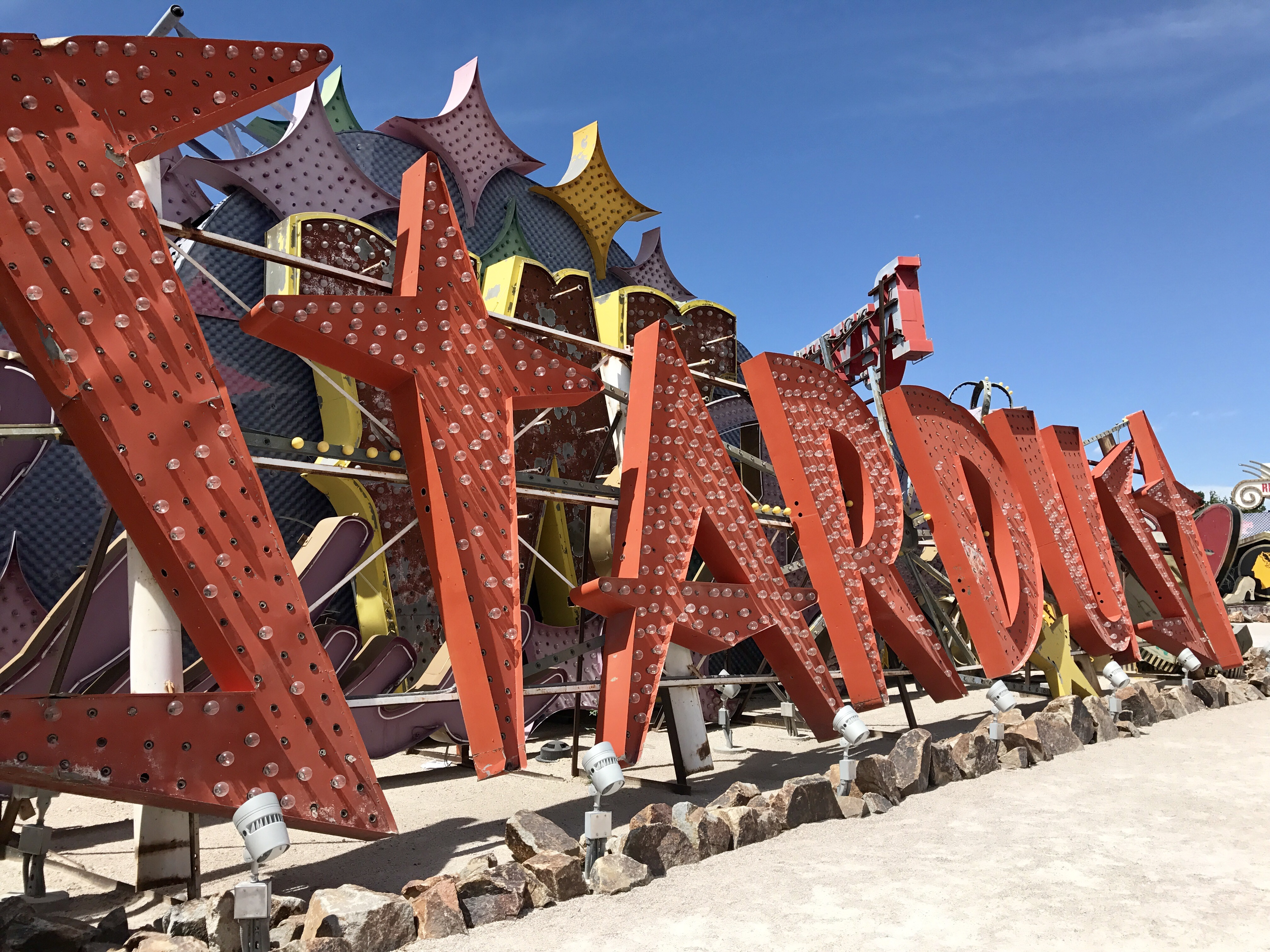
Original Stardust lettering at the Neon Museum, 2013

The 1958 Stardust façade sign was 216 feet (66 m) long and 37 feet (11 m) high, wrapping around two sides of the building, and was lit with 7,100 feet (2,200 m) of neon tubing and 11,000 incandescent bulbs. It weighed 129 short tons (117 t), contained 32,000 feet (9,800 m) of wiring, and drew 3,000 amps. At the bend in the sign was a 16-foot (4.9 m) diameter plastic model of the Earth. Cosmic rays of neon and electric light bulbs beamed from behind the model Earth in all directions. Three-dimensional acrylic glass planets spun alongside 20 sparkling neon starbursts. Across the universe was a jagged galaxy of electric lettering spelling out "Stardust". The "S" alone contained 975 lamps. At night, the neon constellation was reportedly visible from over 3 miles (4.8 km) away. The façade signage was designed by Kermit Wayne.

In 1968 the hotel's appearance underwent a major change. A roadside sign, designed by Paul Miller of the Ad Art Company, was installed in February 1968. It was 188 feet tall and 93 feet wide, and was among the most popular neon signs in Las Vegas. That April, the hotel's façade was rebuilt according to a design by Raymond Larson of YESCO.

In 1977, the façade was revamped to remove the space theme and signage, instead adding a series of blue and magenta mirror panels along the front of the resort. The Stardust's roadside sign was retained, although its lettering was eventually replaced with the Helvetica font in 1991. The original lettering was given to the city's Neon Museum, and was eventually refurbished in 2020. The Stardust roadside sign was dismantled in February 2007, and was also given to the Neon Museum. A 56-foot-wide sign, for the property's Lido de Paris show, was also acquired by the museum and added to its tour in 2023.

=== Restaurants ===
Aku Aku, a Polynesian restaurant, opened on the Stardust property in January 1960. However, a fire occurred in the restaurant's attic just days after the opening, and the nearby casino was briefly closed because of smoke. Natural gas was the cause of the fire. Aku Aku reopened several weeks later. The restaurant included a tiki bar and a large stone tiki head (moai) marking the entrance from the outside. Another new restaurant, the Plantation Kitchen, was opened in 1966. The Palm Room restaurant was renovated in 1969, and a new restaurant was added in 1975.

Aku Aku closed in 1980, and one of the moai heads was relocated to an island pond at Sunset Park, located in the Las Vegas Valley. Various restaurants were added during the renovations in the late 1980s, including a Tony Roma's, and William B's Steakhouse, named after Bill Boyd. A 340-seat buffet and a Japanese restaurant were added in the late 1990s, as part of the resort's latest renovations. As of 2002, the Stardust had five restaurants, including Tony Roma's.

== Shows and entertainers ==
When the Stardust opened in 1958, it included the Cafe Continental dinner showroom, which had seating for 700 people. It included a rising stage capable of sinking 30 feet (9.1 m) below and rising 10 feet (3.0 m) above the floor. The stage was billed as larger than a basketball court, held a swimming tank and ice skating rink, and was capable of generating rain and snow on demand. Topless showgirls performed on opening night in Lido de Paris, a show imported from France. The Las Vegas version ran at the Stardust for several decades. When it premiered, the production cost $250,000.

Valerie Perrine was a showgirl in Lido de Paris in the late 1960s. In addition to showgirls, Lido de Paris also featured comedy and live animals. Siegfried & Roy, along with their animals, were among performers in the show during the 1970s. Other notable performers at the Stardust included Tim Conway, Harvey Korman, Phyllis Diller, Robert Goulet, Don Rickles, Billy Daniels, Chicago, Steve and Eydie, The Temptations, the Four Tops, George Carlin, Bobby Berosini, Andrew Dice Clay, and Bob Newhart.

Aside from the main showroom, the Stardust also had entertainers perform in its lounge, which was expanded in 1969. The lounge, present since the resort's opening, was replaced with new casino space during renovations in 1975. The $1 million, 650-seat Starlight theater lounge was opened on October 1, 1976, replacing the one that had closed a year earlier. According to the Las Vegas Sun in 1977, Argent Corporation "took out the best lounge in town at the Stardust, replaced it with a mini-main showroom, treated it as a lounge, over priced it, then closed it." The Starlight Lounge reopened at the end of 1977.

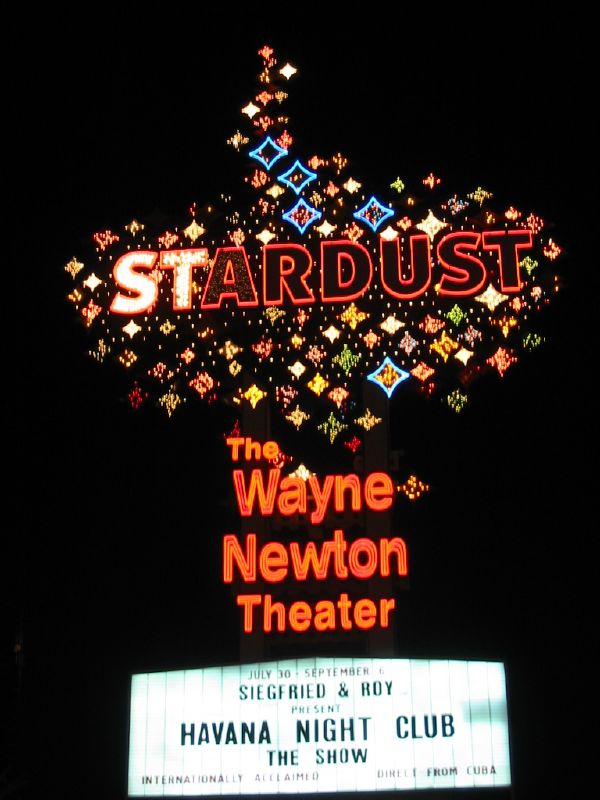
Stardust sign, advertising Wayne Newton and Havana Night Club

Lido de Paris continued to run until 1991, when it was replaced by a modernized show that also featured topless showgirls. The new show was part of an effort by Boyd Group to modernize the Stardust. Another reason for the original show's closure was the high cost of production. Lido de Paris ran for more than 32 years, putting on 22,000 performances. The new show, Enter the Night, opened in July 1991. The show was updated with new costumes and cast members in 1997, and figure skater Dorothy Hamill briefly performed in the show during 1998. Thunder from Down Under, a male revue, did several shows at the Stardust in the 1990s.

In October 1999, the Stardust hired Wayne Newton as its resident headliner for a reported $25 million per year. Newton would perform in the 920-seat Stardust Theater, which would be renamed the Wayne Newton Theater. Enter the Night ended in December 1999, and Newton began performing in the same theater space a month later. Newton helped to keep the Stardust competitive during its final years. Bob Anderson performed at the Stardust in 2000, and began a three-month residency two years later, in the Starlight Lounge. Gene Pitney made his Las Vegas Strip debut at the Stardust in 2003, and hypnotist Anthony Cools began a six-month run at the resort that year.

Havana Night Club premiered at the Stardust in 2004, featuring more than 50 Cuban dancers, musicians, and singers, It was directed by Kenny Ortega, and co-produced by Siegfried & Roy. The show previously premiered in 1999 and toured around the world, but the Las Vegas version was modified extensively by Ortega, who spent a year working on it. The show's Las Vegas debut was postponed because of issues concerning travel visas, and the Stardust briefly considered hiring a replacement act. Havana Night Club eventually opened in August 2004, after a three-week delay.

Magician Rick Thomas began performing at the Stardust in March 2005, and Newton ended his show a month later, saying that he wanted to move on. Newton's commitment to USO tours was a factor in his Stardust departure. Steve and Eydie were the final entertainers to perform at the Stardust, on October 28, 2006.

== Cultural references ==
=== In literature ===
- Casino: Love and Honor in Las Vegas, written by Nicholas Pileggi, chronicles the period when the Stardust and other casinos were run by Frank Rosenthal and Anthony Spilotro on behalf of the Chicago and Kansas City Mafia during the 1970s and early 1980s.
- The Odds: One Season, Three Gamblers and the Death of Their Las Vegas, by Chad Millman, chronicles a year in the lives of Stardust race and sportsbook manager Joe Lupo and assistant manager Bob Scucci, as well as professional sports bettor Alan Boston and wannabe sports bettor Rodney Bosnich. The Stardust was chosen due to its status at the time as the "home of the opening line".
- The Stardust of Yesterday: Reflections on a Las Vegas Legend, written by Heidi Knapp Rinella and edited by Mike Weatherford, is a complete history of the hotel and casino. Rinella and Weatherford were staff writers for the Las Vegas Review-Journal. Siegfried & Roy provided the book's foreword, sharing their many memories of the resort.
- Learning from Las Vegas included several studies of the 1968 roadside sign for the Stardust.
- Funny in Farsi Includes talk of staying at the Stardust Casino and Resort

=== Onscreen ===
In 1977, Rosenthal debuted a live talk show that was taped inside the Stardust. The resort was also a regular filming location for the 1980s television series Crime Story. The Stardust sign makes brief appearances in the music video for "House of Mystic Lights", a 1988 song by C. C. Catch. Several films were shot at the Stardust in the 1990s, including Saved by the Bell: Wedding in Las Vegas, Showgirls, and Swingers.

Casino, the 1995 film adaptation of Pileggi's book, features two characters who are largely based on Rosenthal and Spilotro. The casino's name was changed for legal purposes, from the Stardust to the "Tangiers Hotel and Casino". However, snippets of the Hoagy Carmichael song "Stardust" can be heard on the soundtrack, giving a subtle hint as to the casino's true identity.

In the film Mars Attacks (1996), the Stardust’s neon sign can be seen in the background.

The Stardust was a filming location for the 1998 film Fear and Loathing in Las Vegas, in which it is portrayed as the fictional Bazooko Circus casino. Subsequent films shot at the Stardust include The Debtors and Pasty Faces. The resort was also featured in commercials for Miller Lite and Aflac, during the early 2000s. A television pilot for a failed reality show, titled So You Wanna Be an Actor, was shot at the Stardust in September 2006, becoming the last production project to shoot there.

Preceded by Boardwalk	Hotels demolished in Las Vegas using explosives 2007	Succeeded by New Frontier
