= Bob Anderson =

Bob Anderson may refer to:

== Sports ==
- Bob Anderson (fencer) (1922–2012), swordmaster and stunt double for Darth Vader in the Star Wars films
- Bob Anderson (footballer) (1924–1994), Scottish footballer
- Bob Anderson (racing driver) (1931–1967), British Formula One driver and motorcycle racer
- Bob Anderson (baseball) (1935–2015), Major League Baseball pitcher, 1957–1963
- Bob Anderson (American football) (born 1938), member of the College Football Hall of Fame
- Bob Anderson (wrestler) (born 1944), American wrestler
- Bob Anderson (runner) (born 1947), founder of magazine Runner's World
- Bob Anderson (darts player) (born 1947), world professional darts champion (1988) from England

== Other ==
- Bob Anderson (director) (born 1965), animation director for The Simpsons
- Bob Anderson (engineer), one of the pioneers of the artificial cardiac pacemaker
- Bob Anderson (Days of Our Lives), a character from Days of Our Lives
- Bob Anderson (Canadian politician) (born 1939), Canadian politician
- Bob Anderson (Mississippi politician) (1930–1998), American politician from Mississippi
- Bob Anderson (entertainer), American singer and entertainer

== See also ==
- Robert Anderson (disambiguation)
- Bobby Anderson (disambiguation)
- Bob Andersen, member of the Nebraska Legislature
