= John William Bolts =

American politician (1861–1921)

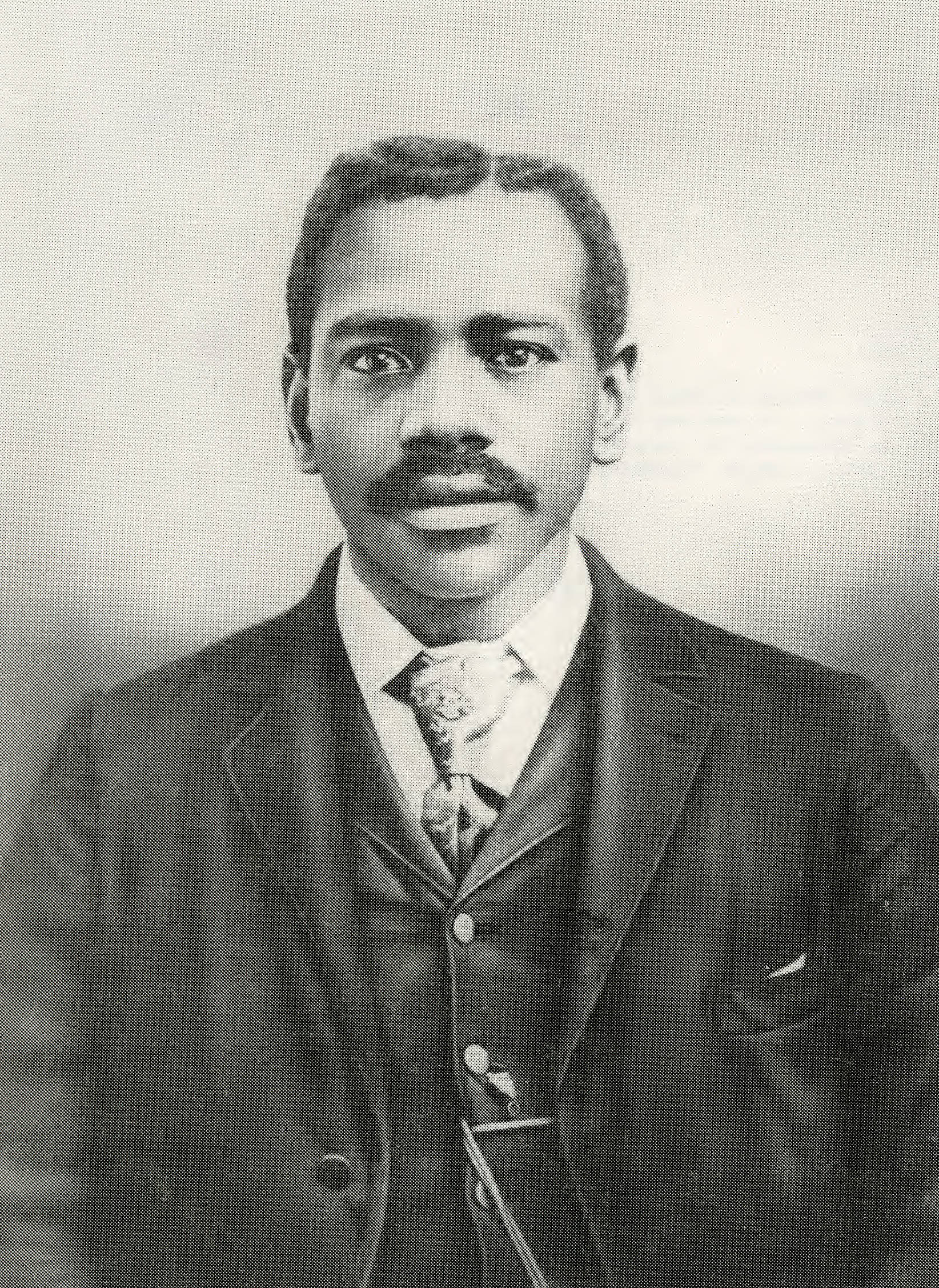

Member of the South Carolina House of Representatives
- In office 1898–1901
- Preceded by: Robert B. Anderson

Personal details
- Born: May 12, 1861 Georgetown, South Carolina, U.S.
- Died: 1921
- Party: Republican
- Spouse: Gertrude Ford Bolts
- Children: 4
- Education: Benedict College

John William Bolts (May 12, 1861 – 1921) was a state legislator in South Carolina. He was elected in 1898 and 1900 from Georgetown, South Carolina and served in the South Carolina House of Representatives. Bolts was the last African American to serve in the South Carolina House of Representatives for seven decades that followed, and the last Republican until Charles Boineau was elected in a special election in 1961.

John William Bolts was born on May 12, 1861, in Georgetown, South Carolina. He attended Benedict College in Columbia, South Carolina.

Bolts succeeded Robert B. Anderson as the African American representative for the Georgetown County fusion ticket.

He was married to Gertrude Ford Bolts and had four children.
