= Bob Scucci =

Robert "Bob" Scucci is the Vice President of Race and Sports for Boyd Gaming Corp. and was formerly the Assistant Race and Sports Book Manager at the Stardust Resort and Casino. He was in charge of Stardust sports book in its last years of operations, and is now fully in charge of Boyd gaming nationwide in sports and horse racing.
