= Heidi Knapp Rinella =

American restaurant critic

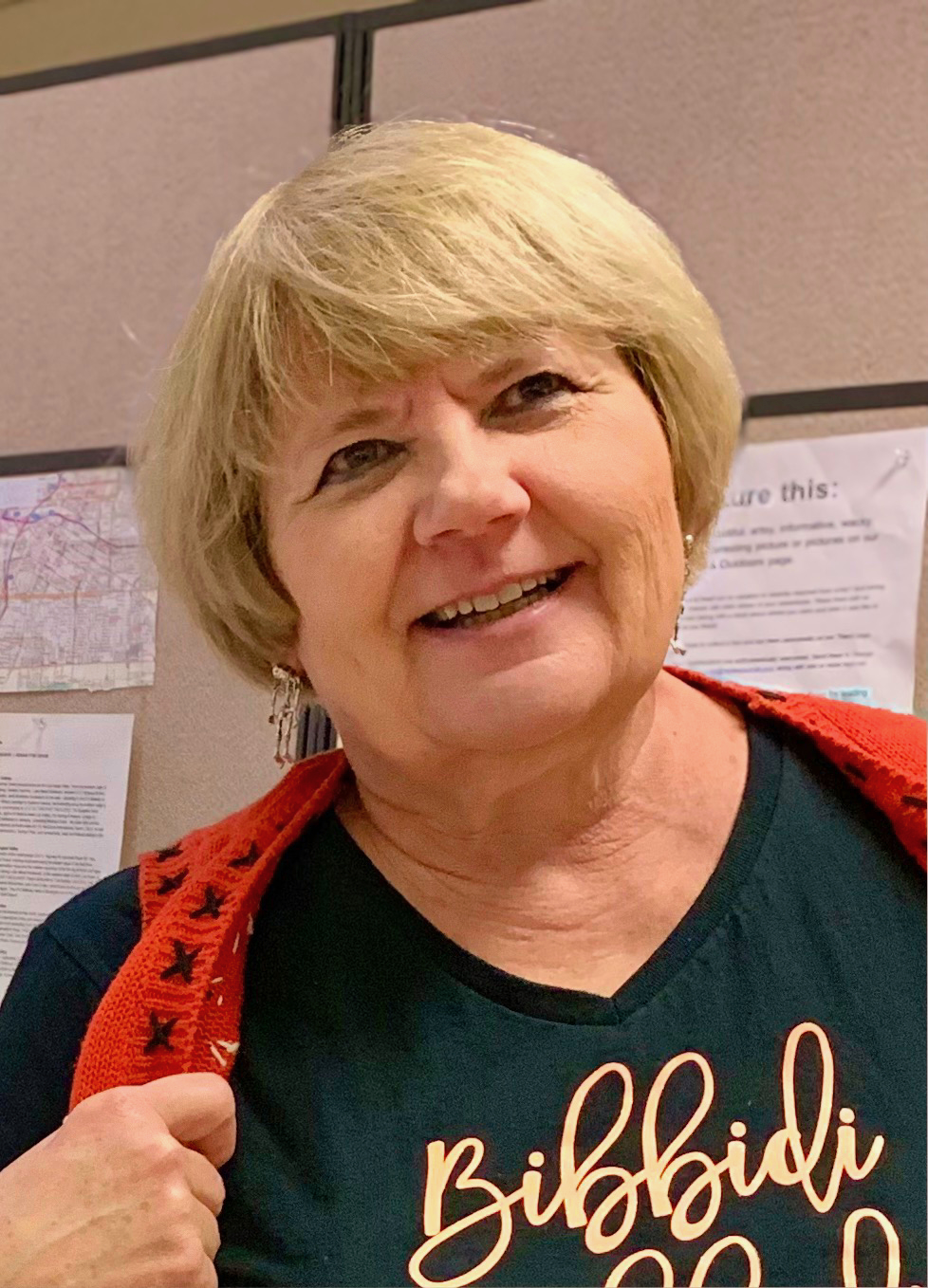
- Heidi Knapp Rinella, former restaurant critic for the Las Vegas Review-Journal
- Born: 1956 (age 68–69)
- Occupation: Restaurant critic

Heidi Knapp Rinella is the former restaurant critic for the Las Vegas Review-Journal newspaper. She reviewed restaurants on Friday in Neon and her column, "Taste of the Town," appeared on Wednesdays in Living/Taste. She dined anonymously and paid for her own meals to ensure unbiased reviews.

Rinella has been a journalist for more than 25 years and is the recipient of a number of journalism awards, including three first-place awards for critical writing from the Nevada Press Association. She has worked for newspapers in Ohio, Florida, and Nevada and has published a number of Las Vegas and Nevada travel books.

The book The Stardust of Yesterday: Reflections on a Las Vegas Legend written by Rinella, edited by Mike Weatherford and foreword by Siegfried and Roy, is a complete history of the Stardust Resort and Casino. Rinella and Weatherford were both staff writers for the Las Vegas Review-Journal newspaper. In the book, Siegfried & Roy, who debuted at the Stardust in the 1970s, tell of their many memories.

Knapp retired from food writing in January 2022.

== Personal ==
Heidi Knapp Rinella is not related to Las Vegas reporter George Knapp. She is, however, highly amused whenever she is asked if George Knapp is her father—which happens often.
