= Robert Andersson =

Robert Andersson may refer to:

- Robert Andersson (water polo) (1886–1972), Swedish water polo player, diver, and freestyle swimmer
- Robert Andersson (handballer) (born 1969), Swedish Olympic handball player
- Robert Andersson (footballer) (born 1971), Swedish footballer

== See also ==
- Robert Anderson (disambiguation)
- Robban Andersson (born 1974), Swedish TV personality
