= Robert Wherry Anderson =

British journalist and political activist

Robert Wherry Anderson (1864 – 12 October 1937) was a British journalist and political activist.

Anderson was a political journalist and, for more than a decade, wrote the "Gracchus" column in Reynolds Newspaper. He left the paper in 1914, when Lord Dalziel bought a controlling interest, and worked as a motoring journalist for a few years, after which he began writing on behalf of David Lloyd George.

He joined the Fabian Society in 1888, and served on its executive committee for several years. Following World War I, he remained a prominent supporter of Lloyd George and the Liberal Party. He died suddenly in 1937.
