= Robert Banneka Anderson Sr. =

American State Legislator in the 19c

Robert Banneka Anderson Sr. was an American teacher, state legislator, and postmaster in Georgetown, South Carolina. He served in the legislature from 1890 to 1896. He represented Georgetown County.

He served at the South Carolina Constitutional Convention of 1895.

His son Robert Banneka Anderson Jr. graduated from Hampton Institute and was a mail carrier in Georgetown.
