= Robert B. Anderson (South Carolina politician) =

American politician

Robert B. Anderson was an American teacher, warden, state legislator, and postmaster in Georgetown County, South Carolina. He served several terms in the South Carolina House of Representatives as part of a fusion ticket and was succeeded by John Bolts.

== See also ==
- African American officeholders from the end of the Civil War until before 1900
