= Bobby Anderson (footballer) =

Scottish footballer

Personal information
- Full name: Robert Nicol Smith Anderson
- Date of birth: 26 February 1897
- Place of birth: Ardrossan, Ayrshire, Scotland
- Date of death: 1974 (aged 76–77)
- Position: Right back

Senior career*
Years	Team	Apps	(Gls)
- Ardrossan Winton Rovers
1923–1926	Luton Town	74	(0)
1926–1930	Newport County	137	(0)
1930–1931	Lincoln City	27	(0)
- * Club domestic league appearances and goals

Robert Nicol Smith Anderson (26 February 1897 – 1974) was a Scottish footballer who made 238 appearances in the Football League playing for Luton Town, Newport County and Lincoln City. He played as a right back.
