= Bob Anderson (entertainer) =

American singer and impersonator

Bob Anderson is an American singer and impersonator of legendary celebrities.

== History ==
Anderson’s career was started in 1973, when he was in Las Vegas and got a chance to watch a Nancy Sinatra rehearsal. Nancy got into an argument with The Everly Brothers and went off stage. Later she contacted performers but on the suggestion of entertainment journalist Mark Tan, Anderson got an opportunity to perform with Nancy on stage after his successful audition.

Anderson’s first appearance on national television was with Nancy Sinatra to The Merv Griffin Show and he got a standing ovation. Merv Griffin later wrote an act for him and introduced Anderson to the world in Caesars Palace.

Anderson has mastered the likes of Frank Sinatra, Dean Martin, Sammy Davis Jr, and his Frank The Man The Music was backed by a 32-piece orchestra in which he looks, sounds, and moves like the late musical icon for 90 minutes. which according to BroadwayWorld was voted "Best Live Show", "Best Headliner", and "Best Live Performance" at the annual Las Vegas Best of the Best Entertainment Awards in 2015. Anderson spent hours watching videos of Frank and mimicking them and turned to Hollywood makeup artist Kazuhiro Tsuji.

Anderson focuses on legendary Vegas entertainers, including the Rat Pack, Tony Bennett, Ray Charles and Bobby Darin. Anderson possess the voice range and characteristics to recreate past and present greats.

People magazine has called Anderson as “America’s Greatest Singing Impressionist.”
